= Charles Noad =

Charles Noad at a Tolkien Society meeting at Keble College, Oxford in 1992

Charles E. Noad was a programmer, Tolkien scholar, and a long-standing member of the Tolkien Society, which he helped to found.

== Life ==
Charles Noad was born in 1947. He worked at Imperial College, London as a computer programmer.

A Tolkien fan, he was involved in the work of the Tolkien Society, which he helped to found, for over 50 years, making him its longest-standing member; he served as its bibliographer and photographer, and belonged to its London local group, the Northfarthing Smial. The society described his essay "On the Construction of The Silmarillion" as "critically important"; it was published in the 2000 scholarly collection Tolkien's Legendarium: Essays on The History of Middle-earth, edited by Verlyn Flieger and Carl F. Hostetter. His friendship with Christopher Tolkien led to his proofreading several Middle-earth books including The History of Middle-earth.

Several Tolkien scholars knew, corresponded with, and exchanged books with Noad for 40 years or more. Douglas A. Anderson wrote that Noad's "eagle-eye as a proof-reader was legendary." David Bratman described Noad's "On the Construction of The Silmarillion" as a "fascinating and well-researched and -argued" essay on what J. R. R. Tolkien would probably have done to that book, making it "more heterogeneous" than the volume edited by Christopher Tolkien and published a few months after Noad's essay. John D. Rateliff called Noad "the first fellow Tolkien scholar I met". Rateliff described Noad's influence on Tolkien research as "powerful but subtle", in particular on the 12-volume set of The History of Middle-earth. He described Noad's proofreading of Rateliff's The History of the Hobbit as "meticulous".

== Works ==
- 1977 The Trees, the Jewels and the Rings: A Discursive Enquiry Into Things Little Known on Middle-earth (44 pages). The Tolkien Society. ISBN 978-090552001-8.
- 2000 "On the Construction of The Silmarillion", in Tolkien's Legendarium: Essays on The History of Middle-earth. Greenwood Press. ISBN 978-0-313-30530-6
