= The Fall of Númenor =

Literary work by J. R. R. Tolkien

- The cover depicts Númenor being drowned in the remaking of Arda.
- Editor: Brian Sibley
- Author: J. R. R. Tolkien
- Illustrator: Alan Lee
- Cover artist: Alan Lee
- Language: English
- Subject: Tolkien's legendarium
- Genre: High fantasy
- Published: 15 November 2022
- Publisher: HarperCollins
- Publication place: United Kingdom
- Media type: Print (hardback)
- Pages: 332
- ISBN: 978-0-00-853783-8
- OCLC: 1341269947
- Preceded by: The Nature of Middle-earth

The Fall of Númenor: And Other Tales from the Second Age of Middle-Earth is an edited 2022 collection of J. R. R. Tolkien's Second Age writings. The editor, Brian Sibley, uses extracts from "The Tale of Years" in the Appendices of The Lord of the Rings as a framework for the writings. The materials in the book cover the foundation, history and destruction of the land of Númenor; the forging of the Rings of Power; and the Last Alliance against Sauron that ended the Second Age.

Reviewers have commented that the book, timed to coincide with Amazon's television series The Lord of the Rings: The Rings of Power, set in the Second Age, will prove useful to its fans, giving them a grounding in Tolkien's writings. They note however that it offers little to scholars, as unlike The Nature of Middle-earth it contains no previously unpublished materials. Further, its purely chronological approach neither establishes a coherent narrative, nor traces the history of Tolkien's many drafts.

== Synopsis ==
The Fall of Númenor collects already-published materials about the Second Age of Middle-earth into a chronological format, its structure exactly mirroring the timeline supplied by J. R. R. Tolkien in "A Tale of Years" in Appendix B of The Lord of the Rings. Brian Sibley gathered the materials from the 1977 The Silmarillion, the 1980 Unfinished Tales, the 12-volume 1983–1996 The History of Middle-earth, and the 2021 The Nature of Middle-earth.

Sibley's introduction to the chronology is titled "The Saga of 'A Dark Age'".

The body of the book, titled "The Tale of Years (Chronology of the Westland)s", covers the foundation, history and destruction of the land of Númenor; the forging of the Rings of Power; and the Last Alliance against Sauron that ended the Second Age.

The chapters concerning Númenor from the 1987 The Lost Road and Other Writings are included as an appendix.

== Publication ==
The Fall of Númenor was published on 15 November 2022, its launch timed to coincide with the release of the television series The Lord of the Rings: The Rings of Power, set in the Second Age.

Sibley provides new introductions and commentaries. The book's cover, ten colour paintings and several line drawings are by the Tolkien artist, the illustrator Alan Lee.

== Reception ==
Dan'l Danehy-Oakes, reviewing the book for Tolkien Studies, writes that while The Fall of Númenor provides nothing that was not already in print, its largely chronological rearrangement of the materials has value. In his view, the handsomely produced volume successfully "walks a fine and perilous line" between being a "readerly" or a scholarly book. Given that it was released at the same time as Amazon's Rings of Power, Danehy-Oakes remarks, it offers fans a view of the feigned history of the Second Age, without what he calls the "distort[ions] and misrepresent[ations] of the television series. Brenton Dickieson comments that the book is skilfully illustrated, but that without any new material, which, he writes, seems to have been exhausted with The Nature of Middle-earth (as its editor, Carl Hostetter, implies, barring linguistic or philological texts), the book "serves primarily to root viewers of Amazon's The Rings of Power in the richer soils of Middle-earth."

Douglas Kane, in Journal of Tolkien Research, writes that scholars expected that Sibley would either write a continuous narrative, as in Christopher Tolkien's 2007 The Children of Húrin, or would trace the history of J. R. R. Tolkien's many drafts and fragments on the subject, as in Christopher Tolkien's 2018 The Fall of Gondolin. Instead, Sibley made the "unfortunate" choice of "treat[ing] the Second Age as mere fodder for backstory to The Lord of the Rings". In Kane's view, this fails to recognise the value of the material; fails to establish "a coherent narrative"; and fails to trace the history of Tolkien's drafts properly. Kane notes that Sibley uses Tolkien's "The Tale of Years" as his framework, supplying the titles of his chapters, and then "attempt[ing] to pigeon-hole excerpts" from all the sources he employed under those headings. The result of this cut-and-paste approach "often results in an incoherent mess." He quotes Eldy Dunami's view of the book's use of the tale of Aldarion and Erendis, which she calls "the most egregious example" of cutting up a story and interleaving the excerpts with fragments from other places. In her view, the result is "akin to an 'explainer' blog post'".

Hamish Williams, reviewing the book in Journal of Inklings Studies, writes that for readers unfamiliar with Tolkien's writings, the book "ably fills" the gap in published works, with nothing before it providing a "clear, cohesive, comprehensive summation of the Second Age" as the book does. However, he questions whether the rearrangement of the stories is "a constructive (i.e. not damaging) enterprise", or whether Tolkien's "narrative design" would not be ruined, its "aesthetic appeal" lost. He describes the book as "an edited version of edited versions [his emphasis] of Tolkien's work": in editorial terms, in his view, something of a nested set of Russian dolls.

== See also ==
- Middle-earth canon

== Sources ==
- Tolkien, J. R. R. (1955). The Return of the King. The Lord of the Rings. Boston: Houghton Mifflin. OCLC 519647821.
