= Tolkien's Legendarium: Essays on The History of Middle-earth =

2000 essay collection edited by Verlyn Flieger and Carl F. Hostetter

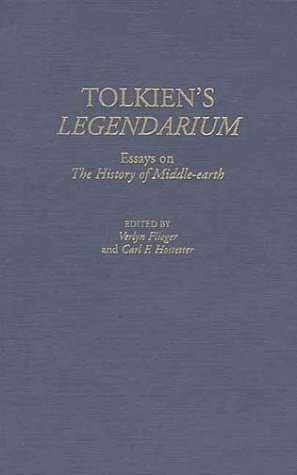
- Book cover
- Author: Verlyn Flieger and Carl F. Hostetter, editors
- Language: English
- Subject: History of Middle-earth
- Genre: Tolkien studies
- Publisher: Greenwood Press
- Publication date: 2000
- Publication place: United States
- Media type: Hardcover
- ISBN: 978-0-313-30530-6
- OCLC: 41315400
- Dewey Decimal: 823/.912 21
- LC Class: PR6039.O32 H5727 2000

Tolkien's Legendarium: Essays on The History of Middle-earth is a collection of scholarly essays edited by Verlyn Flieger and Carl F. Hostetter on the 12 volumes of The History of Middle-earth, relating to J. R. R. Tolkien's fiction and compiled and edited by his son, Christopher. It was published by Greenwood Press in 2000. That series comprises a substantial part of "Tolkien's legendarium", the body of Tolkien's mythopoeic writing that forms the background to his The Lord of the Rings and which Christopher Tolkien summarized in his construction of The Silmarillion.

It includes a bibliography of works by Christopher Tolkien compiled by Douglas A. Anderson.

Tolkien's Legendarium won the 2002 Mythopoeic Scholarship Award for Inklings Studies.

== Contents ==
The history

- Rayner Unwin — Early Days of Elder Days
- Christina Scull — The Development of Tolkien's Legendarium: Some Threads in the Tapestry of Middle-earth
- Wayne G. Hammond — 'A Continuing and Evolving Creation': Distractions in the Later History of Middle-earth
- Charles Noad — On the Construction of The Silmarillion
- David Bratman — The Literary Value of The History of Middle-earth

The languages

- Christopher Gilson — Gnomish is Sindarin: The Conceptual Evolution of an Elvish Language
- Arden R. Smith — Certhas, Skirditaila, Futhark: A Feigned History of Runic Origins
- Patrick Wynne and Carl F. Hostetter — Three Elvish Verse Modes: Ann-thennath, Minlamad thent / estent, and Linnod

The cauldron and the cook

- Joe R. Christopher — Tolkien's Lyric Poetry
- Paul Edmund Thomas — Some of Tolkien's Narrators
- Verlyn Flieger — The Footsteps of Ælfwine
- John D. Rateliff — The Lost Road, The Dark Tower, and The Notion Club Papers: Tolkien and Lewis's Time Travel Triad
- Marjorie Burns — Gandalf and Odin
- Richard C. West — Túrin's Ofermod: An Old English Theme in the Development of the Story of Túrin

Appendix

- Douglas A. Anderson — Christopher Tolkien: A Bibliography

== Reception ==
John S. Ryan, reviewing the book for VII, called it a "luminous companion" to the 12 volumes of The History of Middle-earth, and "clearly indispensable". Ryan stated that it "pays a much merited tribute" to Christopher Tolkien's six decades or more of work on his father's writings, indeed from his childhood as one of the original audience for The Hobbit. Ryan describes the 14 essays as "carefully argued", noting among other things Bratman's description of the 4 styles Tolkien used in the Legendarium as "Annalistic, Antique, Appendical, and Philosophical". The Catholic scholar Stratford Caldecott reviewed the book for The Chesterton Review.

Michael D. C. Drout and Hilary Wynne praise the book in their survey of Tolkien criticism since 1982 in Envoi, calling it "more specialized" and "of even higher scholarly quality" than George Clark and Daniel Timmons' essay collection J.R.R. Tolkien and His Literary Resonances. They call Charles Noad's essay "painstaking", writing that it "will not be easily surpassed"; and describe Verlyn Flieger's essay as "essential for understanding the links between English history, legend, and Tolkien's work". They single out, too, Paul Edmund Thomas's "admirable job" of analysing the style of Tolkien's narrators. And they call Patrick Wynne and Carl F. Hostetter's essay the "clearest and most approachable" study of elvish verse modes they had ever seen.

The Tolkien Society called Noad's essay "a critically important document" on the interpretation of The Silmarillion.
