= Anthony Appleyard =

Tolkien scholar (c. 1943 – 2022)

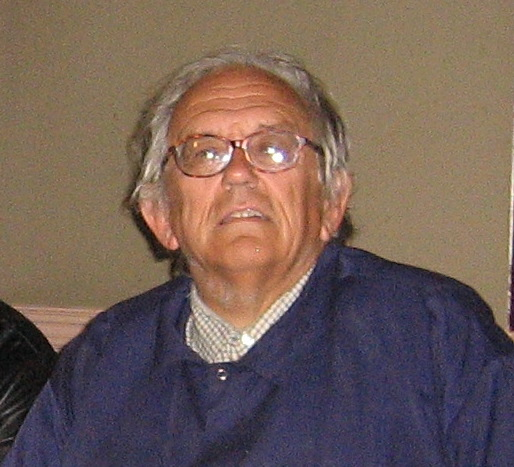
- At Meetup Manchester 6, 2009
- Born: c. 1943
- Died: 28 February 2022 (aged 78–79); Manchester, England
- Known for: Quenya grammar

Anthony Appleyard (c. 1943 – 28 February 2022) worked at the University of Manchester Institute of Science and Technology, and was known as a Tolkien scholar specialising in Tolkien's constructed languages. His 1995 description of the Elvish language Quenya was the first to use the information published in The History of Middle-earth. This was criticised by the Tolkien scholar Carl F. Hostetter as trying to construct a single consistent language rather than accepting that Quenya changed over time, both in the real world as Tolkien continued to invent linguistic structures, and in the fictional history of Middle-earth as the Elvish languages changed and fragmented.

== Biography ==
Appleyard worked at the University of Manchester Institute of Science and Technology. He was a Wikipedia editor from 2004 until his death. He was an administrator of the global encyclopedia, and a member of its underwater diving project. He died in Manchester on 28 February 2022.

== Tolkien scholarship ==
=== Quenya grammar ===
The linguist, novelist, and Tolkien scholar Helge Fauskanger wrote that despite the attention given to Tolkien's languages, the information on the web before Fauskanger constructed his own Ardalambion website was mainly poor, with the exception of "Anthony Appleyard's work - very concentrated and technical, excellent for those who are already deep into these things, but probably difficult to absorb for beginners."

The Tolkien scholar Carl F. Hostetter wrote that it was Appleyard, in February 1992, who made "the first comprehensive attempt ... to systematize Quenya grammar in light of the new information published in The History of Middle-earth, particularly The Etymologies, in his article 'Quenya Grammar Reexamined'." Hostetter stated that the analysis collected together what was known of Quenya's grammar, and organised its grammatical structures "as Appleyard delineated them, in the form of paradigms assembled both from forms taken from sometimes widely separated conceptual stages of Quenya and from his own hypothetical constructions, together with not a few attempts to explain attested forms not fitting into these paradigms as errors on Tolkien's part." Hostetter commented that Appleyard's work was by 2007 useful mainly for summarising the attitudes to Tolkien's languages at that time. He characterised it as:

1. seeking to label and describe a unique function for each "grammatical inflection", such as the so-called "respective case"
2. seeking to "fill in gaps" that a linguist of English or Latin might expect
3. seeking to avoid "(supposed) 'clashes' and 'ambiguities'"
4. being willing "to reject or even ascribe to authorial error" grammatical forms that did not seem to fit in
5. seeking to complete or extend the languages by creating new forms
6. being willing to declare Tolkien's early words or forms "obsolete" if later forms seemed to have the same meanings
7. being willing to conflate forms from different Tolkien stages when these seemed to be "useful"

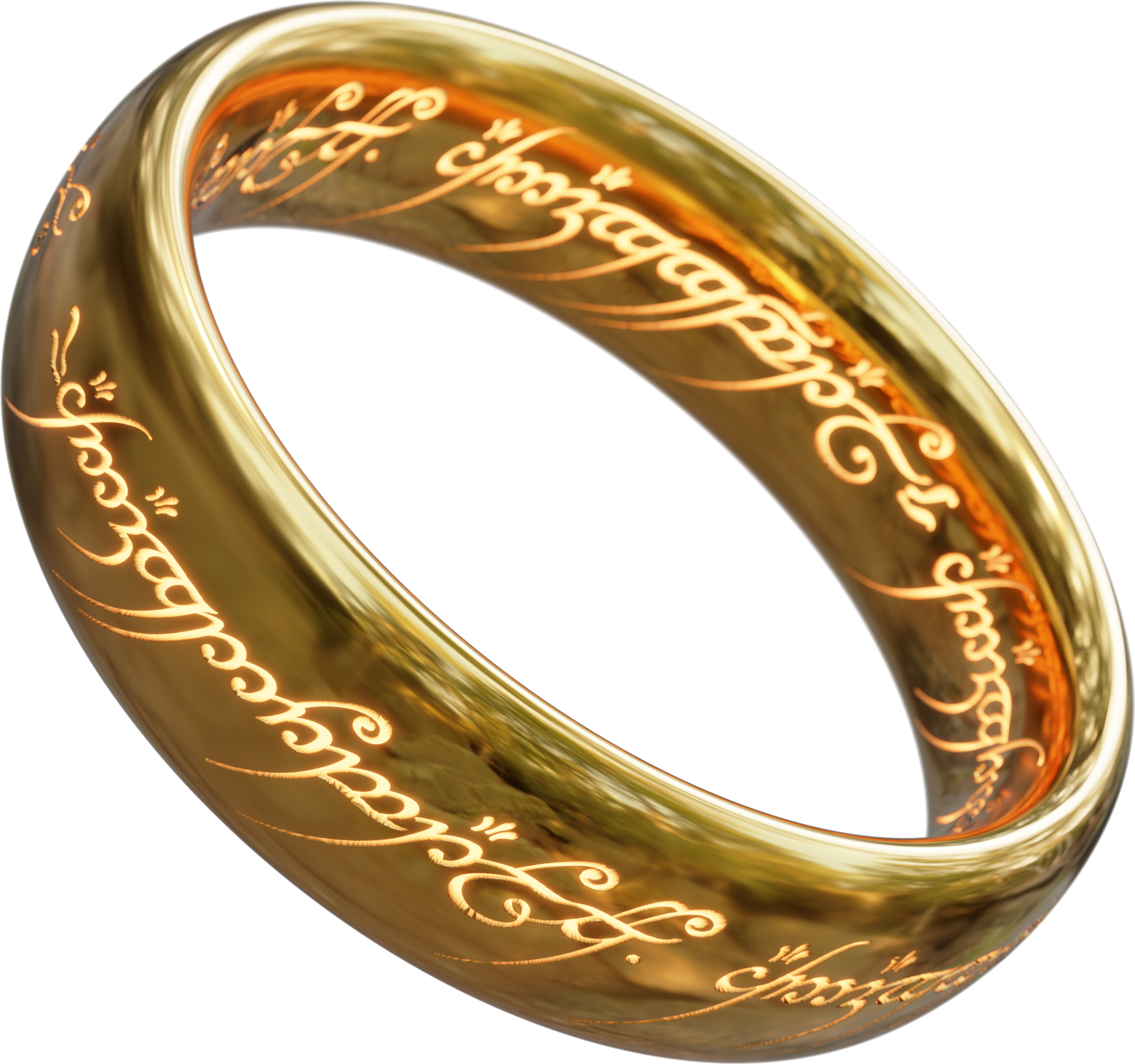
The inscription on the One Ring included the word nazg, "ring", four times. Appleyard suggested this word was derived from a phrase in Valarin, the language of the godlike Valar.

Appleyard named Quenya's respective case, a grammatical case for nouns in Tolkien's constructed Elvish language of Quenya; the linguist Paul Strack describes the grammatical forms and Appleyard's proposal, stating that "There is no direct evidence supporting this theory of its use, however."

=== Other languages ===
Appleyard wrote about Tolkien's frame story character Aelfwine of England, with analysis of Tolkien's use of Old English. Appleyard is recorded as observing that the word nazg ("ring") in the explicitly constructed language Black Speech – in the fiction, constructed by the Dark Lord Sauron, in reality by Tolkien – appeared to have been borrowed from the phrase chanana kad, meaning "ring of doom" in Tolkien's constructed language of Valarin. In 1995 he published the 19-page "Dictionaries of Middle-earth", covering the minor languages of "Danian, Old Beorian, Telerin, Ilkorin, Khuzdul, Old Noldorin, and Valarin."

=== Technology in Middle-earth ===
Appleyard wrote, too, on the subject of "Tolkien and Space Travel", noting that Tolkien and his friend C. S. Lewis had agreed to write a pair of science fiction stories, Lewis getting space travel and Tolkien getting time travel; Appleyard suggested that Tolkien drops several hints that advanced technologies (explosives used by the Orcs at Helm's Deep, iron dragons used to assault Gondolin) were developed on Arda. He wrote that Tolkien describes Eärendil's ship that sails across the sky built "'of mithril and of elven-glass / with shining prow: no shaven oar / nor sail she bore on silver mast', and mentions no wood in its construction. This indeed sounds suspiciously like most people's image of a spaceship."

== Sources ==
- Tolkien, J. R. R. (1954a). The Fellowship of the Ring. The Lord of the Rings. Boston: Houghton Mifflin. OCLC 9552942.
