= The Annotated Hobbit =

Douglas A. Anderson's annotated version from the novel by J. R. R. Tolkien

The Annotated Hobbit: The Hobbit, or There and Back Again
- Front dust jacket of the first edition
- Author: J. R. R. Tolkien, Douglas A. Anderson
- Genre: Novel with Literary analysis
- Publisher: Houghton Mifflin Harcourt, Unwin Hyman, HarperCollins
- Publication date: 1988
- Media type: Print
- Awards: Mythopoeic Scholarship Award
- ISBN: 978-0-395-47690-1
- LC Class: PR6039.O32 H6

The Annotated Hobbit: The Hobbit, or There and Back Again is an edition of J. R. R. Tolkien's novel The Hobbit with a commentary by Douglas A. Anderson. It was first published in 1988 by Houghton Mifflin Harcourt, Boston, in celebration of the 50th anniversary of the first American publication of The Hobbit, and by Unwin Hyman of London.

== Structure ==
The structure of The Annotated Hobbit is that of The Hobbit with its 19 chapters. The text is accompanied throughout with marginal notes beside the text and commenting on it by the Tolkien scholar Douglas A. Anderson. The edition includes more than 150 black-and-white illustrations from foreign editions and some that were drawn by Tolkien himself, and some rare poems written by Tolkien.

Navigable diagram of Tolkien's legendarium. The Annotated Hobbit stands alongside John D. Rateliff's The History of the Hobbit and Christopher Tolkien's 12-volume The History of Middle-earth.

== Reception ==
On its publication, The Annotated Hobbit was warmly welcomed in Mythlore by Glen GoodKnight, founder of the Mythopoeic Society. He began with the words "What a treasure trove; what a superb delight!" He was pleased by the annotations, from the briefest of definitions through to quotations from letters and entire poems. He specially liked the many illustrations and photographs, commenting that for some readers, the images of dust jackets and translations will be especially interesting. GoodKnight personally found "most of the foreign illustrations ... technically and artistically embarrassing", but even so the "cumulative effect" of the coverage of editions and translations was "rich and fascinating".

More recently, George W. Beahm has called The Annotated Hobbit "the most informative edition" of The Hobbit. The Tolkien scholar Tom Shippey noted that the earliest version of Tolkien's poem "The Hoard" from 1923 was best accessible in this book. The Annotated Hobbit won the 1990 Mythopoeic Scholarship Award in "Inkling studies" by the Mythopoeic Society.

== Editions ==
In 2002, after the initial publication of The Annotated Hobbit, a "Revised and Expanded Edition" was published. This version included maps and colour paintings. It also provided newer sources and greater understanding of Tolkien's legendarium. The appendix includes a chapter "The Quest of Erebor" about Gandalf's motivation to join Bilbo to the dwarven company. Another British edition was published in 2003 by HarperCollins of London.

== Translations ==
Translations into other languages include the following:

- French: Le Hobbit annoté. Translated by Lauzon, Daniel. Christian Bourgois. 2012. ISBN 978-2-267-02389-3.
- German: Das große Hobbit-Buch [The Big Hobbit Book]. Klett-Cotta. 2012. ISBN 978-3-608-93714-5.
- Italian:
  - Lo Hobbit annotato. Translated by Jeronimidis Conte, Elena; Griffini, Grazia Maria. Milano: Rusconi. 1991. ISBN 88-18-12100-6.
  - Lo Hobbit annotato. Bompiani. 2004. ISBN 978-8-845-23292-3. Reissued 2017.
- Japanese: 新版 ホビット 下: ゆきてかえりし物語 第四版・注釈版. Hara Shobo. 2012. ISBN 978-4-562-07001-5.
- Spanish: El Hobbit Anotado. Ediciones Minotauro. 1993. ISBN 978-84-450-7153-3.
- Polish: Hobbit z Objaśnieniami [The Hobbit with Explanations]. Wydawnictwo Bukowy Las. 2012. ISBN 978-83-62478-62-0.
- Hungarian: A Hobbit. Ciceró Könyvstúdió. 2006. ISBN 978-963-539-764-8.
- Chinese: 哈比人. Yilin Press. 2011. ISBN 978-7-5447-2527-9.

== See also ==
- The History of The Hobbit
- English-language editions of The Hobbit
