= The Nature of Middle-earth =

2021 compilation of material by J. R. R. Tolkien

- Editor: Carl F. Hostetter
- Author: J. R. R. Tolkien
- Language: English
- Genre: High fantasy
- Publisher: HarperCollins, Mariner Books
- Publication date: 2021
- Publication place: United Kingdom
- Media type: Print (hardback and paperback)
- Pages: 464
- ISBN: 978-0358454601
- Followed by: The Fall of Númenor

The Nature of Middle-earth is a 2021 book of previously unpublished materials on Tolkien's legendarium, compiled and edited by the scholar Carl F. Hostetter. Some essays were previously published in the Elvish linguistics journal Vinyar Tengwar, where Hostetter was a long-time editor.

== Book ==
=== Publication history ===
The book was published by HarperCollins and Mariner Books in 2021. It contains a selection of essays and fragments of stories by J. R. R. Tolkien, edited by the scholar Carl F. Hostetter, on questions related to the functioning of his fantasy world, Middle-earth.

The book's editor, Carl F. Hostetter, said in an interview before the book appeared that he "started work on what would become The Nature of Middle-earth nearly 25 years ago, when I received a bundle of photocopies that Christopher Tolkien referred to as 'late philological essays'."

=== Contents ===
The book is in three parts, with appendices. It provides many of the elements that Tolkien described in a letter: "while many [readers] demand maps, others wish for geological indications rather than places; many want Elvish grammars, phonologies, and specimens; some want metrics and prosodies... Musicians want tunes, and musical notation; archaeologists want ceramics and metallurgy. Botanists want a more accurate description of the mallorn, of elanor, niphredil, alfirin, mallos, and symbelmynë; and historians want more details about the social and political structure of Gondor; general enquirers want information on the Wainriders, the Harad, Dwarvish origins, the Dead Men, the Beornings, and the missing two wizards (out of five)".

Part One consists of 23 chapters on "Time and Ageing", including the Valian Year, questions of time-scales, and whether elvish time is different. Kane comments that the texts are "confusing" and sometimes "painfully detailed", illustrating Tolkien's remark that he found the "vast game ... only too fatally attractive".

Part Two contains 17 chapters on "Body, Mind, and Spirit", including issues of beauty, goodness, gender, and sex; which beings may have beards; fate and free will; whether elves reincarnate; what the Valar know and what visible forms they and the Maiar may take; and death. The material varies from "the most mundane to the most profound", examples of the latter being the way that the Valar could communicate thought, or that the Elves could create "mind-pictures" in the minds of Men, creating in Tolkien's words "Fantasy with a realism and immediacy beyond the compass of any human mechanism".

Part Three consists of 22 chapters on "The World, its Lands, and its Inhabitants", including such topics as darkness and light, how Lembas waybread is made, the eating of mushrooms, and Galadriel and Celeborn. The appendices cover metaphysical and theological themes, and a glossary of terms in Quenya. In "The Primal Impulse" and "The Powers of the Valar", Tolkien discusses the nature of creation in the world, and how every creative ability ultimately comes from Eru.

== Reception ==
Shaun Gunner of The Tolkien Society called the book "an unofficial 13th volume of The History of Middle-earth series".

Douglas C. Kane, in the Journal of Tolkien Research, wrote, with reference to Tolkien's phrases in On Fairy-Stories on how to make a "Secondary World", that the book certainly "helps to demonstrate just how much 'labour and thought', 'special skill', and 'a kind of elvish craft' ... Tolkien applied to the creation of his Secondary World, as well as the pitfalls that resulted." All the same, in Kane's view, some of the material is "unnecessarily redundant, confusing, and contradictory." Kane states that Hostetter "appears to overstep his role as editor" by presenting the materials according to his personal point of view. In particular, having quoted Tolkien's remark that The Lord of the Rings was fundamentally religious and Catholic (twice, at the start of Part 2 and in the first appendix), Hostetter argues that the description applies to the whole of the legendarium. Kane calls this contrary to Christopher Tolkien's editorial practice, and "a blatant statement of intent". He quotes Verlyn Flieger's remark that Tolkien's work reflects the two sides of his nature; the work can be seen both "as Catholic [and] not Christian".

The historian Bradley J. Birzer wrote in the National Review that this "new volume confirms that Tolkien was the 20th century's greatest mythmaker, and that his mythology will—if there is justice in the world—rank someday with that of Homer, Virgil, and Dante. Just as Homer gave us profound insights into the Greek world, Virgil into the Roman world, and Dante into the medieval world, Tolkien gave us great insights into the modern world. Everything Tolkien wrote matters."

Helios De Rosario Martínez notes in Tengwestië that the volume is rich in detail about the languages of Middle-earth, some of it already published in the linguistic journals Parma Eldalamberon and Vinyar Tengwar, some of it new.

== Sources ==
- Carpenter, Humphrey, ed. (2023) [1981]. The Letters of J. R. R. Tolkien: Revised and Expanded Edition. New York: HarperCollins. ISBN 978-0-35-865298-4.
- Tolkien, J. R. R. (1964). J. R. R. Tolkien: Tree and Leaf. London: HarperCollins.
