= Respective case =

The respective case (so named by Anthony Appleyard) is a noun case created by J. R. R. Tolkien in his constructed language Quenya (one of two of the elven languages which feature in The Lord of the Rings and The Silmarillion); Tolkien himself never named the case (at least, not in any of his published writings). Since the exact function of this noun case is unclear, a more neutral term for it is the "s-case", as it is formed by appending an -s suffix to the noun it modifies. It is unclear whether this case is used with prepositions, transitive or intransitive verbs, or whether it has a more general use. Based on a few examples, Helge Fauskanger has inferred the possibility that it is used as a kind of locative (e.g.: i coa i taures / i coa i tauressë the house in the forest).

Another possible use is to translate expressions with the preposition “about.” For example, in translating “He told me about the invasion,” the Quenya word for “invasion” might appear in the respective/s-case. The seeming absence of any other case being used to translate this preposition lends support to this conjecture. Ales Bican has written an article exploring these and other possible functions for Tolkien's respective/s-case.

An example of inflection of the word cirya (ship) including the respective is present:

	Singular	Plural	Partitive plural	Dual
Nominative	cirya	ciryar	ciryali	ciryat
Locative	ciryasse	ciryassen	ciryalisse(n)	ciryatse
Respective (s-case)	ciryas	ciryais	ciryalis	-
