= The History of The Hobbit =

2007 nonfiction book about The Hobbit

- First editions (UK)
- Editor: John D. Rateliff
- Author: J. R. R. Tolkien & John D. Rateliff
- Illustrator: J. R. R. Tolkien
- Cover artist: J. R. R. Tolkien
- Language: English
- Series: The History of The Hobbit
- Genre: Literary studies
- Publisher: HarperCollins (UK); Houghton Mifflin (US)
- Publication date: 2007
- Media type: Print
- Pages: 905

The History of The Hobbit is a two-volume study of J. R. R. Tolkien's 1937 children's fantasy novel The Hobbit. It was first published by HarperCollins in 2007. It contains Tolkien's unpublished drafts of the novel, with commentary by John D. Rateliff. It details Tolkien's various revisions to The Hobbit, including abandoned revisions for the unpublished third edition of the work, intended for 1960, as well as previously unpublished original maps and illustrations drawn by Tolkien.

The work provides the same sort of literary analysis of The Hobbit that Christopher Tolkien's 12-volume The History of Middle-earth provides for The Silmarillion and The Lord of the Rings. In Rateliff's view, the work is complementary to Douglas A. Anderson's 1988 work The Annotated Hobbit, which presents and comments upon a single text of the novel.

== Content ==
A page from Thorin's letter to Bilbo, detailing the contractual terms and conditions, handwritten in Tolkien's invented Tengwar script. The illustration is one of many in Rateliff's book that Tolkien had created to support his narrative.

=== Texts ===
The History of The Hobbit consists of a collection of Tolkien's draft versions of The Hobbit, together with John Rateliff's commentary upon them. Rateliff organizes the material into five phases of writing.

Phase 1 contains "The Pryftan Fragment" (6 pages, named for its early name for Smaug the dragon, representing the second half of Chapter 1) and "The Bladorthin Typescript" (12 pages, named for its early name for Gandalf the wizard, representing the first half of Chapter 1, and overlapping with the Fragment).

Most of the book is filled with a composite text of the manuscripts of phases 2 and 3 of J.R.R. Tolkien's drafting of The Hobbit, phase 2 being a nearly complete draft (continuing from the Typescript) and phase 3 being mainly a fair copy of that. Phase 3 consists of two typed versions (the incomplete "First Typescript" made by Tolkien, and the complete "Second Typescript" made by his son Michael after he had injured one of his hands) of Chapters 1 to 12 and a piece of Chapter 14, all based on the phase 2 manuscript. Tolkien found his son's typescript inaccurate and returned to the "First Typescript", correcting it in manuscript and sending it to the printers.

Phase 4 is Tolkien's rewritten version of the novel, ten years after its publication, in 1947. Phase 5 is his 1960 rewriting of Chapters 1 and 2, attempting to explain Gandalf's selection of Bilbo as the story's burglar.

=== Other materials ===
The book has numerous illustrations, including both materials that Tolkien intended to use to support the text (maps, Bilbo's contract written in Tengwar and supposedly preserved after being left by Thorin on the mantelpiece in Bag End, paintings), and images of Tolkien's manuscripts and letters. Rateliff has added detailed notes and appendices.

== Relationship to other literary studies ==
=== The History of Middle-earth ===
Navigable diagram of Tolkien's legendarium. The History of The Hobbit stands alongside Christopher Tolkien's 12-volume The History of Middle-earth.

When Christopher Tolkien began publishing The History of Middle-earth, a 12-volume series documenting his father's writing process in the creation of Middle-earth, with texts dating from the 1910s to the 1970s, he made a conscious decision not to issue a volume detailing the creation of The Hobbit. Instead, it focuses on Tolkien's legendarium, spanning the stories of The Silmarillion and The Lord of the Rings.

The task of creating a history of The Hobbit was given to Taum Santoski in the 1980s. Santoski had connections to the Marquette University collection of Tolkien material, which is where the original manuscripts reside. He died in 1991, and ultimately the task passed to the Inklings scholar John D. Rateliff. The History of The Hobbit is in a similar vein to the "literary archaeology" of Christopher Tolkien's The History of Middle-earth.

=== The Annotated Hobbit ===
Rateliff states in the introduction that The History of The Hobbit is intended to complement Douglas A. Anderson's 1988 The Annotated Hobbit. That book is a single text of Tolkien's novel, accompanied by Anderson's marginal notes, with over 150 illustrations by Tolkien and other artists. In contrast, Rateliff's book has three goals: to present and explicate the earliest manuscript of Tolkien's novel; to document the novel's close connection to The Silmarillion legendarium; and to explain what Tolkien was doing in the 1947 and 1960 revisions, the latter abortively seeking to harmonize the novel with The Lord of the Rings.

== Reception ==
The Tolkien scholar Tom Shippey welcomed the book, noting that until its appearance, the best-known history of The Hobbit was contained in Humphrey Carpenter's 1977 biography of Tolkien, which was clear, famous, and left several questions unanswered. Rateliff's account goes into much greater detail. Shippey commented that the two volumes "lead us into the very engine-room of [Tolkien's] creation." He was surprised to discover that Tolkien was initially "rather unconcerned about names"; for instance, Thorin's grandfather, who made the map of the Lonely Mountain, was initially called "Fimbulfambi" rather than "the appropriately dwarvish name Thror". "Fimbulfambi" is Eddic, but it means "great fool, a person who cannot make conversation". Shippey discussed whether the text of The Hobbit could now be described as final, given all the variants that Rateliff documents, and noting Tolkien's struggles with the mistaken corrections made by proof-readers and copy-editors; he concluded that it was possibly now time to leave the text alone. He added that they "will take a great deal of digesting", providing "vital primary evidence for scholarship" and "great entertainment" for Tolkien fans.

Jason Fisher, reviewing the book for Mythlore, said it was worth the very long wait (from 1991), describing the account as "riveting". The book had three purposes: to present the earliest manuscript version; to show that it was, pace Christopher Tolkien, connected to the tradition of The Silmarillion; and to examine both Tolkien's revision of 1947 giving the familiar text, and his abandoned 1960 rewrite, which would have refashioned the whole book "to bring it into greater harmony with the mood, language, and geography of The Lord of the Rings." Fisher describes the books' layout as "meticulously systematic" and comparable to Christopher Tolkien's History of Middle-earth. He finds the book rich in "wonderful surprises", among them that Thorin Oakenshield would have been Gandalf the Dwarf, while the Wizard of that name would have been called Bladorthin; and Tolkien considered having Bilbo Baggins the hobbit navigate Mirkwood using a ball of rolled-up spider silk "like Theseus in the Minotaur's labyrinth". He enjoyed, too, the appendices with previously unpublished illustrations, including a facsimile of the Dwarves' letter which Bilbo found under the clock on his mantelpiece. For Fisher, however, the most interesting addition was the unfinished 1960 rewrite of the first three chapters, adding detail of passing through Bree, for example, but losing much of the humour. In his view, it was just as well that Tolkien abandoned the attempt. He was more critical of Rateliff's essays, which he found generally but not uniformly illuminating and erudite. All the same, the book was in his view ambitious, brilliant, and indispensable.
