= The Hobbit =

1937 book by J. R. R. Tolkien

The Hobbit, or There and Back Again
- Cover of the 1937 first edition, from a drawing by Tolkien
- Author: J. R. R. Tolkien
- Illustrator: J. R. R. Tolkien
- Cover artist: J. R. R. Tolkien
- Language: English
- Genre: High fantasy; Children's fantasy
- Set in: Middle-earth
- Publisher: George Allen & Unwin (UK)
- Publication date: 21 September 1937
- Publication place: United Kingdom
- Pages: 310 (first edition)
- OCLC: 1827184
- LC Class: PR6039.O32 H63
- Followed by: The Lord of the Rings

The Hobbit, or There and Back Again is a children's fantasy novel by the English author J. R. R. Tolkien. It was published in 1937 to wide critical acclaim, being nominated for the Carnegie Medal and awarded a prize from the New York Herald Tribune for best juvenile fiction. It is recognized as a classic in children's literature and is one of the best-selling books of all time, with over 100 million copies sold.

The Hobbit is set in Middle-earth and follows home-loving Bilbo Baggins, the titular hobbit who joins the wizard Gandalf and the thirteen dwarves of Thorin's Company on a quest to reclaim the dwarves' home and treasure from the dragon Smaug. Bilbo's journey takes him from his peaceful rural surroundings into more sinister territory.

The story is told in the form of a picaresque or episodic quest; several chapters introduce a new type of monster or threat as Bilbo progresses through the landscape. Bilbo gains a new level of maturity, competence, and wisdom by accepting the disreputable, romantic, fey and adventurous sides of his nature and applying his wits and common sense. The story reaches its climax in the Battle of Five Armies, where many of the characters and creatures from earlier chapters re-emerge to engage in conflict. Personal growth and forms of heroism are central themes of the story, along with motifs of warfare. These themes have led critics to view Tolkien's own experiences during the First World War as instrumental in shaping the story. His scholarly knowledge of Germanic philology and interest in mythology and fairy tales are often noted as influences, but more recent fiction including adventure stories and the works of William Morris also played a part.

The publisher was encouraged by the book's critical and financial success and, therefore, requested a sequel. As Tolkien's work progressed on its successor, The Lord of the Rings, he made retrospective accommodations for it in The Hobbit. These few but significant changes were integrated into the second edition. Further editions followed with minor emendations, including those reflecting Tolkien's changing concept of the world into which Bilbo stumbled. The work has never been out of print. Its ongoing legacy encompasses many adaptations for stage, screen, radio, board games and video games. Several of these adaptations have received critical recognition on their own merits.

== Narrative ==
=== Characters ===
Bilbo Baggins, the protagonist, is a respectable, reserved and well-to-do hobbit—a race resembling short humans with furry, leathery feet who live in underground houses and are mainly farmers and gardeners. Gandalf, an itinerant wizard, introduces Bilbo to a company of thirteen dwarves. Thorin Oakenshield is the proud, pompous head of the company of dwarves and heir to the destroyed dwarvish kingdom under the Lonely Mountain. Smaug is a dragon who long ago pillaged the dwarvish kingdom of Thorin's grandfather and sleeps upon the vast treasure.

The plot involves a host of other characters of varying importance, such as the twelve other dwarves of the company; two types of elves: both puckish and more serious warrior types; Men; man-eating trolls; boulder-throwing giants; evil cave-dwelling goblins; forest-dwelling giant spiders who can speak; immense and heroic eagles who also speak; evil wolves, or Wargs, who are allied with the goblins; Elrond the sage; Gollum, a strange creature inhabiting an underground lake; Beorn, a man who can assume bear form; and Bard the Bowman, a grim but honourable archer of Lake-town.

=== Plot ===
Gandalf tricks Bilbo Baggins into hosting a party for Thorin Oakenshield and his band of twelve dwarves (Dwalin, Balin, Kili, Fili, Dori, Nori, Ori, Oin, Gloin, Bifur, Bofur and Bombur), who go over their plans to reclaim their ancient home, the Lonely Mountain, and its vast treasure from the dragon Smaug. Gandalf unveils Thror's map showing a secret door into the Mountain and proposes that dumbfounded Bilbo should serve as the expedition's "burglar". The dwarves ridicule the idea, but Bilbo, indignant, sets off with them.

The group travels into the wild. Gandalf saves the company from trolls and leads them to Rivendell, where Elrond reveals more secrets from the map. When they attempt to cross the Misty Mountains, they are caught by goblins and driven deep underground. Although Gandalf kills the goblin king and rescues them, Bilbo gets separated from the others as they flee the goblins. Lost in the goblin tunnels, he stumbles across a mysterious ring and then encounters Gollum, who engages him in a game, each posing a riddle until one of them cannot solve it. If Bilbo wins, Gollum will show him the way out of the tunnels, but if he fails, his life will be forfeit. With the help of the ring, which confers invisibility when worn, Bilbo escapes and rejoins the dwarves, improving his reputation with them. The goblins and Wargs give chase, but the company are saved by eagles. They rest in the house of the skin-changer Beorn.

Sketch map of Mirkwood, Erebor (the Lonely Mountain), and Esgaroth (Lake-town)

The company enters the dark forest of Mirkwood without Gandalf, who has other responsibilities. In Mirkwood, Bilbo first saves the dwarves from giant spiders and then from the dungeons of the Wood-elves. Nearing the Lonely Mountain, the travellers are welcomed by the human inhabitants of Lake-town, who hope the dwarves will fulfil prophecies of Smaug's demise. The expedition reaches the mountain and finds the secret door. The dwarves send a reluctant Bilbo inside to scout the dragon's lair. He steals a great cup and, while conversing with Smaug, spots a gap in the ancient dragon's armour. The enraged dragon, deducing that Lake-town has aided the intruders, flies off to destroy the town. A thrush overhears Bilbo's report of Smaug's vulnerability and tells a Lake-town resident named Bard. Smaug wreaks havoc on the town, until Bard shoots an arrow into the chink in Smaug's armour, killing the dragon.

When the dwarves take possession of the mountain, Bilbo finds the Arkenstone, the most-treasured heirloom of Thorin's family, and hides it away. The Wood-elves and Lake-men request compensation for Lake-town's destruction and settlement of old claims on the treasure. When Thorin refuses to give them anything, they besiege the mountain. However, Thorin manages to send a message to his kinfolk in the Iron Hills and reinforces his position. Bilbo slips out and gives the Arkenstone to the besiegers, hoping to head off a war. When they offer the jewel to Thorin in exchange for treasure, Bilbo reveals how they obtained it. Thorin, furious at what he sees as betrayal, banishes Bilbo, and battle seems inevitable when Dain, Thorin's second cousin, arrives with an army of dwarf warriors.

Gandalf reappears to warn all of an approaching army of goblins and Wargs. The dwarves, men and elves band together, but only with the timely arrival of the eagles and Beorn, who fights in his bear form and kills the goblin general, do they win the climactic Battle of Five Armies. Thorin is fatally wounded and reconciles with Bilbo before he dies.

Bilbo accepts only a small portion of his share of the treasure, having no want or need for more, but still returns home a very wealthy hobbit roughly a year and a month after he first left. Years later, he writes the story of his adventures.

== Concept and creation ==
=== Background ===
In the early 1930s Tolkien was pursuing an academic career at the University of Oxford as Rawlinson and Bosworth Professor of Anglo-Saxon, with a fellowship at Pembroke College. Several of his poems had been published in magazines and small collections, including Goblin Feet and The Cat and the Fiddle: A Nursery Rhyme Undone and its Scandalous Secret Unlocked, a reworking of Hey Diddle Diddle, an English nursery rhyme. His creative endeavours at this time also included letters from Father Christmas to his children—illustrated manuscripts that featured warring gnomes and goblins, and a helpful polar bear—alongside the creation of elven languages and an attendant mythology, including The Book of Lost Tales, which he had been creating since 1917. These works were all published posthumously.

In a 1955 letter to W. H. Auden, Tolkien recollects that he began The Hobbit one day early in the 1930s. While he was marking School Certificate papers, he found a blank page. Suddenly inspired, he wrote the words, "In a hole in the ground there lived a hobbit." By late 1932, he had finished the story and then lent the manuscript to several friends, including C. S. Lewis and a student of Tolkien's named Elaine Griffiths. In 1936, when Griffiths was visited in Oxford by Susan Dagnall, a staff member of the publisher George Allen & Unwin, she is reported to have either lent Dagnall the book or suggested that she should borrow it from Tolkien. In any event, Dagnall was impressed by it, and showed the book to Stanley Unwin, who then asked his 10-year-old son Rayner to review it. Rayner's favourable comments settled Allen & Unwin's decision to publish Tolkien's book.

=== Setting ===
The setting of The Hobbit, as described on its original dust jacket, is an "ancient time between the age of Faerie and the dominion of men" in an unnamed fantasy world. The world is shown on the endpaper map as "Western Lands" westward and "Wilderland" as the east.

Tolkien's biographer Humphrey Carpenter states that The Hobbit was initially conceived as a largely self-contained fairy-tale, separate from the complex mythology Tolkien had been developing privately. As Tolkien began work on The Lord of the Rings, however, he gradually integrated The Hobbit into his legendarium, situating its events within the later part of the "Third Age" of Middle Earth within Arda.

=== Illustration and design ===
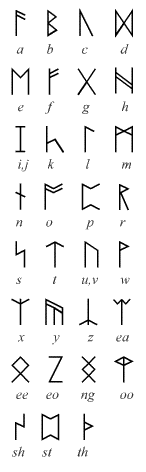
Anglo-Saxon runes and their English letter values, used in Tolkien's The Hobbit illustrations

Tolkien's correspondence and publisher's records show that he was involved in the design and illustration of the entire book. All elements were the subject of considerable correspondence and fussing over by Tolkien. Rayner Unwin, in his publishing memoir, comments: "In 1937 alone Tolkien wrote 26 letters to George Allen & Unwin... detailed, fluent, often pungent, but infinitely polite and exasperatingly precise... I doubt any author today, however famous, would get such scrupulous attention."

Even the maps, of which Tolkien originally proposed five, were considered and debated. He wished Thror's Map to be tipped in (that is, glued in after the book has been bound) at first mention in the text, and with the moon letter runes on the reverse so they could be seen when held up to the light. In the end the cost, as well as the shading of the maps, which would be difficult to reproduce, resulted in the final design of two maps as endpapers, Thror's map, and the Map of Wilderland (see Rhovanion), both printed in black and red on the paper's cream background.

Originally Allen & Unwin planned to illustrate the book only with the endpaper maps, but Tolkien's first tendered sketches so charmed the publisher's staff that they opted to include them without raising the book's price despite the extra cost. Thus encouraged, Tolkien supplied a second batch of illustrations. The publisher accepted all of these as well, giving the first edition ten black-and-white illustrations plus the two endpaper maps. The illustrated scenes were: The Hill: Hobbiton-across-the-Water, The Trolls, The Mountain Path, The Misty Mountains looking West from the Eyrie towards Goblin Gate, Beorn's Hall, Mirkwood, The Elvenking's Gate, Lake Town, The Front Gate and The Hall at Bag-End. All but one of the illustrations were a full page, and one, the Mirkwood illustration, required a separate plate.

Satisfied with his skills, the publishers asked Tolkien to design a dust jacket. This project, too, became the subject of many iterations and much correspondence, with Tolkien always writing disparagingly of his own ability to draw. The runic inscription around the edges of the illustration are a phonetic transliteration of English, giving the title of the book and details of the author and publisher. The original jacket design contained several shades of various colours, but Tolkien redrew it several times using fewer colours each time. His final design consisted of four colours. The publishers, mindful of the cost, removed the red from the sun to end up with only black, blue, and green ink on white stock.

The publisher's production staff designed a binding, but Tolkien objected to several elements. Through several iterations, the final design ended up as mostly the author's. The spine shows runes: two "þ" (Thrain and Thror) runes and one "d" (door). The front and back covers were mirror images of each other, with an elongated dragon characteristic of Tolkien's style stamped along the lower edge, and with a sketch of the Misty Mountains stamped along the upper edge.

Swedish and Finnish book covers of The Hobbit illustrated by Tove Jansson

Once illustrations were approved for the book, Tolkien proposed colour plates as well. The publisher would not relent on this, so Tolkien pinned his hopes on the American edition to be published about six months later. Houghton Mifflin rewarded these hopes with the replacement of the frontispiece (The Hill: Hobbiton-across-the Water) in colour and the addition of new colour plates: Rivendell, Bilbo Woke Up with the Early Sun in His Eyes, Bilbo comes to the Huts of the Raft-elves and Conversation with Smaug, which features a dwarvish curse written in Tolkien's invented script Tengwar, and signed with two "þ" ("Th") runes. The additional illustrations proved so appealing that George Allen & Unwin adopted the colour plates as well for their second printing, with exception of Bilbo Woke Up with the Early Sun in His Eyes.

Different editions have been illustrated in diverse ways. Many follow the original scheme at least loosely, but many others are illustrated by other artists, especially the many translated editions. Some cheaper editions, particularly paperback, are not illustrated except with the maps. "The Children's Book Club" edition of 1942 includes the black-and-white pictures but no maps, an anomaly. Douglas Anderson's The Annotated Hobbit is illustrated with many black-and-white drawings taken from translations of the story into some 25 languages.

Tolkien's use of runes, both as decorative devices and as magical signs within the story, has been cited as a major cause for the popularization of runes within "New Age" and esoteric literature, stemming from Tolkien's popularity with the elements of counter-culture in the 1970s.

=== Genre ===
The Hobbit takes cues from narrative models of children's literature, as shown by its omniscient narrator and characters that young children can relate to, such as the small, food-obsessed, and morally ambiguous Bilbo. The text emphasizes the relationship between time and narrative progress and it openly distinguishes "safe" from "dangerous" in its geography. Both are key elements of works intended for children, as is the "home-away-home" (or there and back again) plot structure typical of the Bildungsroman. While Tolkien later claimed to dislike the aspect of the narrative voice addressing the reader directly, the narrative voice contributes significantly to the success of the novel. The scholar Lois R. Kuznets comments that the "obtrusive narrator" is part of a standard "rhetoric of childhood"; C. W. Sullivan III adds that Tolkien may have taken the idea of an intrusive narrator from the medieval texts Beowulf and Sir Gawain and the Green Knight. Emer O'Sullivan, in her Comparative Children's Literature, notes The Hobbit as one of a handful of children's books that have been accepted into mainstream literature, alongside Jostein Gaarder's Sophie's World (1991) and J. K. Rowling's Harry Potter series (1997–2007).

Tolkien intended The Hobbit as a "fairy-story" and wrote it in a tone suited to addressing children; he said later that the book was not specifically written for children, but had rather been created out of his interest in mythology and legend. Many of the initial reviews refer to the work as a fairy story. However, according to Jack Zipes writing in The Oxford Companion to Fairy Tales, Bilbo is an atypical character for a fairy tale. The work is much longer than Tolkien's ideal proposed in his essay On Fairy-Stories. Many fairy tale motifs, such as the repetition of similar events seen in the dwarves' arrival at Bilbo's and Beorn's homes, and folklore themes, such as trolls turning to stone, are to be found in the story.

The book is popularly called (and often marketed as) a fantasy novel, but like Peter Pan and Wendy by J. M. Barrie and The Princess and the Goblin by George MacDonald, both of which influenced Tolkien and contain fantasy elements, it is primarily identified as being children's literature. The two genres are not mutually exclusive, so some definitions of high fantasy include works for children by authors such as L. Frank Baum and Lloyd Alexander alongside the works of Gene Wolfe and Jonathan Swift, which are more often considered adult literature. The Hobbit has been called "the most popular of all twentieth-century fantasies written for children". Jane Chance, however, considers the book to be a children's novel only in the sense that it appeals to the child in an adult reader. Sullivan credits the first publication of The Hobbit as an important step in the development of high fantasy, and further credits the 1960s paperback debuts of The Hobbit and The Lord of the Rings as essential to the creation of a mass market for fiction of this kind as well as the fantasy genre's current status.

=== Style ===
Tolkien's prose is unpretentious and straightforward, taking as given the existence of his imaginary world and describing its details in a matter-of-fact way, while often introducing the new and fantastic in an almost casual manner. This down-to-earth style, also found in later fantasy such as Richard Adams's Watership Down and Peter Beagle's The Last Unicorn, accepts readers into the fictional world, rather than cajoling or attempting to convince them of its reality. While The Hobbit is written in a simple, friendly language, each of its characters has a unique voice. The narrator, who occasionally interrupts the narrative flow with asides (a device common to both children's and Anglo-Saxon literature), has his own linguistic style separate from those of the main characters.

The basic form of the story is that of a quest, narrated in episodes. Tolkien achieves balance of humour and danger, as seen in the foolishness and Cockney dialect of the trolls and in the drunkenness of the elven captors. The general form—that of a journey into strange lands, told in a light-hearted mood and interspersed with songs—may be following the model of The Icelandic Journals by William Morris, an important literary influence on Tolkien.

== Influences ==
=== Norse mythology ===
Tolkien's works show many influences from Norse mythology, reflecting his lifelong passion for those stories and his academic interest in Germanic philology. The Hobbit is no exception to this; the work shows influences from northern European literature, myths and languages, especially from the Poetic Edda and the Prose Edda. Examples include the names of the dwarves, Fili, Kili, Oin, Gloin, Bifur, Bofur, Bombur, Dori, Nori, Dwalin, Balin, Dain, Nain and Thorin Oakenshield, along with Gandalf which was a dwarf-name in the Norse. (Note: The names derive directly from the Old Norse names Fíli, Kíli, Oin, Glói, Bivör, Bávörr, Bömburr, Dori, Nóri, Dvalinn, Bláin, Dain, Nain, Þorin, Eikinskialdi, and Gandálfr in the Dvergatal, the list of Dwarves in the Völuspá within the Poetic Edda.) But while their names are Norse, the characters of the dwarves are based on fairy tales such as Snow White and Snow-White and Rose-Red as collected by the Brothers Grimm, while the latter tale may have influenced the character of Beorn.

Tolkien's use of descriptive names such as Misty Mountains and Bag End echoes the names used in Old Norse sagas. The names of the dwarf-friendly ravens, such as Roäc, are derived from the Old Norse words for "raven" and "rook", but their peaceful characters are unlike the typical carrion birds from Old Norse and Old English literature. Tolkien is not simply skimming historical sources for effect: the juxtaposition of old and new styles of expression is seen by the Tolkien scholar Tom Shippey as one of the major themes explored in The Hobbit. Maps figure in both saga literature and The Hobbit.

=== Old English literature ===
Themes from Old English literature, especially from Beowulf, shape the ancient world which Bilbo stepped into. Tolkien, a scholar of Beowulf, counted the epic among his "most valued sources" for The Hobbit. Tolkien was one of the first critics to treat Beowulf as a literary work with value beyond the merely historical, with his 1936 lecture "Beowulf: The Monsters and the Critics". Tolkien borrowed several elements from Beowulf, including a monstrous, intelligent dragon. Certain descriptions in The Hobbit seem to have been lifted straight out of Beowulf with some minor rewording, such as when the dragon stretches its neck out to sniff for intruders. Likewise, Tolkien's descriptions of the lair as accessed through a secret passage mirror those in Beowulf. Other specific plot elements and features in The Hobbit that show similarities to Beowulf include the title of thief, as Bilbo is called by Gollum and later by Smaug, and Smaug's personality, which leads to the destruction of Lake-town. Tolkien refines parts of Beowulf's plot that he appears to have found less than satisfactorily described, such as details about the cup-thief and the dragon's intellect and personality.

Named swords of renown, adorned with runes, similarly have Old English connections. In using his elf-sword, Bilbo finally takes his first independent heroic action. By his naming the sword "Sting" we see Bilbo's acceptance of the kinds of cultural and linguistic practices found in Beowulf, signifying his entrance into the ancient world in which he found himself. This progression culminates in Bilbo stealing a cup from the dragon's hoard, rousing him to wrath—an incident directly mirroring Beowulf and an action entirely determined by traditional narrative patterns. As Tolkien wrote, "The episode of the theft arose naturally (and almost inevitably) from the circumstances. It is difficult to think of any other way of conducting the story at this point. I fancy the author of Beowulf would say much the same." The name of the wizard Radagast is taken from the name of the Slavic deity Radogost.

=== Medieval and mythological sources ===
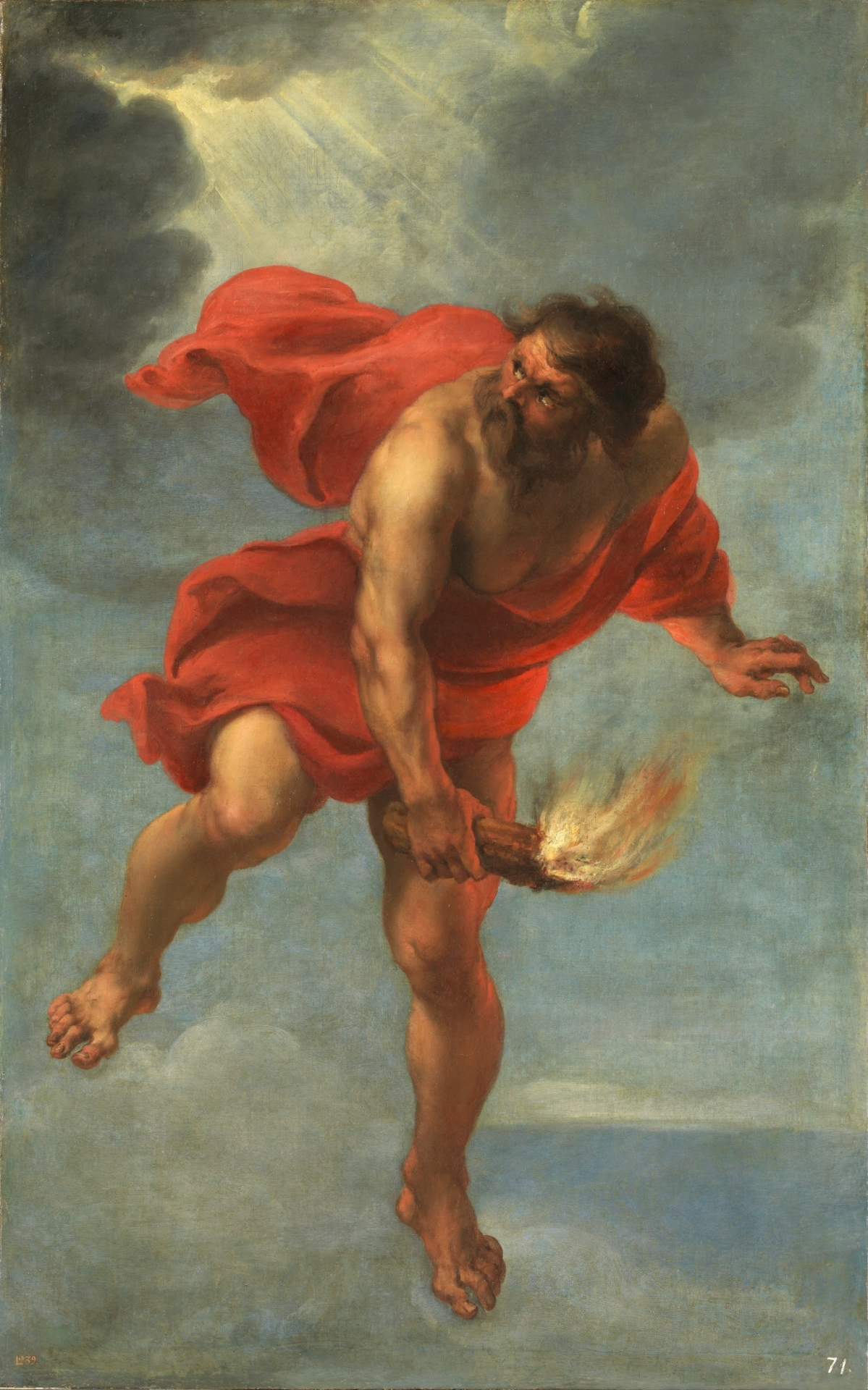
Bilbo's role as burglar places him in the trickster tradition of figures like Prometheus who stole fire from the gods. Painting by Jan Cossiers, 1637

The representation of the dwarves in The Hobbit was influenced by his own selective reading of medieval texts regarding the Jewish people and their history. The dwarves' characteristics of being dispossessed of their ancient homeland at the Lonely Mountain, and living among other groups whilst retaining their own culture are all derived from the medieval image of Jews, whilst their warlike nature stems from accounts in the Hebrew Bible. The Dwarvish calendar invented for The Hobbit reflects the Jewish calendar which begins in late autumn. And although Tolkien denied that he used allegory, the dwarves taking Bilbo out of his complacent existence has been seen as an eloquent metaphor for the "impoverishment of Western society without Jews."

The scholar of literature James L. Hodge describes the story as picaresque, a genre of fiction in which a hero relies on his wits to survive a series of risky episodes. Hodge further likens Bilbo's admittedly unheroic business of burglary to the trickster role of some pagan gods and mythical figures: Hermes steals cattle from Apollo, Prometheus and Coyote steal fire, Odin steals the mead of poetry, and so on. Hodge quotes the psychiatrist Carl Jung as saying that the figure of the trickster occurs in every age, whether in sacred rites or picaresque stories. Jaume Albero Poveda similarly calls the "comical episodes" like the riddle game between Bilbo and Gollum "typical of the picaresque novel".

=== 19th century fiction ===
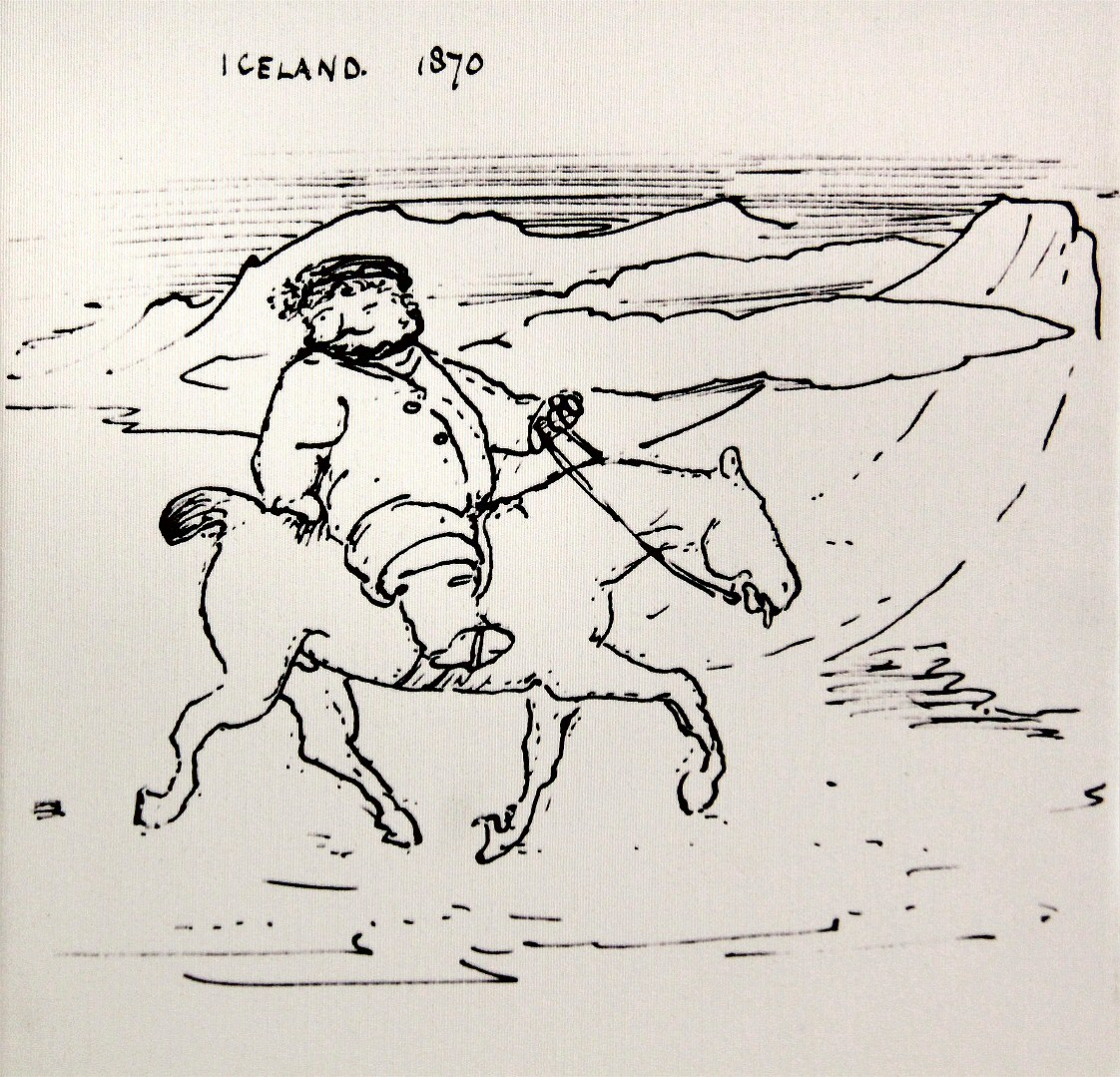
Bilbo's character and adventures match many details of William Morris's expedition in Iceland. 1870 cartoon of Morris riding a pony by his travelling companion Edward Burne-Jones

Tolkien wished to imitate the prose and poetry romances of the 19th-century Arts and Crafts polymath William Morris in style and approach. The Desolation of Smaug, portraying dragons as detrimental to landscape, is a motif explicitly borrowed from Morris. The Tolkien scholar Marjorie Burns writes that Bilbo's character and adventures match many details of Morris's expedition in Iceland. She comments, for instance, that the humorous drawings of Morris riding through the wilds of Iceland by his friend the artist Edward Burne-Jones can serve well as models for Bilbo on his adventures.

Tolkien wrote of being impressed as a boy by Samuel Rutherford Crockett's historical novel The Black Douglas and of basing the Necromancer—Sauron—on its villain, Gilles de Retz. Incidents in both The Hobbit and Lord of the Rings are similar in narrative and style to the novel, and its overall style and imagery have been suggested as having had an influence on Tolkien.

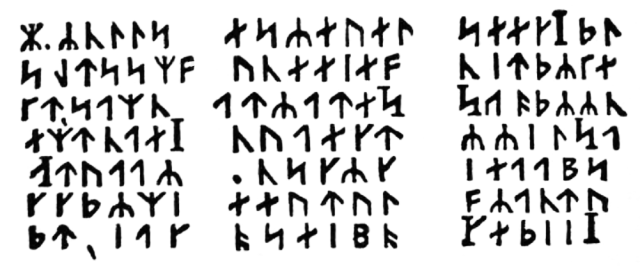
Verne's runic cryptogram from Journey to the Center of the Earth

The Tolkien scholar Mark T. Hooker has catalogued a lengthy series of parallels between The Hobbit and Jules Verne's 1864 Journey to the Center of the Earth. These include, among other things, a hidden runic message and a celestial alignment that direct the adventurers to the goals of their quests.

Tolkien's portrayal of goblins in The Hobbit was particularly influenced by George MacDonald's The Princess and the Goblin. However, MacDonald's influence on Tolkien was more profound than the shaping of individual characters and episodes; his works helped Tolkien form his whole thinking on the role of fantasy within his Christian faith.

== Critical analysis ==
=== Themes ===
The evolution and maturation of the protagonist, Bilbo Baggins, is central to the story. This journey of maturation, where Bilbo gains a clear sense of identity and confidence in the outside world, may be seen in psychological terms as a Bildungsroman rather than a traditional quest. The Jungian concept of individuation is also reflected through this theme of growing maturity and capability, with the author contrasting Bilbo's personal growth against the arrested development of the dwarves. Thus, while Gandalf exerts a parental influence over Bilbo early on, it is Bilbo who gradually takes over leadership of the party, a fact the dwarves could not bear to acknowledge. The analogue of the "underworld" and the hero returning from it with a boon (such as the ring, or Elvish blades) that benefits his society is seen to fit the mythic archetypes regarding initiation and male coming-of-age as described by Joseph Campbell. Chance compares the development and growth of Bilbo against other characters to the concepts of just kingship versus sinful kingship derived from the Ancrene Wisse (which Tolkien had written on in 1929), and a Christian understanding of Beowulf. Shippey comments that Bilbo is nothing like a king, and that Chance's talk of "types" just muddies the waters, though he agrees with her that there are "self-images of Tolkien" throughout his fiction; and she is right, too, in seeing Middle-earth as a balance between creativity and scholarship, "Germanic past and Christian present".

The overcoming of greed and selfishness has been seen as the central moral of the story. Whilst greed is a recurring theme in the novel, with many of the episodes stemming from one or more of the characters' simple desire for food (be it trolls eating dwarves or dwarves eating Wood-elf fare) or a desire for beautiful objects, such as gold and jewels, it is only by the Arkenstone's influence upon Thorin that greed, and its attendant vices "coveting" and "malignancy", come fully to the fore in the story and provide the moral crux of the tale. Bilbo steals the Arkenstone—a most ancient relic of the dwarves—and attempts to ransom it to Thorin for peace. However, Thorin turns on the Hobbit as a traitor, disregarding all the promises and "at your services" he had previously bestowed. In the end Bilbo gives up the precious stone and most of his share of the treasure to help those in greater need. Tolkien also explores the motif of jewels that inspire intense greed that corrupts those who covet them in the Silmarillion, and there are connections between the words "Arkenstone" and "Silmaril" in Tolkien's invented etymologies.

The Hobbit employs themes of animism. An important concept in anthropology and child development, animism is the idea that all things—including inanimate objects and natural events, such as storms or purses, as well as living things like animals and plants—possess human-like intelligence. John D. Rateliff calls this the "Doctor Dolittle Theme" in The History of The Hobbit, and cites the multitude of talking animals as indicative of this theme. These sapient beings include ravens, a thrush, spiders and the dragon Smaug, alongside the anthropomorphic goblins and elves. Patrick Curry notes that animism is also found in Tolkien's other works, and mentions the "roots of mountains" and "feet of trees" in The Hobbit as a linguistic shifting in level from the inanimate to animate. Tolkien saw the idea of animism as closely linked to the emergence of human language and myth: "...The first men to talk of 'trees and stars' saw things very differently. To them, the world was alive with mythological beings... To them the whole of creation was 'myth-woven and elf-patterned'."

=== Interpretation ===
As in plot and setting, Tolkien brings his literary theories to bear in forming characters and their interactions. He portrays Bilbo as a modern anachronism exploring an essentially antique world. Bilbo is able to negotiate and interact within this antique world because language and tradition make connections between the two worlds. For example, Gollum's riddles are taken from old historical sources, while those of Bilbo come from modern nursery books. It is the form of the riddle game, familiar to both, which allows Gollum and Bilbo to engage each other, rather than the content of the riddles themselves. This idea of a superficial contrast between characters' individual linguistic style, tone and sphere of interest, leading to an understanding of the deeper unity between the ancient and modern, is a recurring theme in The Hobbit.

Smaug is the main antagonist. In many ways the Smaug episode reflects and references the dragon of Beowulf, and Tolkien uses the episode to put into practice some of the ground-breaking literary theories he had developed about the Old English poem in its portrayal of the dragon as having bestial intelligence. Tolkien greatly prefers this motif over the later medieval trend of using the dragon as a symbolic or allegorical figure, such as in the legend of Saint George and the Dragon. Smaug the dragon with his golden hoard may be seen as an example of the traditional relationship between evil and metallurgy as collated in the depiction of Pandæmonium with its "Belched fire and rolling smoke" in John Milton's Paradise Lost. Of all the characters, Smaug's speech is the most modern, using idioms such as "Don't let your imagination run away with you!"

Just as Tolkien's literary theories have been seen to influence the tale, so have Tolkien's experiences. The Hobbit may be read as Tolkien's parable of World War I with the hero being plucked from his rural home and thrown into a far-off war where traditional types of heroism are shown to be futile. The tale as such explores the theme of heroism. As Janet Brennan Croft notes, Tolkien's literary reaction to war at this time differed from most post-war writers by eschewing irony as a method for distancing events and instead using mythology to mediate his experiences. Similarities to the works of other writers who faced the First World War are seen in The Hobbit, including portraying warfare as anti-pastoral: in "The Desolation of Smaug", both the area under the influence of Smaug before his demise and the setting for the Battle of Five Armies later are described as barren, damaged landscapes. The Hobbit makes a warning against repeating the tragedies of the First World War, and Tolkien's attitude as a veteran may well be summed up by Bilbo's comment: "Victory after all, I suppose! Well, it seems a very gloomy business."

== Reception ==
On its publication in September 1937, The Hobbit was met with almost unanimously favourable reviews from publications both in Britain and America, including The Times, Catholic World, and New York Post. C. S. Lewis, friend of Tolkien (and later author of The Chronicles of Narnia between 1949 and 1954), writing in The Times reports:

The truth is that in this book a number of good things, never before united, have come together: a fund of humour, an understanding of children, and a happy fusion of the scholar's with the poet's grasp of mythology... The professor has the air of inventing nothing. He has studied trolls and dragons at first hand and describes them with that fidelity that is worth oceans of glib "originality."

Lewis compares the book to Alice in Wonderland in that both children and adults may find different things to enjoy in it, and places it alongside Flatland, Phantastes, and The Wind in the Willows. W. H. Auden, in his review of the sequel The Fellowship of the Ring, calls The Hobbit "one of the best children's stories of this century".

The Hobbit was nominated for the Carnegie Medal and awarded a prize from the New York Herald Tribune for best juvenile fiction of 1938. More recently, the book has been recognized as "Most Important 20th-Century Novel (for Older Readers)" in the Children's Books of the Century poll in Books for Keeps. In 2012 it was ranked number 14 on a list of the top 100 children's novels published by School Library Journal.

Publication of the sequel The Lord of the Rings altered many critics' reception of the work. Instead of approaching The Hobbit as a children's book in its own right, critics such as Randel Helms picked up on the idea of The Hobbit as being a "prelude", relegating the story to a dry-run for the later work. Countering a presentist interpretation are those who say this approach misses out on much of the original's value as a children's book and as a work of high fantasy in its own right, and that it disregards the book's influence on these genres. Commentators such as Paul Kocher, John D. Rateliff and C. W. Sullivan encourage readers to treat the works separately, both because The Hobbit was conceived, published, and received independently of the later work, and to avoid dashing readers' expectations of tone and style.

== Publication ==
Dustcover of the first edition of The Hobbit, taken from a design by the author

George Allen & Unwin published the first edition of The Hobbit on 21 September 1937 with a print run of 1,500 copies, which sold out by December because of enthusiastic reviews. This first printing was illustrated in black and white by Tolkien, who designed the dust jacket as well. Houghton Mifflin of Boston and New York reset type for an American edition, to be released early in 1938, in which four of the illustrations would be colour plates. Allen & Unwin decided to incorporate the colour illustrations into their second printing, released at the end of 1937. Despite the book's popularity, paper rationing due to World War II and not ending until 1949 meant that the Allen & Unwin edition of the book was often unavailable during this period.

Subsequent editions in English were published in 1951, 1966, 1978, and 1995. Numerous English-language editions of The Hobbit have been produced by several publishers. The book has been translated into over sixty languages, with more than one published version for some languages.

=== Revisions ===
Navigable diagram of Tolkien's legendarium. The Hobbit began as a stand-alone story, but with the writing of The Lord of the Rings, Tolkien felt the need to bring it into closer alignment with that work.

In December 1937 The Hobbit's publisher, Stanley Unwin, asked Tolkien for a sequel. In response Tolkien provided drafts for The Silmarillion, but the editors rejected them, believing that the public wanted "more about hobbits". Tolkien subsequently began work on The New Hobbit, which would eventually become The Lord of the Rings, a course that would not only change the context of the original story, but lead to substantial changes to the character of Gollum.

In the first edition of The Hobbit, Gollum willingly bets his magic ring on the outcome of the riddle-game, and he and Bilbo part amicably. In the second edition edits, to reflect the new concept of the One Ring and its corrupting abilities, Tolkien made Gollum more aggressive towards Bilbo and distraught at losing the ring. The encounter ends with Gollum's curse, "Thief! Thief, Thief, Baggins! We hates it, we hates it, we hates it forever!" This presages Gollum's portrayal in The Lord of the Rings.

Tolkien sent this revised version of the chapter "Riddles in the Dark" to Unwin as an example of the kinds of changes needed to bring the book into conformity with The Lord of the Rings, but he heard nothing back for years. When he was sent galley proofs of a new edition, Tolkien was surprised to find that the sample text had been incorporated. In The Lord of the Rings, the original version of the riddle game is explained as a lie made up by Bilbo under the harmful influence of the Ring, whereas the revised version contains the "true" account. The revised text became the second edition, published in 1951 in both the UK and the US.

Tolkien began a new version in 1960, attempting to adjust the tone of The Hobbit to its sequel. He abandoned the new revision at chapter three after he received criticism that it "just wasn't The Hobbit", implying it had lost much of its light-hearted tone and quick pace.

After an unauthorized paperback edition of The Lord of the Rings appeared from Ace Books in 1965, Houghton Mifflin and Ballantine Books asked Tolkien to refresh the text of The Hobbit to renew the US copyright. This text became the 1966 third edition. Tolkien took the opportunity to align the narrative more closely to The Lord of the Rings and to cosmological developments from his still unpublished Quenta Silmarillion as it stood at that time. These were mostly small edits; for example, changing the phrase "elves that are now called Gnomes" from the first, and second editions, on page 63, to "High Elves of the West, my kin" in the third edition. Tolkien had used "gnome" in his earlier writing to refer to the second kindred of the High Elves—the Noldor (or "Deep Elves")—thinking that "gnome", derived from the Greek gnosis (knowledge), was a good name for the wisest of the elves. However, because of the term's association with garden gnomes, Tolkien abandoned the term. This edition also introduced a new version of the history of Erebor. In the original story, Erebor was founded by Thorin's grandfather Thror, and the Arkenstone discovered by his father Thrain. However, to correct a note on the map saying that Thrain had been King Under the Mountain, Tolkien introduced a distant ancestor Thrain I in the third edition text, who both founded the kingdom and discovered the Arkenstone.

=== Posthumous critical editions ===
Since Tolkien's death, two critical editions of The Hobbit have been published, providing commentary on the creation, emendation and development of the text. In his 1988 The Annotated Hobbit, Douglas Anderson provides the text of the published book alongside commentary and illustrations. Later editions added the text of "The Quest of Erebor". Anderson's commentary makes note of the sources Tolkien brought together in preparing the text, and chronicles the changes Tolkien made to the published editions. The text is accompanied by illustrations from foreign language editions, among them works by Tove Jansson.

With The History of The Hobbit, published in two parts in 2007, John D. Rateliff provides the full text of the earliest and intermediary drafts of the book, alongside commentary that shows relationships to Tolkien's scholarly and creative works, both contemporary and later. In addition, Rateliff provides the abandoned 1960s retelling of the first three chapters, which sought to harmonise The Hobbit with The Lord of the Rings, and previously unpublished illustrations by Tolkien. The book separates commentary from Tolkien's text, allowing the reader to read the original drafts as self-contained stories.

=== Commercial success and collectors' market ===
While reliable figures are difficult to obtain, estimated global sales of The Hobbit run between 35 and 100 million copies since 1937. This makes it one of the best-selling books of all time. In the UK, The Hobbit has not retreated from the top 5,000 bestselling books measured by Nielsen BookScan since 1998, when the index began, achieving a three-year sales peak rising from 33,084 (2000) to 142,541 (2001), 126,771 (2002) and 61,229 (2003), ranking it at the 3rd position in Nielsen's "Evergreen" book list. The enduring popularity of The Hobbit makes early printings of the book attractive collector's items. The first printing of the first English-language edition can sell for between £6,000 and £20,000 at auction, while the price for a signed first edition has reached over £60,000.

== Legacy ==
=== The Lord of the Rings ===
The Hobbit's sequel The Lord of the Rings is often claimed to be its greatest legacy. The plots share the same basic structure in the same sequence: the stories are both quests starting at Bag End, the home of Bilbo Baggins; Bilbo hosts a party that sets the novel's main plot into motion; Gandalf sends the protagonist into a quest eastward; Elrond offers a haven and advice; the adventurers escape dangerous creatures underground (Goblin Town/Moria); they engage another group of elves (Mirkwood/Lothlórien); they traverse a desolate region (Desolation of Smaug/the Dead Marshes); they are received and nourished by a small settlement of men (Esgaroth/Ithilien); they fight in a massive battle (The Battle of Five Armies/Battle of Pelennor Fields); their journey climaxes within an infamous mountain peak (Lonely Mountain/Mount Doom); a descendant of kings is restored to his ancestral throne (Bard/Aragorn); and the questing party returns home to find it in a deteriorated condition (having possessions auctioned off/the Scouring of the Shire). Scholars including Paul H. Kocher and Randel Helms have documented the similarities.

Randel Helms's analysis of quest structure in The Hobbit and The Lord of the Rings
Event	The Hobbit	The Lord of the Rings
Start	From Bag End in the Shire	
End of 1st phase	Trip down River Running, nearing Erebor	Trip down River Anduin, nearing Mordor
Approaching the goal	Cross the dragon's withered heath	Cross the evil polluted plain of Gorgoroth
Achieving the quest	Enter hole in side of the Lonely Mountain	Enter hole in side of Mount Doom
Success marked by	Arrival of Great Eagles	
Returning home	Have to stop auction of Bag End	Have to scour the Shire of Sharkey's evil

The Lord of the Rings contains several more supporting scenes, and has a more sophisticated plot structure, following the paths of multiple characters. Tolkien wrote the later story in much less humorous tones and infused it with more complex moral and philosophical themes. The differences between the two stories can cause difficulties when readers, expecting them to be similar, find that they are not. Many of the thematic and stylistic differences arose because Tolkien wrote The Hobbit as a story for children, and The Lord of the Rings for the same audience, who had subsequently grown up since its publication. Further, Tolkien's concept of Middle-earth was to continually change and slowly evolve throughout his life and writings.

=== In education ===
The style and themes of the book have been seen to help stretch young readers' literacy skills, preparing them to approach the works of Charles Dickens and William Shakespeare. Further, it may exercise the reading skills of advanced younger readers better than much modern fiction for teenagers. Educationalists have seen The Hobbit as a means to encourage literacy among 11- to 14-year-old boys in particular.

=== Adaptations ===
The Hobbit has been adapted many times for a variety of media, starting with a March 1953 stage production by St. Margaret's School, Edinburgh. The first motion picture adaptation of The Hobbit was Gene Deitch's 1966 short film of cartoon stills. In 1968, BBC Radio 4 broadcast an 8-part radio drama version by Michael Kilgarriff. In 1974, Nicol Williamson recorded an abridged version of the book on 4 long-playing records for the Argo Records label, voicing all the characters. In 1977, Rankin/Bass made an animated film based on the book. In 1978, Romeo Muller won a Peabody Award for his teleplay, though critics described it as "execrable" and "confusing". A children's opera composed by Dean Burry appeared in 2004 in Toronto. Between 2012 and 2014, Peter Jackson's three-part live-action film version appeared on cinema screens. Several computer and video games have been based on the story, including a 1982 game by Beam Software. During the COVID-19 lockdown, Andy Serkis read the whole of The Hobbit to raise money for charity. He then recorded the work again as an audiobook, with cover art by Alan Lee.

== See also ==
- Middle-earth in film

== Sources ==
Primary

- Tolkien, J. R. R. (1937). The Hobbit (1st ed.). London: George Allen & Unwin.

––– (1951). The Hobbit (2nd ed.). London: George Allen & Unwin.
––– (1966). The Hobbit (3rd ed.). Boston: Houghton Mifflin. ISBN 978-0-395-07122-9.

- Carpenter, Humphrey, ed. (2023) [1981]. The Letters of J. R. R. Tolkien: Revised and Expanded Edition. New York: HarperCollins. ISBN 978-0-35-865298-4.
- Tolkien, J. R. R. (1988) [1937]. Anderson, Douglas A. (ed.). The Annotated Hobbit. Houghton Mifflin. ISBN 978-0-3954-7690-1.
- Tolkien, J. R. R. (2003) [1937]. Anderson, Douglas A. (ed.). The Annotated Hobbit. London: HarperCollins. ISBN 978-0-00-713727-5.

Secondary

- Carpenter, Humphrey (1977). J. R. R. Tolkien: A Biography. New York: Ballantine Books. ISBN 978-0-04-928037-3.
- Chance, Jane (2001). Tolkien's Art. University of Kentucky Press. ISBN 978-0-618-47885-9.
- Drout, Michael D. C., ed. (2007). The J. R. R. Tolkien Encyclopedia: Scholarship and Critical Assessment. Routledge. ISBN 978-0-4159-6942-0.
- Grenby, Matthew (2008). Children's Literature. Edinburgh University Press. ISBN 978-0-618-47885-9.
- Hammond, Wayne G.; Anderson, Douglas A. (1993). J. R. R. Tolkien: A Descriptive Bibliography. New Castle, DE: Oak Knoll Books. ISBN 0-938768-42-5.
- Lobdell, Jared C. (2004). The World of the Rings: Language, Religion, and Adventure in Tolkien. Open Court. ISBN 978-0-8126-9569-4.
- Rateliff, John D. (2007). The History of the Hobbit. London: HarperCollins. ISBN 978-0-00-723555-1.
- Solopova, Elizabeth (2009). Languages, Myths and History: An Introduction to the Linguistic and Literary Background of J. R. R. Tolkien's Fiction. New York City: North Landing Books. ISBN 978-0-9816607-1-4.
- St. Clair, Gloriana (2000). "Tolkien's Cauldron: Northern Literature and The Lord of the Rings". Carnegie Mellon University.
