= Tolkien's legendarium =

J. R. R. Tolkien's mythological writings

Navigable diagram of more or less inclusive definitions of "Tolkien's legendarium". Most of it is in Christopher Tolkien's 12-volume The History of Middle-earth published between 1983 and 1996, though that includes 4 volumes on The History of The Lord of the Rings, which stands alongside John D. Rateliff's The History of The Hobbit. The strictest definition is a selection of documents from the 12-volume set, the phases of Tolkien's Elven legends. Matthew Dickerson and Jonathan Evans use the term broadly to encompass all Tolkien's Middle-earth writings, including the published novels. The two time-travel novels were attempts to create a frame story for The Silmarillion.

Tolkien's legendarium is the body of J. R. R. Tolkien's mythopoeic writing, unpublished in his lifetime, that forms the background to his The Lord of the Rings, and which his son Christopher summarized in his compilation of The Silmarillion and documented in his 12-volume series The History of Middle-earth. The legendarium's origins reach back to 1914, when Tolkien began writing poems and story sketches, drawing maps, and inventing languages and names as a private project to create a mythology for England. The earliest story, "The Voyage of Earendel, the Evening Star", is from 1914; he revised and rewrote the legendarium stories for most of his adult life.

The Hobbit (1937), Tolkien's first published novel, was not originally part of the larger mythology but became linked to it. Both The Hobbit and The Lord of the Rings (1954 and 1955) are set in the Third Age of Middle-earth, while virtually all of his earlier writing had been set in the first two ages of the world. The Lord of the Rings occasionally alludes to figures and events from the legendarium to create an impression of depth, but such ancient tales are depicted as being remembered by few until the story makes them relevant.

After The Lord of the Rings, Tolkien returned to his older stories to bring them to publishable form, but never completed the task. Tolkien's son Christopher chose portions of his late father's vast collection of unpublished material and shaped them into The Silmarillion (1977), a semi-chronological and semi-complete narrative of the mythical world and its origins. The sales were sufficient to enable him to work on and publish many volumes of his father's legendarium stories and drafts; some were presented as completed tales, while others illustrated his father's complex creative process. Tolkien research, a continuing examination of Tolkien's works and supporting mythology, became a scholarly area of study soon after his death in 1973.

== Etymology ==
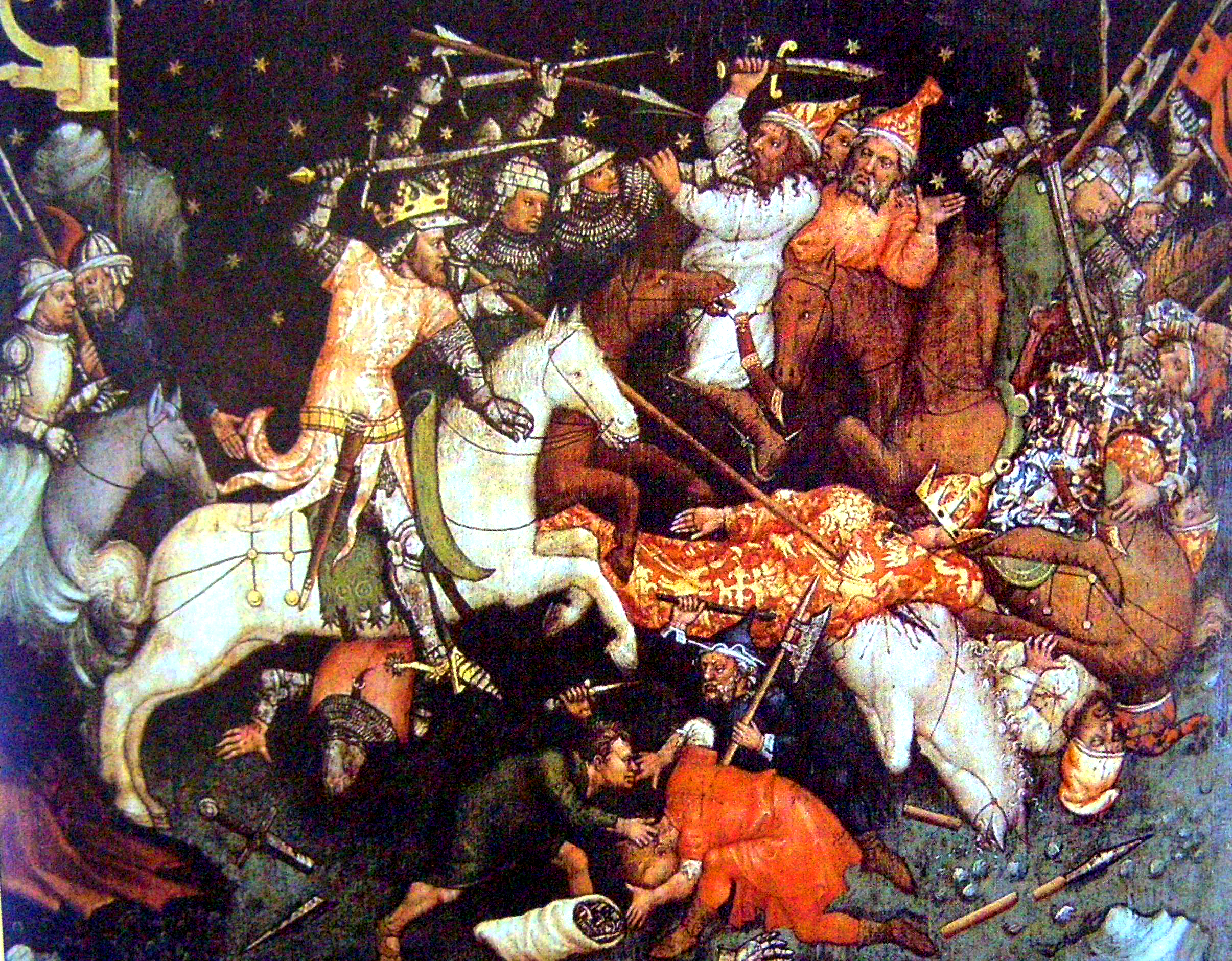
A battle scene from the 14th century Anjou Legendarium

A legendarium is a literary collection of legends. This medieval Latin noun originally referred mainly to texts detailing legends of the lives of saints. A surviving example is the Anjou Legendarium, dating from the 14th century. Quotations in the Oxford English Dictionary for the synonymous noun legendary date from 1513. The Middle English South English Legendary is an example of this form of the noun. (Note: Since legendary in contemporary English is mostly used as an adjective, the Latin form reduces ambiguity, but legendary as a noun remains in use in specialist (medievalist) vocabulary. Gilliver, Marshall & Weiner 2006, pp. 153–154)

== Documents included ==
=== Tolkien's usage ===
Tolkien described his works as a "legendarium" in four letters from 1951 to 1955, a period in which he was attempting to have his unfinished Silmarillion published alongside the more complete The Lord of the Rings. On the Silmarillion, he wrote in 1951, "This legendarium ends with a vision of the end of the world, its breaking and remaking, and the recovery of the Silmarilli and the 'light before the Sun'"; (Note: Carpenter 2023, #131 to Milton Waldman, written c. 1951) and in 1954, "Actually in the imagination of this story we are now living on a physically round Earth. But the whole 'legendarium' contains a transition from a flat world ... to a globe". (Note: Carpenter 2023, #154 to Naomi Mitchison, September 1954)

On both texts, he explained in 1954 that "... my legendarium, especially the 'Downfall of Númenor' which lies immediately behind The Lord of the Rings, is based on my view: that Men are essentially mortal and must not try to become 'immortal' in the flesh", (Note: Carpenter 2023, #153 to P. Hastings, September 1954) and in 1955, "But the beginning of the legendarium, of which the Trilogy is part (the conclusion), was an attempt to reorganise some of the Kalevala". (Note: Carpenter 2023, #163 to W. H. Auden, June 1955)

=== Rateliff's definition ===
"Tolkien's legendarium" is defined narrowly in John D. Rateliff's The History of The Hobbit as the body of Tolkien's work consisting of: (Note: Rateliff 2007, p. 900)

- The Book of Lost Tales
- The Sketch of the Mythology and contemporary alliterative verses
- The 1930 Quenta Noldorinwa and first Annals
- The 1937 Quenta Silmarillion and later Annals
- The later Quenta
- The final Annals

These, with The Lays of Beleriand, written from 1918 onwards, comprise the different "phases" of Tolkien's Elven legendary writings, posthumously edited and published in The Silmarillion and in their original forms in Christopher Tolkien's series The History of Middle-earth.

=== Scholarly usage ===
Other Tolkien scholars have used the term legendarium in a variety of contexts. Christopher Tolkien's introduction to The History of Middle-earth series talks about the "primary 'legendarium'", for the core episodes and themes of The Silmarillion which were not abandoned in his father's constant redrafting of the work. (Note: Tolkien 1984, Foreword: "it is certainly debatable whether it was wise to publish in 1977 a version of the primary 'legendarium' standing on its own and claiming, as it were, to be self-explanatory. The published work has no 'framework', no suggestion of what it is and how (within the imagined world) it came to be.")

The scholars Verlyn Flieger and Carl F. Hostetter edited a scholarly collection "Tolkien's Legendarium: Essays on The History of Middle-earth". Flieger writes that "...the greatest [event] is the creation of the Silmarils, the Gems of light that give their names to the whole legendarium", equating the legendarium with the Silmarillion (which with italics denotes the 1977 book published under that name, and without italics means the larger body of un-edited drafts used to create that work).

In the J. R. R. Tolkien Encyclopedia, David Bratman writes that "The History of Middle-earth is a longitudinal study of the development and elaboration of Tolkien's legendarium through his transcribed manuscripts, with textual commentary by the editor, Christopher Tolkien."

Dickerson and Evans use the phrase "legendarium" to encompass the entirety of Tolkien's Middle-earth writings "for convenience". This would encompass texts such as the incomplete drafts of stories published before The History of Middle-earth in the 1980 Unfinished Tales.

Shaun Gunner of The Tolkien Society has called the 2021 collection of Tolkien's previously unpublished legendarium writings The Nature of Middle-earth, edited by Carl F. Hostetter, "an unofficial 13th volume of The History of Middle-earth series".

== Development ==
=== A private mythology ===
Unlike "fictional universes" constructed for the purpose of writing and publishing popular fiction, Tolkien's legendarium for a long period was a private project, concerned with questions of philology, cosmology, theology and mythology. His biographer Humphrey Carpenter writes that although by 1923 Tolkien had almost completed The Book of Lost Tales, "it was almost as if he did not want to finish it", beginning instead to rewrite it; he suggests that Tolkien may have doubted if a publisher would take it, and notes that Tolkien was a perfectionist, and further that he was perhaps afraid of finishing as he wished to go on with his sub-creation, his invention of myth in Middle-earth.

Tolkien first began working on the stories that would become The Silmarillion in 1914. (Note: Carpenter 2023, #115 to K. Farrer, June 1948) His reading, in 1914, of the Old English manuscript Christ I led to Earendel and the first element of his legendarium, "The Voyage of Earendel, the Evening Star". He intended his stories to become a mythology that would explain the origins of English history and culture, (Note: Carpenter 2023, #131 to Milton Waldman, late 1951; #180 to Mr Thompson, January 1956) and to provide the necessary "historical" background for his invented Elvish languages. Much of this early work was written while Tolkien, then a British officer returned from France during World War I, was in hospital and on sick leave. (Note: Carpenter 2023, #165 to Houghton Mifflin, June 1955, #180 to Mr Thompson, January 1956, #282 to C. Kilby, December 1965) He completed "The Fall of Gondolin" in late 1916. (Note: Carpenter 2023, #163 to W. H. Auden, June 1955, 165 to Houghton Mifflin, June 1955)

He called his collection of nascent stories The Book of Lost Tales. (Note: Tolkien 1984, Foreword) This became the name for the first two volumes of The History of Middle-earth, which include these early texts. (Note: Tolkien 1984, ch. 1, "The Cottage of Lost Play") Tolkien never completed The Book of Lost Tales; he left it to compose the poems "The Lay of Leithian" (in 1925) and "The Lay of the Children of Húrin" (possibly as early as 1918).

The first complete version of The Silmarillion was the "Sketch of the Mythology" written in 1926 (Note: Tolkien 1985, Chapter I, "The Lay of the Children of Húrin") (later published in Volume IV of The History of Middle-earth). The "Sketch" was a 28-page synopsis written to explain the background of the story of Túrin to R. W. Reynolds, a friend to whom Tolkien had sent several of the stories. From the "Sketch" Tolkien developed a fuller narrative version of The Silmarillion called Quenta Noldorinwa (Note: Tolkien 1986, Preface) (also included in Volume IV). The Quenta Noldorinwa was the last version of The Silmarillion that Tolkien completed.

=== Ælfwine framing device ===
The stories in The Book of Lost Tales employ the narrative framing device of an Anglo-Saxon mariner named Ælfwine or Eriol or Ottor Wǽfre who finds the island of Tol Eressëa, where the Elves live, and the Elves tell him their history. He collects, translates from Old English, and writes the mythology that appears in The History of Middle-earth. (Note: Tolkien 1984, p. 103) Ælfwine means "Elf-friend" in Old English; men whose names have the same meaning, such as Alboin, Alwin, and Elendil, were to appear in the two unfinished time travel novels, The Lost Road in 1936 and The Notion Club Papers in 1945, as the protagonists reappeared in each of several different times.

There is no such framework in the published version of The Silmarillion, but the Narn i Hîn Húrin is introduced with the note "Here begins that tale which Ǽlfwine made from the Húrinien." (Note: Tolkien 1994, p. 311) Tolkien never fully dropped the idea of multiple 'voices' who collected the stories over the millennia.

=== A context for The Hobbit and The Lord of the Rings ===
When Tolkien published The Hobbit in 1937 (which was itself not originally intended for publication, but as a story told privately to his children), (Note: Carpenter 2023, Letter #163 to W. H. Auden, June 1955) the narrative of the published text was loosely influenced by the legendarium as a context, but was not designed to be part of it. Carpenter comments that not until Tolkien began to write its sequel, The Lord of the Rings, did he realise the significance of hobbits in his mythology.

In 1937, encouraged by the success of The Hobbit, Tolkien submitted to his publisher George Allen & Unwin an incomplete but more fully developed version of The Silmarillion called Quenta Silmarillion. The reader rejected the work as being obscure and "too Celtic". (Note: Carpenter 2023, #19 to Allen & Unwin, December 1937) The publisher instead asked Tolkien to write a sequel to The Hobbit. Tolkien began to revise the Silmarillion, but soon turned to the sequel, which became The Lord of the Rings. (Note: Tolkien 1987, part 2, ch. 6 "Quenta Silmarillion")

Writing The Lord of the Rings during the 1940s, Tolkien was attempting to address the dilemma of creating a narrative consistent with a "sequel" of the published The Hobbit and a desire to present a more comprehensive view of its large unpublished background. He renewed work on the Silmarillion after completing The Lord of the Rings, (Note: Tolkien 1993, Foreword) and he greatly desired to publish the two works together. (Note: Carpenter 2023, #124 to Allen & Unwin, February 1950) When it became clear that would not be possible, Tolkien turned his full attention to preparing The Lord of the Rings for publication. (Note: Carpenter 2023, #133 to Allen & Unwin, June 1952) John D. Rateliff has analysed the complex relationship between The Hobbit and The Silmarillion, providing evidence that they were related from the start of The Hobbit's composition.

=== Towards publishable form ===
With the success of The Lord of the Rings, Tolkien in the late 1950s returned to the Silmarillion, planning to revise the material of his legendarium into a form "fit for publication", a task which kept him occupied until his death in 1973, without attaining a completed state. The legendarium has indeed been called "a jumble of overlapping and often competing stories, annals, and lexicons." Much of his later writing was however concerned more with the theological and philosophical underpinnings of the work, rather than with the narratives themselves. By this time, he had doubts about fundamental aspects of the work that went back to the earliest versions of the stories, and it seems that he felt the need to resolve these problems before he could produce the "final" version of The Silmarillion. During this time he wrote extensively on such topics as the nature of evil in Arda, the origin of Orcs, the customs of the Elves, the nature and means of Elvish rebirth, the "flat" world, and the story of the Sun and Moon. In any event, with one or two exceptions, he made little change to the narratives during the remaining years of his life.

=== A presented collection ===
Tolkien went to great lengths to present his work as a collection of documents "within the fictional world", including preparing facsimile pages from The Book of Mazarbul for The Lord of the Rings. (Note: Carpenter 2023, #141 to Allen & Unwin, 9 October 1953)

The scholar Verlyn Flieger writes that Tolkien thought of his legendarium as a presented collection, with a frame story that changed over the years, first with an Ælfwine-type character who translates the "Golden Book" of the sages Rumil or Pengoloð; later, having the Hobbit Bilbo Baggins collect the stories into the Red Book of Westmarch, translating mythological Elvish documents in Rivendell.

The scholar Gergely Nagy observes that Tolkien "thought of his works as texts within the fictional world" (his emphasis), and that the overlapping of different and sometimes contradictory accounts was central to his desired effect. Nagy notes that Tolkien went so far as to create facsimile pages from the Dwarves' Book of Mazarbul that is found by the Fellowship in Moria. Further, Tolkien was a philologist; Nagy comments that Tolkien may have been intentionally imitating the philological style of Elias Lönnrot, compiler of the Finnish epic, the Kalevala; or of St Jerome, Snorri Sturlusson, Jacob Grimm, or Nikolai Gruntvig, all of whom Tolkien saw as exemplars of a professional and creative philology. This was, Nagy believes, what Tolkien thought essential if he was to present a mythology for England, since such a thing had to have been written by many hands. Further, writes Nagy, Christopher Tolkien "inserted himself in the functional place of Bilbo" as editor and collator, in his view "reinforcing the mythopoeic effect" that his father had wanted to achieve, making the published book do what Bilbo's book was meant to do, and so unintentionally realising his father's intention.

Christopher Tolkien's editorial framing of The Monsters and the Critics, and Other Essays presents it as a set of scholarly texts.

Christopher Tolkien's editorial framing of the 12 volumes of The History of Middle-earth presents his father's legendarium, and the books derived from it, as a set of historic texts, analogous to the presentation of genuine scholarly works like The Monsters and The Critics; and it creates a narrative voice throughout the series, a figure of Christopher Tolkien himself.

== See also ==
- Middle-earth canon – the set of Tolkien's writings on Middle-earth
- J. R. R. Tolkien bibliography – list of all Tolkien's writings
- J. R. R. Tolkien's influences – influences on Tolkien's Middle-earth writing
- Tolkien's Legendarium: Essays on The History of Middle-earth – a 2000 collection of scholarly essays on the legendarium
