= John D. Rateliff =

Game author, Tolkien scholar

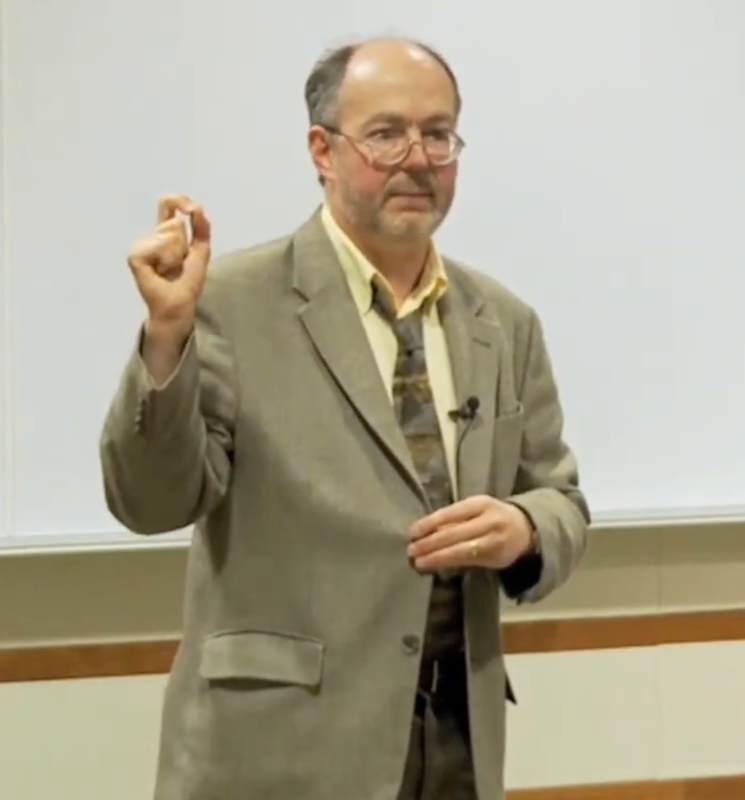
Rateliff delivering a speech at Marquette University in 2012

John D. Rateliff (born December 9, 1958) is an American independent scholar of fantasy literature and author of roleplaying games. He specializes in the study of the works of J. R. R. Tolkien, particularly his Middle-earth writings, and wrote and edited the 2007 book The History of the Hobbit.

== Early life ==
John D. Rateliff was raised in Magnolia, Arkansas. He moved to Wisconsin in 1981 to study Tolkien's manuscripts at Marquette University. Rateliff is an expert in Tolkien studies, and he earned a Ph.D in 20th-century British literature from Marquette.

== Career ==
Rateliff has helped organize several major conferences on Tolkien. He contributed essays to Tolkien's Legendarium: Essays on The History of Middle-earth (2000) and to a volume marking the fiftieth anniversary of the publication of The Lord of the Rings, and edited The History of The Hobbit, containing drafts of Tolkien's The Hobbit with extensive commentary. Having written his dissertation on Lord Dunsany, Rateliff likes to describe his degree as "a Ph.D in fantasy."

He worked for the game companies TSR, Wizards of the Coast, and Hasbro, contributing to a large number of Dungeons & Dragons products. In addition he worked as a freelancer for companies including Decipher Inc., Green Ronin, White Wolf, Guardians of Order, and Chaosium.

Rateliff was the co-editor of the third edition D&D Player's Handbook and Dungeon Master's Guide (the original d20 System game rules), and worked on such titles as Mark of Amber, Night Below, Return to the Tomb of Horrors, the Eberron core rulebook, and Decipher's Lord of the Rings Roleplaying Game. He is the author of the adventures The Standing Stone and Return to the Keep on the Borderlands, and co-editor of and contributor to d20 Cthulhu.

== Publications ==
=== Children's books ===
- Egypt (Children of the World) (with Valerie Weber and Julie Brown; Gareth Stevens Publishing) (1992)

=== Roleplaying ===
- Player's Survival Kit/Book, Adventurer's Log, and Cards Advanced Dungeons & Dragons, 2nd Edition (1995)
- Return to the Keep on the Borderlands Advanced Dungeons & Dragons (1999)
- Reverse Dungeon Advanced Dungeons & Dragons (2000)
- Hero Builder's Guidebook Dungeons & Dragons (co-author) (2000)
- The Standing Stone: An Adventure for 7th-Level Characters Dungeons & Dragons Adventure (2001)
- The Lord of the Rings Roleplaying Game Decipher (co-author) (2002)
- EverQuest Player's Handbook (2002)
- Fushigi Yûgi: Ultimate Fan Guide #1 (2002)

=== Doctoral thesis ===
- 'Beyond the fields we know' : the short stories of Lord Dunsany (1990)

=== Studies of works by the Inklings ===
- "Early Versions of Farmer Giles of Ham" in Leaves from the Tree: J. R. R. Tolkien's Shorter Fiction, The Tolkien Society (1991)
- "Rhetorical Strategies in Charles William's Prose Play" in The Rhetoric of Vision: Essays on Charles Williams edited by Charles A. Huttar and Peter J. Schakel (1996)
- "'The Lost Road', 'The Dark Tower', and 'The Notion Club Papers': Tolkien and Lewis's Time Travel Triad" in Tolkien's Legendarium: Essays on The History of Middle-earth edited by Verlyn Flieger and Carl F. Hostetter (2000)
- The History of The Hobbit (2007)
- Introduction to Eager Spring by Owen Barfield (2008)
