= Carl F. Hostetter =

Tolkien scholar and NASA scientist

Carl Franklin Hostetter is a Tolkien scholar and NASA computer scientist. He has edited and annotated many of J. R. R. Tolkien's linguistic writings, publishing them in Vinyar Tengwar and Parma Eldalamberon, and edited collections of Middle-earth writings by scholars and by Tolkien himself.

== Career ==
=== NASA ===
Carl Hostetter joined NASA as a computer scientist at its Goddard Space Flight Center in 1985. In the 1990s, he edited the proceedings of the Goddard Space Conference for some years.

=== Tolkien scholar ===
Hostetter is a Tolkien scholar and key figure in the Elvish Linguistic Fellowship. He has written numerous articles on the linguistics of J. R. R. Tolkien's Middle-earth. He ran the scholarly mailing list Lambengolmor from 2002 to its closure in 2020. He is the editor of the Tolkien linguistics journals Vinyar Tengwar and Tengwestië. By arrangement with Christopher Tolkien, he (with other Tolkien scholars) edited and published a large quantity of J. R. R. Tolkien's writings on his constructed languages in Vinyar Tengwar and in Parma Eldalamberon.

== Reception ==
John S. Ryan, reviewing the 2000 collection Tolkien's Legendarium: Essays on The History of Middle-earth (edited by Hostetter and Verlyn Flieger) for VII, called it a "luminous companion" to the 12 volumes of Christopher Tolkien's The History of Middle-earth, and "clearly indispensable". The book won the 2002 Mythopoeic Scholarship Award for Inklings Studies.

The Tolkien scholar Douglas C. Kane, while welcoming the 2021 book The Nature of Middle-earth, writes that Hostetter "appears to overstep his role as editor" by presenting the materials according to his personal point of view. In particular, Kane states that Hostetter wrongly applies Tolkien's remark that The Lord of the Rings was fundamentally religious and Catholic to the whole of the legendarium. Kane calls this contrary to Christopher Tolkien's editorial practice, and "a blatant statement of intent". Kane quotes Verlyn Flieger's remark that Tolkien's work reflects the two sides of his nature; the work can be seen both "as Catholic [and] not Christian."

== Books edited ==
=== Middle-earth ===
- 2000 Tolkien's Legendarium: Essays on The History of Middle-earth (with Verlyn Flieger) Westport: Greenwood Press
- 2003 Early Quenya Fragments / Early Quenya Grammar (with Bill Welden) Cupertino: The Tolkien Trust
- 2005 The Collected Vinyar Tengwar (with Jorge Quiñonez) Crofton: Elvish Linguistic Fellowship
- 2021 The Nature of Middle-earth: late writings on the lands, inhabitants, and metaphysics of Middle-earth (texts by J.R.R. Tolkien) Boston: Houghton Mifflin Harcourt

=== Space science ===
- 1993 Space applications of artificial intelligence: Goddard Conference. Goddard Space Flight Center, NASA
- 1994 Space applications of artificial intelligence: Goddard Conference. Goddard Space Flight Center, NASA
- 1995 Space applications of artificial intelligence: Goddard Conference. Goddard Space Flight Center, NASA
