= Douglas A. Anderson =

American writer and editor

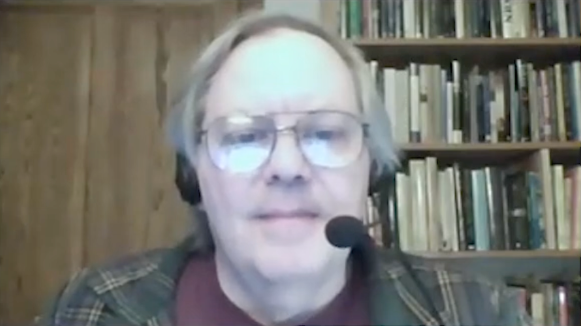
- Anderson in 2021
- Born: Douglas Allen Anderson; December 30, 1959 (age 66); Valparaiso, Indiana, U.S.
- Occupation: American writer

Douglas Allen Anderson (born December 30, 1959) is an American writer and editor on the subjects of fantasy and medieval literature, specializing in textual analysis of the works of J. R. R. Tolkien. His 1988 edition of Tolkien's children's book The Hobbit, The Annotated Hobbit, won him a Mythopoeic Award for scholarship.

== Biography ==
Douglas Anderson was born in Valparaiso, Indiana, United States. After becoming friends with him in Oxford in 1978, he assisted Humphrey Carpenter with work on the latter's biography of Auden, and with The Letters of J. R. R. Tolkien.

His first published book was The Annotated Hobbit (1988), which grew out of a study of J. R. R. Tolkien's revisions to the various editions of The Hobbit following the publication of The Lord of the Rings. The book consisted of Anderson's detailed explanations alongside Tolkien's text. A revised and illustrated edition was published in 2002.

Anderson's textual studies of The Lord of the Rings are the core of the Houghton Mifflin revised American edition of 1987, incorporating various changes made to British editions at Tolkien's direction. He contributed a "Note on the Text" discussing the history of these changes, which was subsequently incorporated into later editions with various minor revisions.

With Verlyn Flieger and Michael D. C. Drout, he is a founding editor of Tolkien Studies: An Annual Scholarly Review; the first volume appeared in 2004.

Anderson has edited modern editions of works by fantasy authors including Leonard Cline, Kenneth Morris, Evangeline Walton and William Hope Hodgson. He is a visiting lecturer at Signum University. Aside from his editing and Tolkien studies, he is a bookseller, having worked first in Ithaca, New York, and then in Indiana. He runs the publishing business Nodens Books, which seeks to revive the work of forgotten authors.

== Awards and distinctions ==
The Annotated Hobbit won the 1990 Mythopoeic Award for scholarship.

== Books ==
Written

- J.R.R. Tolkien: A Descriptive Bibliography (Winchester Bibliographies of 20th Century Writers) (with Wayne G. Hammond), St. Paul's Bibliographies, 1993
- Tales Before Tolkien: The Roots of Modern Fantasy, Ballantine Books, 2003
- J.R.R. Tolkien: Interviews, Reminiscences, and Other Essays, Houghton Mifflin, 2007 ISBN 978-0-618-44516-5
- Tales Before Narnia: The Roots of Modern Fantasy and Science Fiction, Del Ray, 2008, ISBN 978-0-345-49890-8

Edited

- The Annotated Hobbit, Houghton Mifflin, 1988, revised 2002
- The Chalchiuhite Dragon by Kenneth Morris, Tom Doherty Associates, 1992
- The Lady of Frozen Death and Other Weird Tales by Leonard Cline, Necronomicon Press, 1992
- The Dragon Path: Collected Tales of Kenneth Morris, TOR, 1995
- The Marvellous Land of Snergs by E. A. Wyke-Smith, HarperCollins, 1995
- The Life of Sir Aglovale de Galis, Theclassics Us, 2000
- Eyes of the God: The Weird Fiction and Poetry of R. H. Barlow, Hippocampus Press, 2002
- Book of The Three Dragons by Kenneth Morris, Cold Spring Press, 2004
- Tolkien Studies: An Annual Scholarly Review, Volume 1, 2004 (co-editor), West Virginia University Press, ISBN 0-937058-87-4
- H.P. Lovecraft's Favorite Weird Tales: The Roots of Modern Horror, Cold Spring Press, 2005
- Adrift on The Haunted Seas: The Best Short Stories of William Hope Hodgson, 2005
- Tolkien Studies: An Annual Scholarly Review, Volume 2, 2005 (co-editor), West Virginia University Press, ISBN 1-933202-03-3
- The Dark Chamber by Leonard Cline, Cold Spring Press, 2005
- Seekers of Dreams: Masterpieces of Fantasy, Simon & Schuster, 2005
- Tolkien Studies: An Annual Scholarly Review, Volume 3, 2006 (co-editor), West Virginia University Press, ISBN 1-933202-10-6
- Tolkien Studies: An Annual Scholarly Review, Volume 4, 2007 (co-editor), West Virginia University Press, ISBN 1-933202-26-2

== Sources ==
- Anderson, Douglas A (editor): The Annotated Hobbit (revised edition), 2002, ISBN 0-618-13470-0
- Mythprint, June 1999
