= Anachronism in Middle-earth =

Theme in Tolkien's fantasy writings

Tolkien's drawing The Hall at Bag-End, Residence of B. Baggins Esquire shows modern fittings, a clock and a barometer. The image of a comfortable home is far out of keeping with the medieval world of Elves, Dwarves, and heroes.

Anachronism, chronological inconsistency, is seen in J. R. R. Tolkien's fantasy world of Middle-earth in the juxtaposition of cultures of evidently different periods, such as the classically inspired Gondor and the medieval-style Rohan, and in the far more modern hobbits of the Shire, a setting which resembles the English countryside of Tolkien's childhood. The more familiar lifestyle and manner of the hobbits, complete with tobacco, potatoes, umbrellas, and mantelpiece clocks, allows them to mediate between the reader and the far older cultures of Middle-earth. They were introduced for The Hobbit, a children's story not planned to be set in Middle-earth; their anachronistic role is extended in The Lord of the Rings.

Tolkien's books are at once medieval in style and modern in many ways, such as appealing to a diverse modern readership and possessing a modern novelistic "realism". The One Ring, too, embodies a strikingly modern concept, that power corrupts; in medieval thought, power just revealed how a person already was. The combination of medieval and modern is echoed in Peter Jackson's films of The Lord of the Rings, introducing further anachronistic elements such as skateboarding during a battle scene.

== Cultures of different periods ==
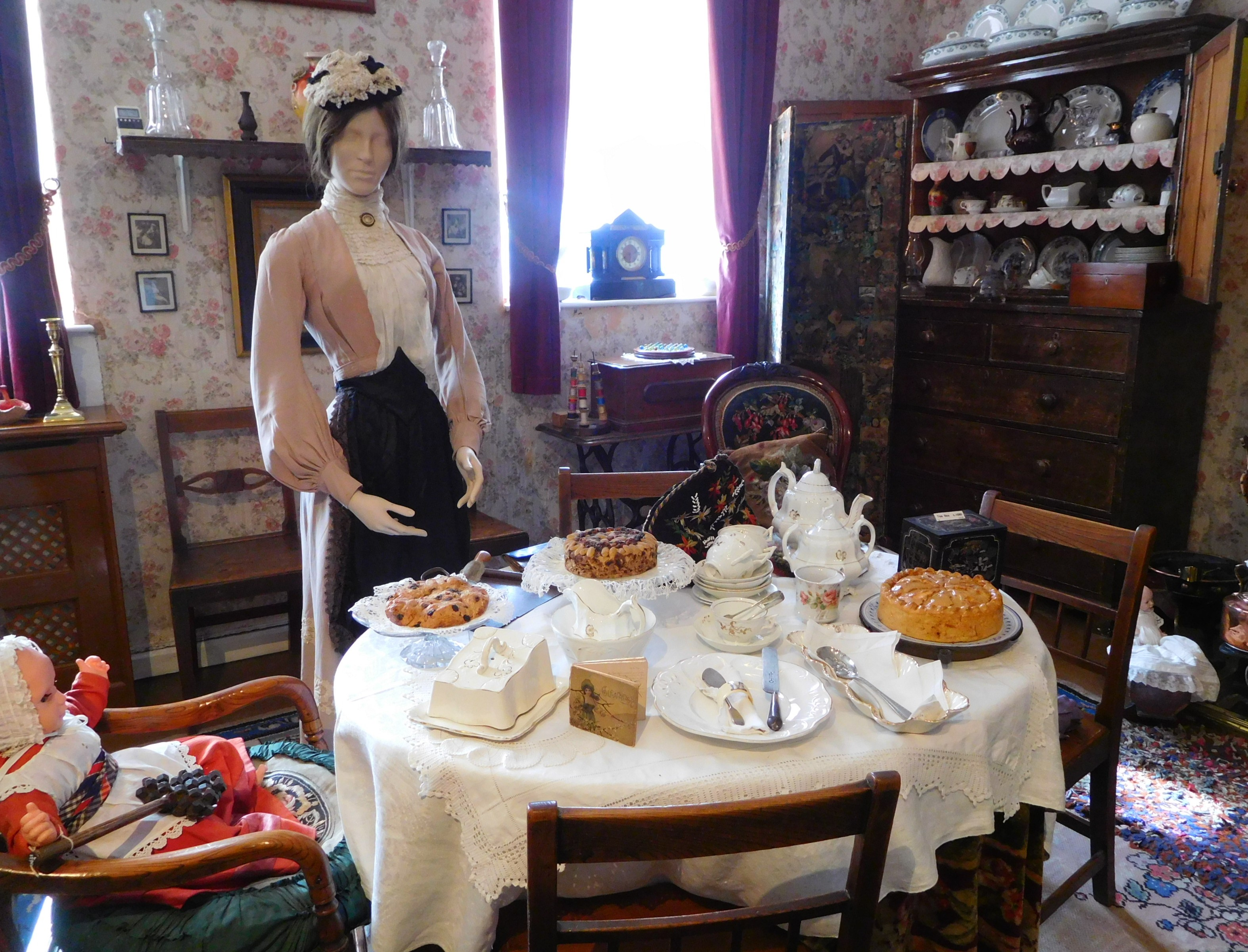
"It was a hobbit-hole, and that means comfort": Bag End, with its parlours and pantries, resembled a Victorian era home. Victorian parlour at Nidderdale Museum pictured.

Scholars have commented that the cultures of Middle-earth, such as the classically inspired Gondor and the medieval-style Rohan, are evidently of different eras, creating a built-in element of anachronism in the narrative. Those heroic cultures are, in turn, clearly quite unlike that of the home-loving hobbits of the Shire. Gondor is rooted in ancient Rome, while Rohan echoes many aspects of the culture of the Anglo-Saxons. The Tolkien scholar Sandra Ballif Straubhaar writes that "the most striking similarities" for Gondor are with the legends of ancient Rome: Aeneas, from Troy, and Elendil, from Númenor, both survive the destruction of their home countries; the brothers Romulus and Remus found Rome, while the brothers Isildur and Anárion found the Númenórean kingdoms in Middle-earth; and both Gondor and Rome experienced centuries of "decadence and decline".

Bilbo Baggins's comfortable home in The Hobbit, on the other hand, is in Tom Shippey's words

in everything except being underground (and in there being no servants), the home of a member of the Victorian upper-middle class of Tolkien's nineteenth-century youth, full of studies, parlours, cellars, pantries, wardrobes, and all the rest... hobbits are, and always remain, highly anachronistic [italics in original] in the ancient world of Middle-earth.

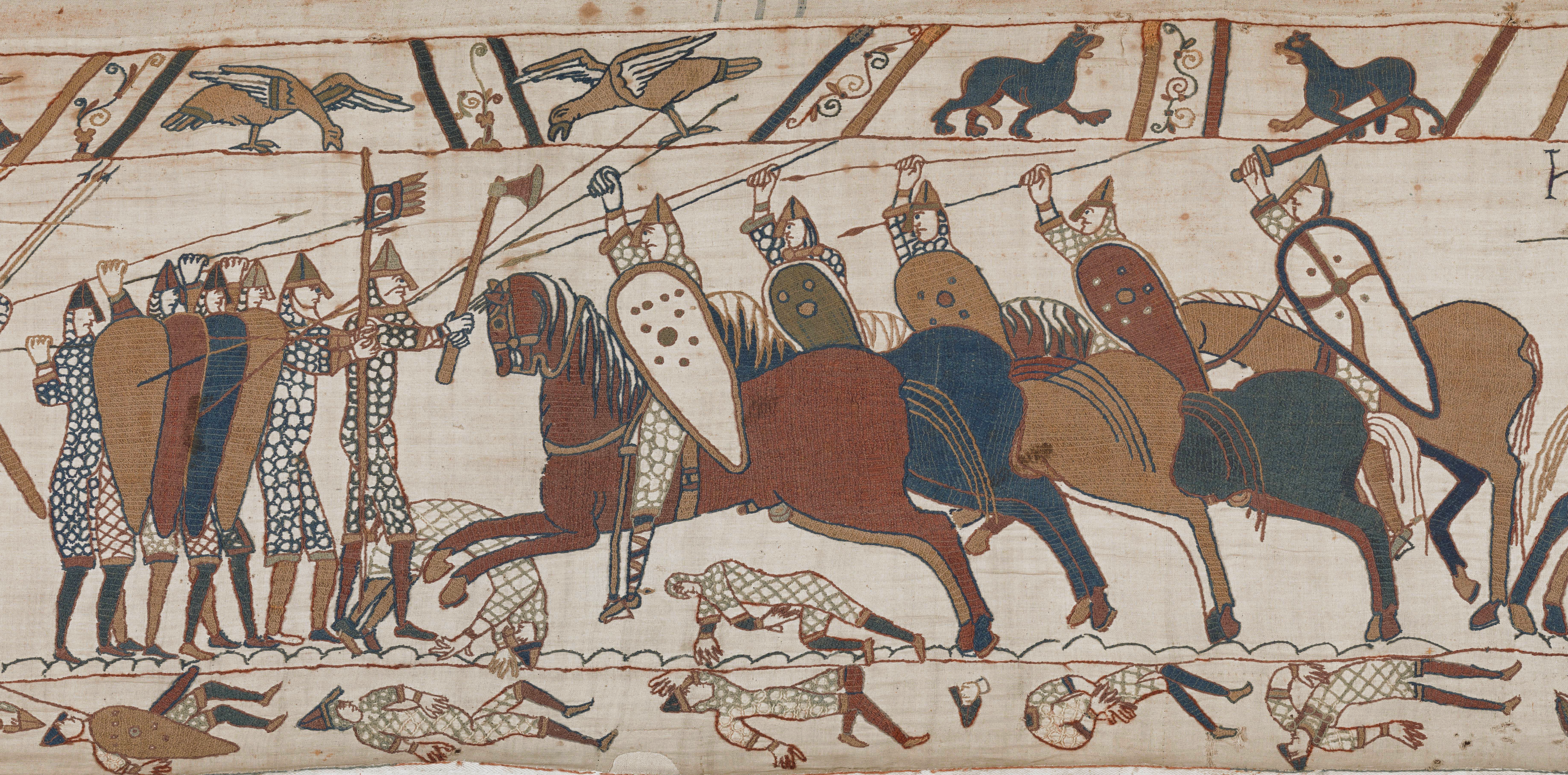
Tolkien stated that the styles of the medieval Bayeux Tapestry, showing horsemen fighting with spears and swords, and armoured with mail shirts and iron helmets, fitted the Rohirrim "well enough". (Note: Carpenter 2023, No. 211 to Rhona Beare, 14 October 1958)

Middle-earth cultures matching different real-world eras
Culture	Period	Dates	Notes
Gondor	Classical antiquity	800 BC–500 AD	Parallels with Ancient Rome include origin-figures who survive wreck of their home countries; brother founders; and centuries of decline and decadence.
Gondor	Middle Ages	500–1500 AD	Parallels with Byzantine Empire (until 1453) include an older state, a weaker sister kingdom, enemies to East and South, and final siege from the East.
Rohan	Middle Ages	500–1500 AD	Tolkien stated that the equipment shown in the Bayeux Tapestry, for the 1066 Battle of Hastings, would suit the Rohirrim "well enough".
The Shire	Victorian era	1837–1901	Tolkien dated the Shire to the Diamond Jubilee, 1897

== Modern hobbits in an older world ==
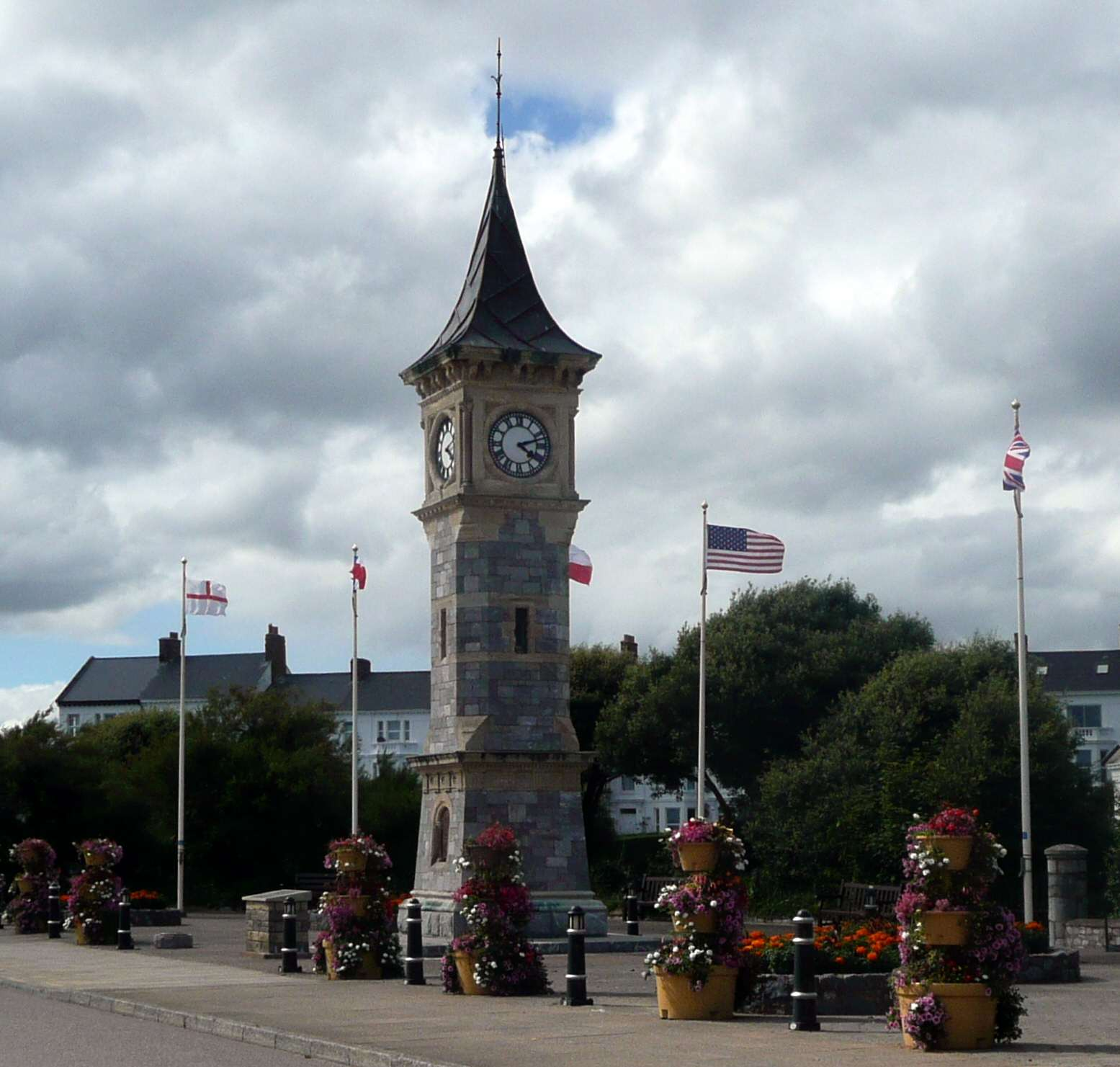
Tolkien dated the Shire to the time of the Diamond Jubilee of Queen Victoria, 1897, when Exmouth's Jubilee clock was built. (Note: Carpenter 2023, #178 to Allen & Unwin, 12 December 1955)

Tolkien scholars including Shippey and Dimitra Fimi have stated that the hobbits are misfits in Middle-earth's heroic world. Tolkien placed the Shire not somewhere heroic, but in a society he had personally experienced, "more or less a Warwickshire village of about the period of the Diamond Jubilee [of Queen Victoria, in 1897]". Shippey described the hobbits' culture, complete with tobacco and potatoes, as a "creative anachronism" on Tolkien's part. In his view, anachronism is the "essential function" of hobbits, enabling Tolkien to "bridge the gap" by mediating between readers' lives in the modern world and the dangerous ancient world of Middle-earth. Robert Tally notes that Bilbo is the anachronism in The Hobbit as he enters the otherwise consistently "distant, legendary, or mythic past", meeting the wizard Gandalf, the Dwarf Thorin, Elves, and the dragon. This mediating function was, back in 1957, said to be essential by Douglass Parker in his review of The Lord of the Rings, Hwaet We Holbytla....

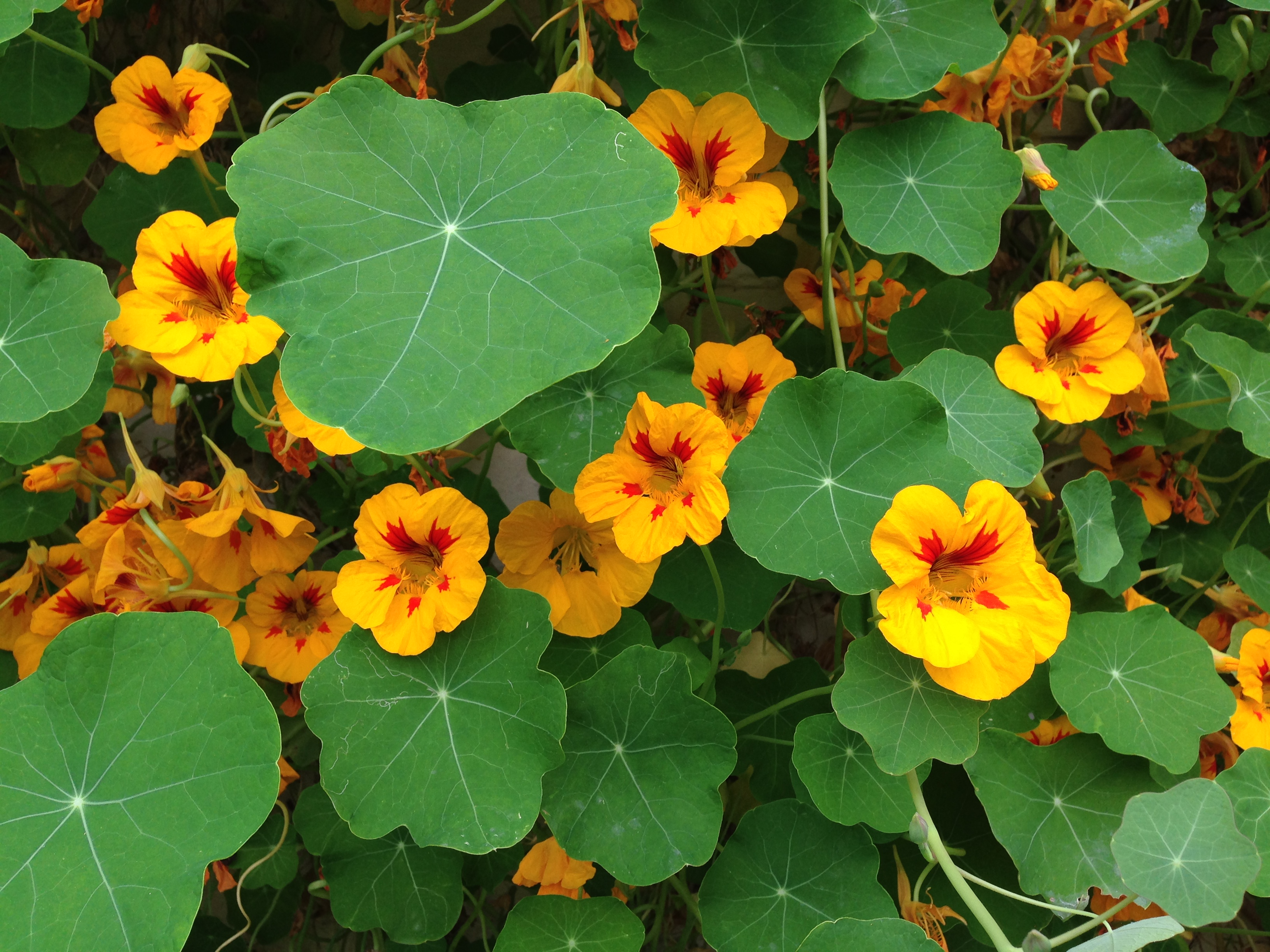
The "nasturtians" growing at Bag End were imported to England in the 18th century.

Fimi comments that this applies both to the style of language used by the hobbits, and to their material culture of "umbrellas, camping kettles, matches, clocks, pocket handkerchiefs and fireworks", all of which are plainly modern, as are the fish and chips that Sam Gamgee thinks of on his journey to Mordor. (Note: Tolkien 1954, Book 4, ch. 4 "Of Herbs and Stewed Rabbit") Most striking, in her view, however, is Tolkien's description of the enormous dragon firework at Bilbo's party which rushed overhead "like an express train". Tolkien's drawing of the hall of Bilbo's home, Bag End, shows both a clock and a barometer (mentioned in an early draft), and he had another clock on his mantelpiece. (Note: Tolkien 1937, Chapter 2. Roast Mutton. "If you had dusted the mantelpiece you would have found this just under the clock,' said Gandalf, handing Bilbo a note" [from Thorin].) (Note: Tolkien, J. R. R. Bilbo's last Song: (for "XIV. Return to Hobbiton" note 21) "the Hornblower who received the barometer now changes from Cosimo (by way of Carambo) to Colombo." (A Long-expected Party): "For Cosimo Chubb, treat it as your own, Bingo: on the barometer. Cosimo used to bang it with a large fat finger whenever he came to call. He was afraid of getting wet, and wore a scarf and macintosh all the year round.") To arrange a party, the hobbits rely on a daily postal service. The effect, the scholars agree, is to bring the reader comfortably into the ancient heroic world.

The medievalist Lynn Forest-Hill writes that the plants mentioned are similarly anachronistic, whether the "nasturtians" growing over Bag End, the "taters" in its garden, or the "pipeweed" that the hobbits liked to smoke, each plant indicating a homely activity – gardening, cooking, smoking. In her view, the nasturtians "signal the specific relationship of [the] anachronistic [hobbits] to the present". Characters, too, can be anachronistic, out of their time, as with the hobbit-become-monster Gollum, who after his five centuries hidden under the Misty Mountains is in the time of the War of the Ring, the end of the Third Age, but who is from an era of the distant past when hobbits still lived by the River Anduin.

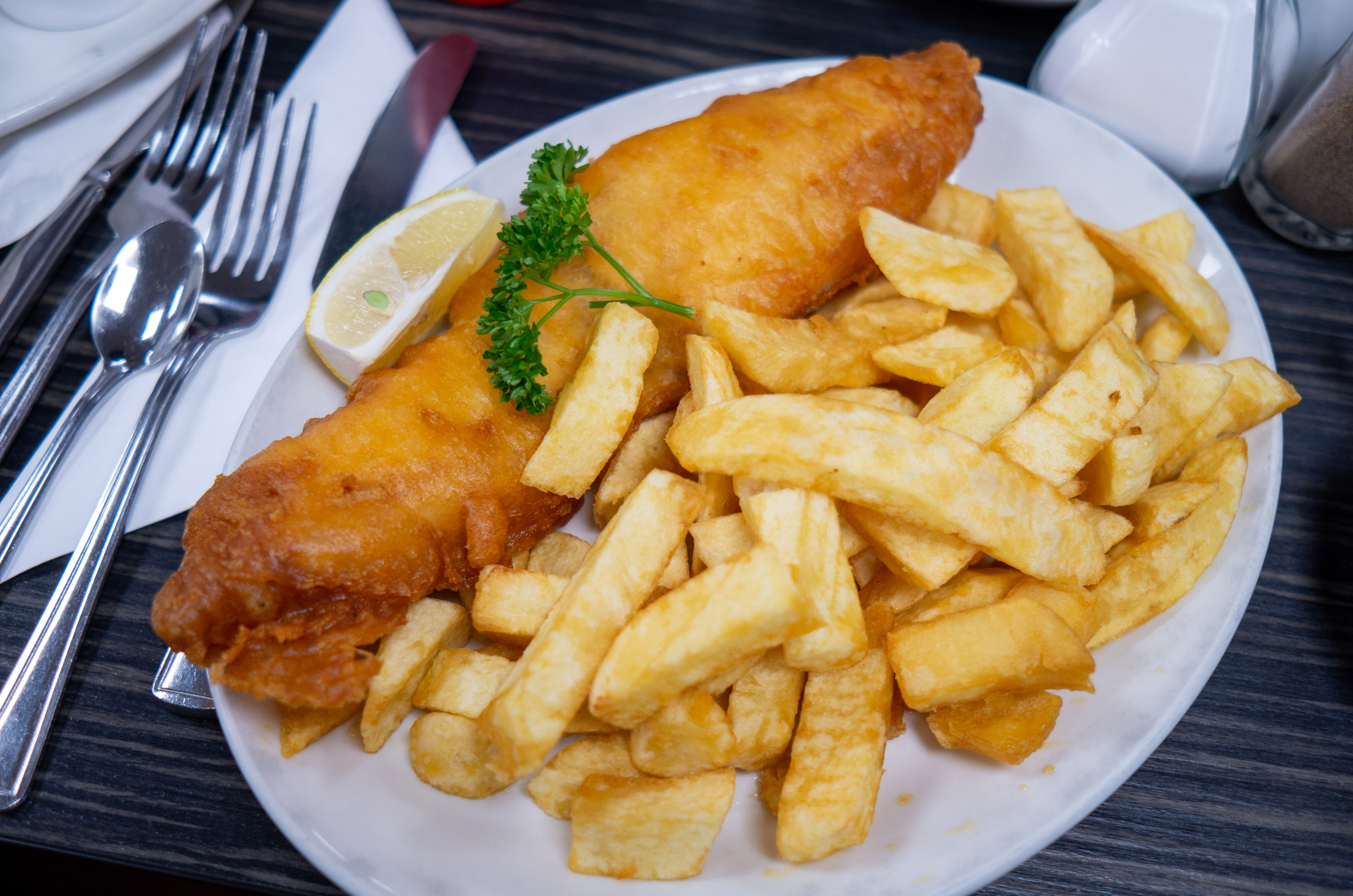
Sam Gamgee thinks of the modern dish of fish and chips (1860s shops in England) while journeying to Mordor.

The hobbits' "strikingly anachronistic" material culture
Object	First available	Notes
Tobacco	After 1492	Columbian exchange brought it to Europe
Potato	After 1492	As for tobacco
Nasturtium	18th century	Familiar but modern
Umbrella	18th century	Folding umbrellas, Paris
Camping kettle	After 1880s	Camping trips on River Thames; Kelly Kettle from end of 19th century
Safety match	1850s	Lundström brothers, Sweden
Clock	13th century	First clocks in church towers
Pocket handkerchief	19th century	In pocket of two-piece suit
Fireworks	10th century	Made in Europe by 14th century
Express train	19th century	"certainly unimaginable in Middle-earth"
Fish and chips	1860s	First fish and chip shops in England
Postal service	1840	Uniform Penny Post

== Medieval but modern ==
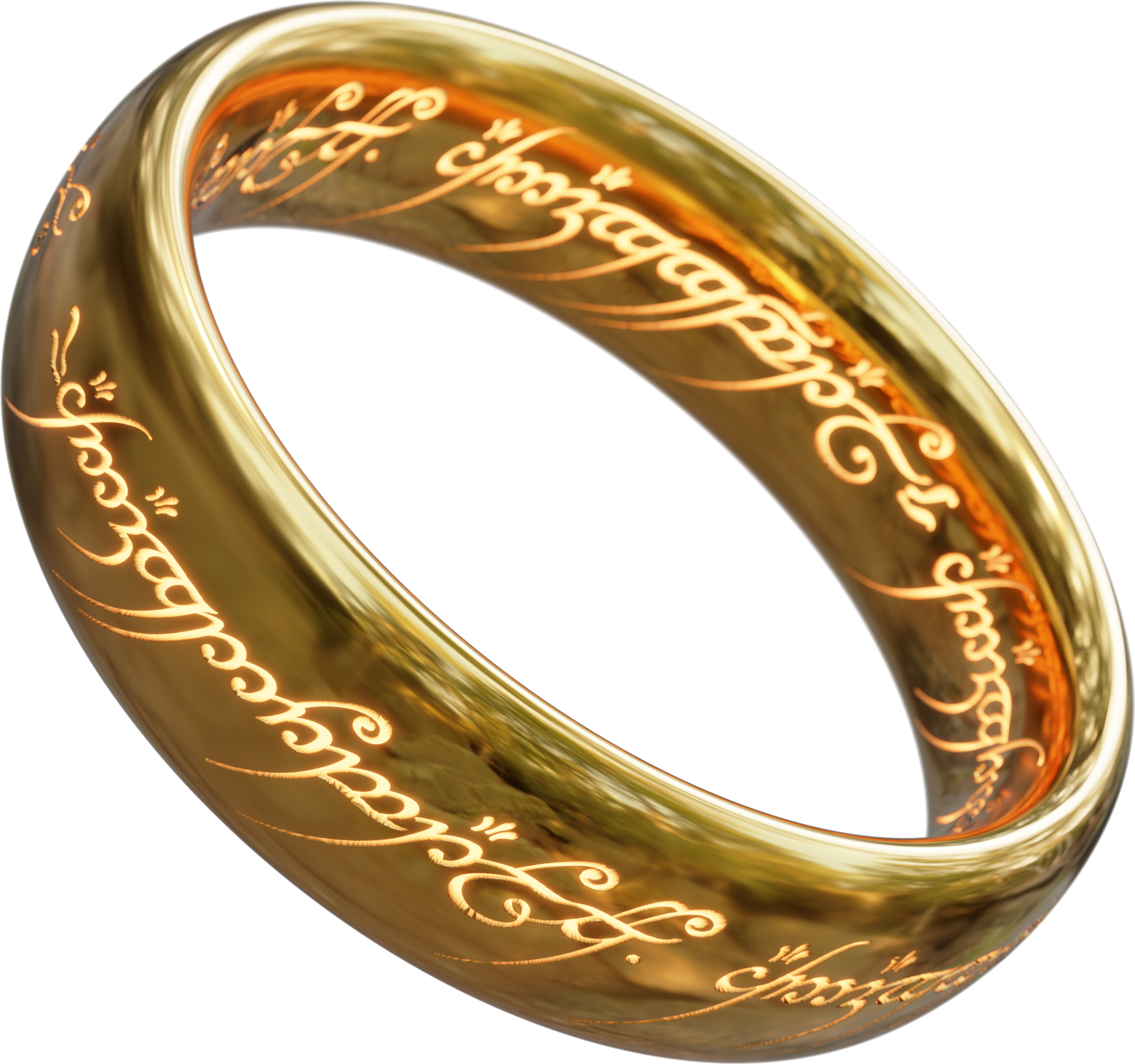
The Ring as a power which corrupts is Lord Acton's wholly modern conception, despite its medieval setting.

Scholars agree that while Middle-earth has a strongly Medieval feeling and setting, books like The Lord of the Rings are certainly modern. Tolkien, a philologist, was a professional medievalist; but his Middle-earth writings have attracted readers, in the words of Jane Chance and Alfred Siewers "globally across a wide political and cultural spectrum, from the postmodern counterculture to Christian traditionalists." The scholar of humanities Brian Rosebury comments that Tolkien's writing shares several qualities with modernism, as well as having a modern novelistic "realism". Anna Vaninskaya states that Tolkien was certainly "a modern writer"; he did not engage with modernism, but his work was "supremely intertextual", interweaving and juxtaposing styles, modes, and genres.

Shippey writes that a central aspect of The Lord of the Rings is strikingly non-medieval: the One Ring. Tolkien depicts it as relentlessly evil, eating away at its possessor's mind. Shippey comments that "The most evident fact to note about the Ring is that it is in conception strikingly anachronistic, totally modern". In his view, it embodies the modern maxim "Power corrupts, and absolute power corrupts absolutely", where in medieval thought, power just revealed how a person already was. The whole idea that power is corrosive and addictive is thus a modern one.

The illustrator Ted Nasmith describes his own Tolkien artwork as embodying "appropriate anachronism", presenting the apparently medieval in the idiom of modern fantasy.

== A literary process ==
Tolkien started writing The Hobbit purely as a children's story, nothing to do with his legendarium. By the time he had completed it, it alluded to Sauron (as the Necromancer) and mentioned Elrond, Esgaroth, and Gondolin: it was being drawn into Middle-earth. All the same, in 1937 when The Hobbit was published, Tolkien expected that that would be as far as the interconnections would go. However, a month later, his publisher, Stanley Unwin, let him know that the public would want "more from you about Hobbits!" Tolkien started work on a sequel, which became The Lord of the Rings, and it necessarily contained both heroic elements and hobbits. The story grew in the telling, and became a feigned history rather than a Silmarillion-like mythology, a fantasy complete with a sub-created secondary world, suitable for adults as well as children. Tolkien laboured to resolve the inconsistencies that the merger of The Hobbit and the mythology created, often successfully; but the anachronism of the hobbits in a more ancient world turned out to be both inherent in the story, and necessary to mediate between the characters of the ancient world and the reader.

== In adaptations ==
Peter Jackson's 2001–2003 film adaptation of The Lord of the Rings introduced further anachronistic elements. The scholar of literature Gwendolyn Morgan comments that Arwen is transformed into a "twenty-first century Buffy the Vampire Slayer", replacing Tolkien's "medieval courtly mistress", while the heroic Aragorn becomes an "angst-ridden, sensitive, existential '90s male", and Saruman's hatching of his Uruk Hai, a specially large breed of orcs, echoes modern concerns about genetic engineering. Then, she notes, there are the jokes about dwarf-tossing, and Legolas's skateboarding "down the stairs on a shield at Helm's Deep", this last becoming hugely popular, "evoking applause and verbal outbursts" in cinemas, things which Morgan suggests "may be more jarring".

== Sources ==
- Carpenter, Humphrey, ed. (2023) [1981]. The Letters of J. R. R. Tolkien: Revised and Expanded Edition. New York: Harper Collins. ISBN 978-0-35-865298-4.
- Chance, Jane; Siewers, Alfred (26 March 2008). Tolkien's Modern Middle Ages. New York: Palgrave Macmillan. ISBN 978-1-4039-6973-6.
- Fimi, Dimitra (2010) [2008]. Tolkien, Race, and Cultural History: From Fairies to Hobbits. Palgrave Macmillan. ISBN 978-0-230-21951-9. OCLC 222251097.
- Hammond, Wayne G.; Scull, Christina (1995). J. R. R. Tolkien: Artist and Illustrator. Illustrated by J. R. R. Tolkien. Boston: Houghton Mifflin. ISBN 0-395-74816-X.
- Lee, Stuart D., ed. (2020) [2014]. A Companion to J. R. R. Tolkien. Wiley Blackwell. ISBN 978-1119656029.
- Morgan, Gwendolyn A. (2007). "I Don't Think We're In Kansas Anymore: Peter Jackson's Film Interpretations of Tolkien's Lord of the Rings". In Keller, James R.; Stratyner, Leslie (eds.). Fantasy Fiction Into Film: Essays. McFarland. pp. 22–23. ISBN 9780786430574.
- Rosebury, Brian (2003) [1992]. Tolkien: A Cultural Phenomenon. Palgrave. ISBN 978-1403-91263-3.
- Shippey, Tom (2001). J.R.R. Tolkien: Author of the Century. HarperCollins. ISBN 978-0261-10401-3.
- Shippey, Tom (2005) [1982]. The Road to Middle-Earth: How J. R. R. Tolkien Created a New Mythology (Third ed.). HarperCollins. ISBN 978-0-261-10275-0.
- Straubhaar, Sandra Ballif (2007). "Gondor". In Drout, Michael D. C. (ed.). The J. R. R. Tolkien Encyclopedia: Scholarship and Critical Assessment. Routledge. pp. 248–249. ISBN 978-0-415-96942-0.
- Tolkien, J. R. R. (1937). Douglas A. Anderson (ed.). The Annotated Hobbit. Boston: Houghton Mifflin (published 2002). ISBN 978-0-618-13470-0.
- Tolkien, J. R. R. (1954). The Two Towers. The Lord of the Rings. Boston: Houghton Mifflin. OCLC 1042159111.
