= One Ring =

Magical ring in The Lord of the Rings

The One Ring
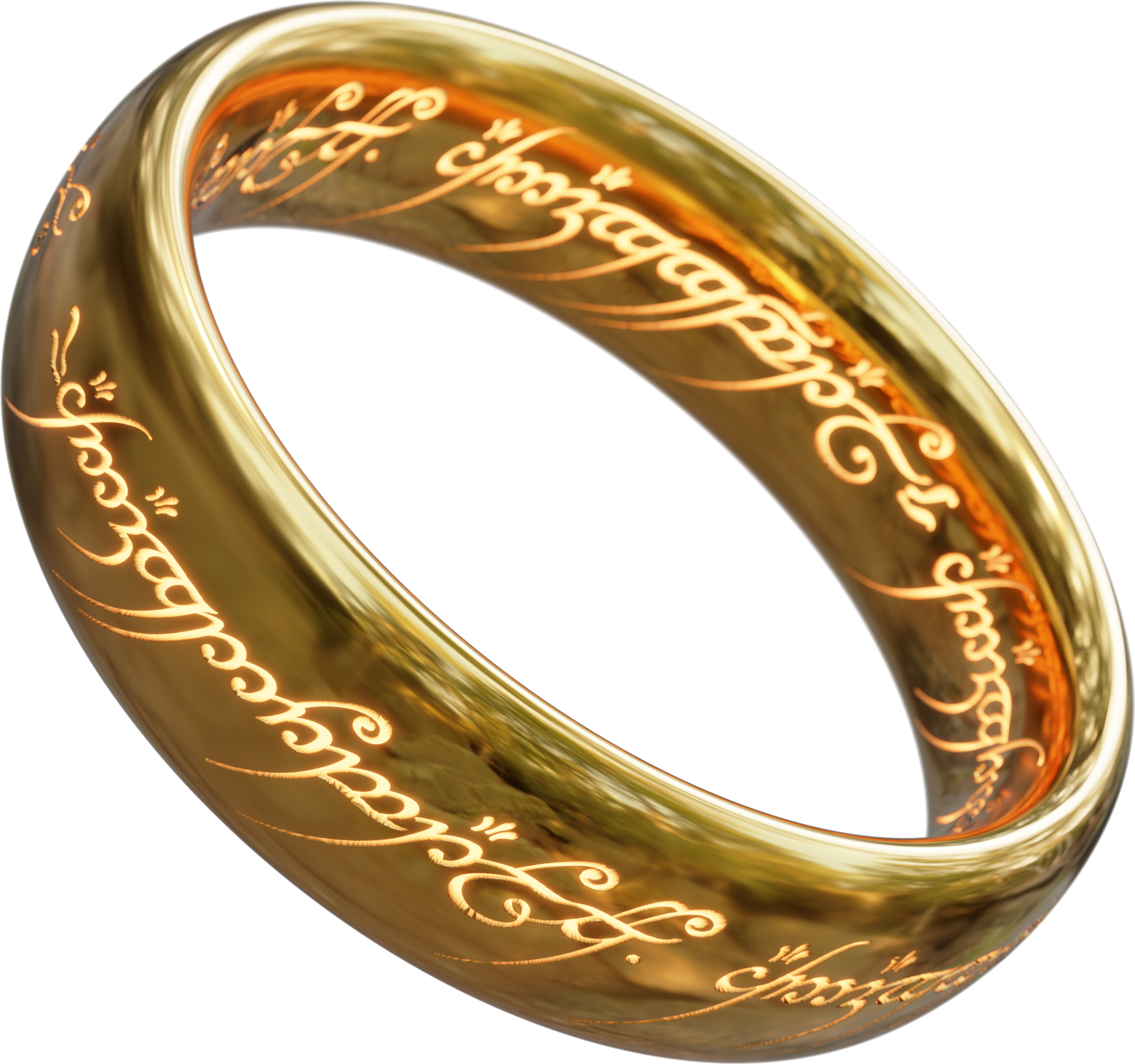
- Artist's representation
- First appearance: The Hobbit (1937)
- Created by: J. R. R. Tolkien
- Genre: Fantasy

In-universe information
- Type: Magical ring
- Owners: Sauron (creator)
- Function: Invisibility; Power augmentation; Will domination; Control over other Rings of Power made with Sauron's ring magic
- Traits and abilities: Plain gold ring; glowing inscription appears when ring is placed in flames; can change in size by its own will

The One Ring, also called the Ruling Ring, Isildur's Bane, or the Precious, is a central plot element in J. R. R. Tolkien's The Lord of the Rings (1954–55). It first appeared in the earlier story The Hobbit (1937) as a magic ring that grants the wearer invisibility. Tolkien changed it into a malevolent Ring of Power and rewrote parts of The Hobbit to fit in with the expanded narrative. The Lord of the Rings describes the hobbit Frodo Baggins's quest to destroy the Ring and save Middle-earth.

Scholars have compared the story with the ring-based plot of Richard Wagner's opera cycle Der Ring des Nibelungen; Tolkien denied any connection, but scholars state that at the least, both men certainly drew on the same mythology. Another source is Tolkien's analysis of Nodens, an obscure pagan god with a temple at Lydney Park, where he studied the Latin inscriptions, one containing a curse on the thief of a ring.

Tolkien rejected the idea that the story was an allegory, saying that applicability to situations such as the Second World War and the atomic bomb was a matter for readers. Other parallels have been drawn with the Ring of Gyges in Plato's Republic, which conferred invisibility, though there is no suggestion that Tolkien borrowed from the story.

== Fictional description ==
=== Purpose ===
In Middle-earth, the One Ring was forged by the Dark Lord Sauron during the Second Age to gain dominion over the free peoples of Middle-earth. In his disguise as Annatar, or the "Lord of Gifts", he aided the Elven smiths of Eregion and their leader Celebrimbor in the making of the Rings of Power. He then secretly forged the One Ring in the fires of Mount Doom. (Note: Tolkien 1954a, book 1, ch. 2 "The Shadow of the Past")

Sauron intended it to be the most powerful of all the Rings of Power, able to rule and control those who wore the others. Since the other Rings were powerful on their own, Sauron was forced to place much of his own power into the One Ring to achieve his purpose. (Note: Tolkien 1977, "Of the Rings of Power and the Third Age")

Creating the Ring simultaneously strengthened and weakened Sauron. With the Ring, he could control the power of all the other Rings, and thus he was significantly more powerful after its creation than before; (Note: Carpenter 2023, #131 to Milton Waldman, late 1951) but by binding his power within the Ring, Sauron became dependent on it to survive.

=== Appearance ===
The Ring seemed to be made simply of gold, but unlike other rings it was completely impervious to damage, even to dragon fire. It could be destroyed only by throwing it into the pit of the volcanic Mount Doom where it had been forged. Unlike the other Rings of Power, it bore no gem. It could change size, and could suddenly expand to escape from its wearer. When heated, it displayed a fiery inscription in Tengwar script that identified it as the One Ring. The inscription showed two lines in the Black Speech from the full Ring Verse: (Note: A drawing of the inscription and a translation provided by Gandalf appears in Tolkien 1954a, book 1, ch. 2 "The Shadow of the Past")

Black Speech written in Tengwar	Black Speech (Romanised)	English translation
	Ash nazg durbatulûk, ash nazg gimbatul, Ash nazg thrakatulûk agh burzum-ishi krimpatul.	One ring to rule them all, one ring to find them, One ring to bring them all and in the darkness bind them.

When Isildur cut the Ring from Sauron's hand, it was burning hot, so its inscription was legible. Isildur transcribed it before it faded. Gandalf learned of the secret inscription from his account, and heated Frodo's ring in a fire to reveal it, proving it to be the One Ring. Gandalf recited the inscription in Black Speech at the Council of Elrond, causing everyone to tremble: (Note: Tolkien 1954a, book 2, ch. 2, "The Council of Elrond")

The change in the wizard's voice was astounding. Suddenly it became menacing, powerful, harsh as stone. A shadow seemed to pass over the high sun, and the porch for a moment grew dark. All trembled, and the Elves stopped their ears.

=== Internal history ===
==== Second Age ====
After forging the ring, Sauron waged war on the Elves. He destroyed Eregion and killed Celebrimbor, the maker of the three Elf-rings. King Tar-Minastir of Númenor sent a great fleet to Middle-earth, and with this aid Gil-galad destroyed Sauron's army and forced Sauron to return to Mordor.

Later, Ar-Pharazôn, the last king of Númenor, landed at Umbar with an immense army, forcing Sauron's armies to flee. Sauron was taken to Númenor as a prisoner. (Note: Tolkien 1977, "Akallabêth") Tolkien wrote in a 1958 letter that the surrender was both "voluntary and cunning" so he could gain access to Númenor. (Note: Carpenter 2023, #211 to Rhona Beare, 14 October 1958) Sauron used the Númenóreans' fear of death to turn them against the Valar, and manipulate and deceive them into worshipping his former master, Morgoth (Sauron called him Melkor, Morgoth's original name), with human sacrifice.

Sauron's body was destroyed in the Fall of Númenor, but his spirit travelled back to Middle-earth and wielded the One Ring in renewed war against the Last Alliance of Elves and Men. Tolkien wrote, "I do not think one need boggle at this spirit carrying off the One Ring, upon which his power of dominating minds now largely depended."

Gil-galad and Elendil destroyed Sauron's physical form at the end of the Last Alliance, at the cost of their own lives. Elendil's son, Isildur, cut the Ring from Sauron's hand on the slopes of Mount Doom. Though counselled to destroy the Ring, he was swayed by its power and kept it "as weregild for my father, and my brother". Since the Ring had not been destroyed, Sauron's spirit remained alive, but he could not take physical form for the next 1000 years.

==== Third Age ====
A few years later, Isildur was ambushed by Orcs by the River Anduin near the Gladden Fields; he put on the Ring to escape, but it betrayed him by slipping from his finger as he swam, and, suddenly visible, he was killed by the Orcs. Since the Ring indirectly caused Isildur's death, it was known in Gondorian lore as "Isildur's Bane".

The Ring remained hidden on the river bed for almost two and a half millennia, until it was discovered on a fishing trip by a Stoor hobbit named Déagol. His friend and relative Sméagol, who had gone fishing with him, was immediately ensnared by the Ring's power and demanded that Déagol give it to him as a "birthday present"; when Déagol refused, Sméagol strangled him and took the Ring. It corrupted his body and mind, turning him into the monstrous Gollum. The Ring manipulated Gollum into hiding in a cave under the Misty Mountains near Mirkwood, where Sauron was beginning to resurface. There Gollum remained for nearly 500 years, using the Ring to hunt Orcs. The Ring eventually abandoned Gollum, knowing it would never leave the cave whilst he bore it. Bilbo Baggins found the ring while on his journey to the Lonely Mountain, and escaped from Gollum with it.

Gollum eventually left the Misty Mountains to track down the Ring. He was drawn to Mordor, where he was captured. Sauron tortured and interrogated him, learning that the Ring had been found and was held by one "Baggins" in the land of "Shire".

The Ring began to strain Bilbo, leaving him feeling "stretched-out and thin", so he decided to leave the Shire, intending to pass the Ring to his adopted heir Frodo Baggins. He briefly gave in to the Ring's power, even calling it "my precious"; alarmed, Gandalf spoke harshly to his old friend to persuade him to give it up, which Bilbo did, becoming the first Ring-bearer to surrender it willingly. (Note: Tolkien 1954a, book 1, ch. 1 "A Long-expected Party")

By this time Sauron had regained much of his power, and the Dark Tower in Mordor had been rebuilt. Gollum, released from Mordor, was captured by Aragorn. Gandalf learned from Gollum that Sauron now knew where to find the Ring. To prevent Sauron from reclaiming his Ring, Frodo and eight companions set out from Rivendell for Mordor to destroy the Ring in the fires of Mount Doom. (Note: Tolkien 1954a, book 2, ch. 3 "The Ring goes South") During the quest, Frodo gradually fell under the Ring's power. When he and his faithful servant Sam Gamgee discovered Gollum on their trail and "tamed" him into guiding them to Mordor, Frodo began to feel a bond with the wretched, treacherous creature, while Gollum warmed to Frodo's kindness and made an effort to keep his promise. (Note: Tolkien 1954, book 4, ch. 1 "The Taming of Sméagol") Gollum however gave in to the Ring's temptation, and betrayed Frodo to the spider Shelob. (Note: Tolkien 1954, book 4, ch. 9 "Shelob's Lair") Believing Frodo to be dead, Sam bore the Ring himself for a short time and experienced the temptation it induced. (Note: Tolkien 1954, book 4, ch. 10 "The Choices of Master Samwise")

Sam rescued Frodo from Orcs at the Tower of Cirith Ungol. (Note: Tolkien 1955, book 6, ch. 1 "The Tower of Cirith Ungol") The hobbits, followed by Gollum, reached Mount Doom, where Frodo was overcome by the Ring's power and claimed it for himself. At that moment, Gollum bit off his finger, taking back the Ring, but, gloating and dancing incautiously over the edge of the precipice, he and the Ring fell into the fires of Mount Doom. The Ring and Sauron's power were destroyed, causing Sauron to be reduced to a permanent shadow who could never gain power or have influence in Middle-earth again. (Note: Tolkien 1955, book 6, ch. 3 "Mount Doom")

=== Powers ===
The Ring's primary power was control of the other Rings of Power and domination of the wills of their users. The Ring also conferred power to dominate the wills of other beings whether they were wearing Rings or not—but only in proportion to the user's native capacity. In the same way, it amplified any inherent power its owner possessed.

A mortal ... who keeps one of the Great Rings, does not die, but he does not grow or obtain more life, he merely continues, until at last every minute is a weariness. And if he often uses the Ring to make himself invisible, he fades: He becomes in the end invisible permanently, and walks in the twilight under the eye of the dark power that rules the Rings.

— J. R. R. Tolkien, The Fellowship of the Ring

A mortal wearing the Ring became effectively invisible except to those able to perceive the non-physical world, with only a thin, shaky shadow discernible in the brightest sunlight. All the same, when Sam wore the ring on the edge of Mordor, "he did not feel invisible at all, but horribly and uniquely visible; and he knew that somewhere an Eye was searching for him". Sam was able to understand the Black Speech of Orcs in Mordor during his brief possession of the One Ring. (Note: Tolkien (1954), book 4, ch. 10 "The Choices of Master Samwise")

The Ring extended the life of a mortal possessor indefinitely, preventing natural aging. Gandalf explained that it did not grant new life, but that the possessor merely continued until life became unbearably wearisome. The Ring did not protect its bearer from destruction; Gollum perished in the Crack of Doom, (Note: Tolkien 1955, book 6, ch. 4, "The Field of Cormallen") and Sauron's 'fair' body was destroyed in the downfall of Númenor. He may not have worn it at the time, but he "took [it] up again" when his spirit returned to Mordor. Like the Nine Rings, the One Ring physically corrupted mortals who wore it, eventually transforming them into wraiths. Hobbits were more resistant to this than Men: Gollum, who possessed the ring for 500 years, did not become wraith-like because he rarely wore the Ring. Except for Tom Bombadil, nobody seemed to be immune to the corrupting effects of the One Ring, even powerful beings like Gandalf and Galadriel, who refused to wield it out of the knowledge that they would become like Sauron himself.

Within the land of Mordor where it was forged, the Ring's power increased so significantly that even without wearing it the bearer could draw upon it, and could acquire an aura of terrible power. When Sam encountered an Orc in the Tower of Cirith Ungol while holding the Ring, he appeared to the terrified Orc as a powerful warrior cloaked in shadow "[holding] some nameless menace of power and doom". Similarly at Mount Doom, when Frodo and Sam were attacked by Gollum, Frodo grabbed the Ring and appeared as "a figure robed in white ... [that] held a wheel of fire". Frodo told Gollum "in a commanding voice" that "If you touch me ever again, you shall be cast yourself into the Fire of Doom", a prophecy soon fulfilled.

As the Ring contained much of Sauron's power, it was endowed with a malevolent agency. While separated from Sauron, the Ring strove to return to him by manipulating its bearer to claim ownership of it, or by abandoning its bearer. (Note: Carpenter 2023, #246 to Mrs Eileen Elgar, September 1963 drafts)

To master the Ring's capabilities, a Ring bearer would need a well-trained mind, a strong will, and great native power. Those with weaker minds, such as hobbits and lesser Men, would gain little from the Ring, let alone realize its full potential. Even for one with the necessary strength, it would have taken time to master the Ring's power sufficiently to overthrow Sauron.

The Ring did not render its bearer omnipotent. Three times Sauron suffered military defeat while bearing the Ring, first by Gil-galad in the War of Sauron and the Elves, then by Ar-Pharazôn when Númenórean power so overawed his armies that they deserted him, and at the end of the Second Age with his personal defeat by Gil-galad and Elendil. Tolkien indicates in a speech by Elrond that such a defeat would not have been possible in the waning years of the Third Age, when the strength of the free peoples was greatly diminished. There were no remaining heroes of the stature of Gil-galad, Elendil, or Isildur; the strength of the Elves was fading and they were departing to the Blessed Realm; and the Númenórean kingdoms had either declined or been destroyed, and had few allies.

=== Fate of the Ring-bearers ===
Of the Ring-bearers, three were alive after the Ring's destruction: the hobbits Bilbo, Frodo, and Sam. Bilbo, having borne the Ring the longest, had his life much prolonged. Frodo was scarred physically and mentally by his quest. Sam, having only briefly kept the Ring, was affected the least. In consideration of the trials Bilbo and Frodo faced, the Valar allowed them to travel to the Undying Lands, accompanying Galadriel, Elrond, and Gandalf. Sam is also said to have been taken to the Undying Lands, after living in the Shire for many years and raising a large family. Tolkien emphasized that the restorative sojourn of the Ring-bearers in the Undying Lands would not have been permanent. As mortals, they would eventually die and leave the world of Eä.

== Concept and creation ==
The Ring began as a plot device, not a central narrative theme. As told in The Hobbit, Bilbo found the Ring while lost in the tunnels near Gollum's lair. In the first edition, Gollum offers to surrender the Ring to Bilbo as a reward for winning the Riddle Game. When Tolkien was writing The Lord of the Rings, he realized that the Ring's grip on Gollum would never permit him to give it up willingly. He therefore revised The Hobbit: in the second edition, after losing the Riddle Game to Bilbo, Gollum went to get his "Precious" to help him kill and eat Bilbo, but found the Ring missing. From Bilbo's last question—"What have I got in my pocket?"—Gollum guessed correctly that Bilbo had found the Ring. Gollum sought Bilbo through the caves, not realizing that Bilbo had discovered the Ring's power of invisibility and was following him to the cave's mouth. Bilbo escaped Gollum and the goblins by remaining invisible, but he chose not to tell Gandalf and the dwarves that the Ring had made him invisible. Instead, he told them a story that followed the first edition: that Gollum had given him the Ring and shown him the way out. Gandalf was immediately suspicious of the Ring, and later forced the real story from Bilbo. (Note: Tolkien 1937, ch. 5 "Riddles in the Dark") (Note: Tolkien 1954a, Prologue "Of the Finding of the Ring")

== Origins ==
Scholars have identified numerous more or less plausible sources for, or at least parallels with, the One Ring, acknowledging that Tolkien may have made use of multiple influences, and had intentionally set about to update the myths.

=== Norse mythology and Wagner ===
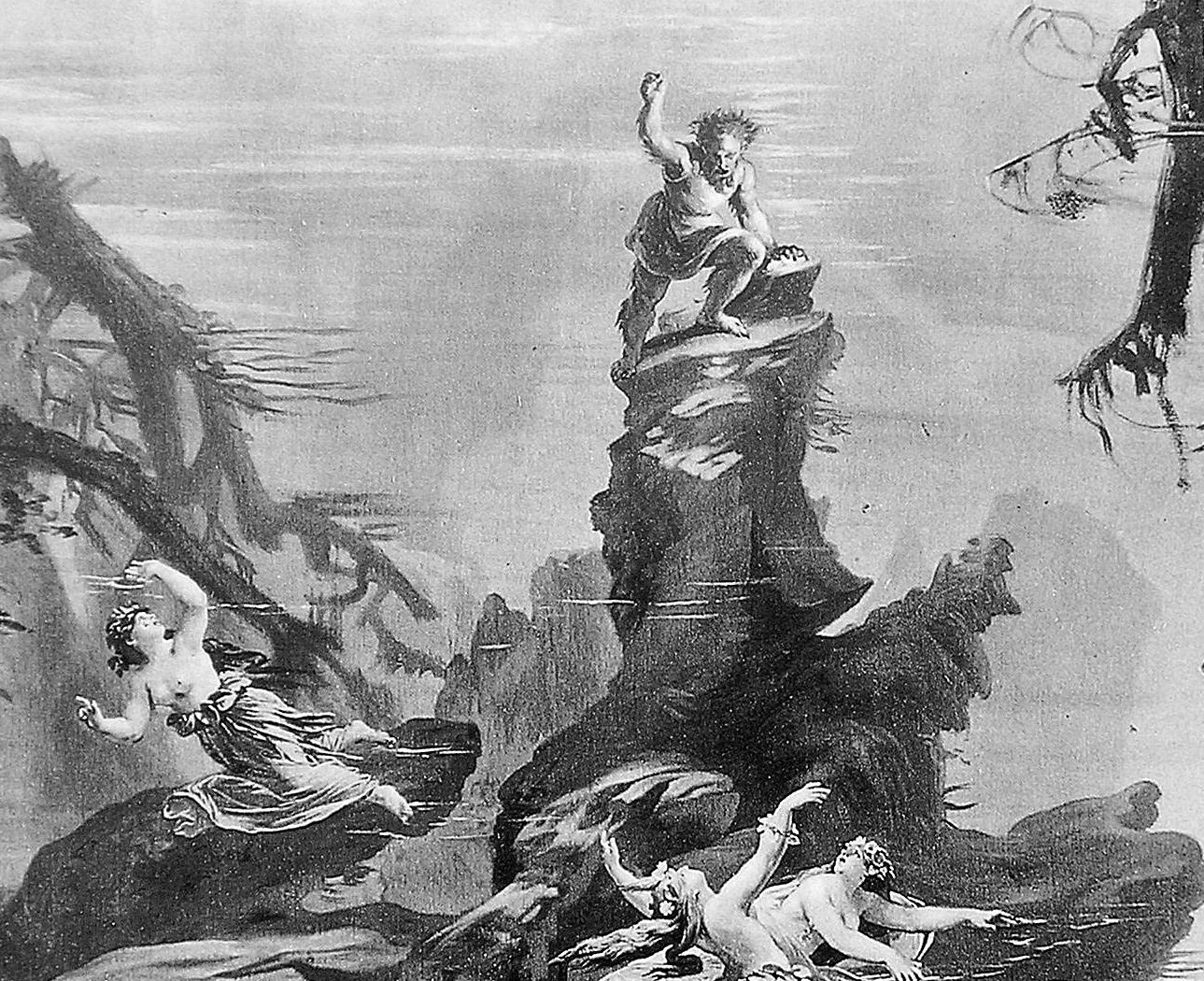
Critics have noted parallels with Richard Wagner's Der Ring des Nibelungen, as seen here in Josef Hoffman's 1876 set design for Das Rheingold, though they disagree on its influence on Tolkien.

Tolkien's use of the Ring was influenced by Norse mythology. While at King Edward's School in Birmingham, he read and translated from the Old Norse in his free time. One of his first Norse purchases was the Völsunga saga. While a student, he read the only available English translation, the 1870 rendering by William Morris of the Victorian Arts and Crafts movement and Icelandic scholar Eiríkur Magnússon. That saga and the Middle High German Nibelungenlied were coeval texts that used the same ancient sources. Both of them provided some of the basis for Richard Wagner's opera series, Der Ring des Nibelungen, featuring in particular a magical but cursed golden ring and a broken sword reforged. In the Völsunga saga, these items are respectively Andvaranaut and Gram, and they correspond broadly to the One Ring and the sword Narsil (reforged as Andúril).

Tolkien dismissed critics' direct comparisons to Wagner, telling his publisher, "Both rings were round, and there the resemblance ceases." (Note: Carpenter 2023, #229 to Allen & Unwin, 23 February 1961) (Note: Carpenter 1977, p. 206) Some critics hold that Tolkien's work borrows so liberally from Wagner that it exists in the shadow of Wagner's. Others, such as Gloriana St. Clair, attribute the resemblances to the fact that Tolkien and Wagner had created works based on the same sources in Norse mythology. Tom Shippey and other researchers hold an intermediary position, stating that the authors indeed used the same source materials, but that Tolkien was indebted to some of the original developments, insights and artistic uses of those sources that first appeared in Wagner, and sought to improve upon them.

=== Curse on a ring-thief at temple of Nodens ===
In 1928, a 4th-century pagan mystery cult temple was excavated at Lydney Park, Gloucestershire. The archaeologist Sir Mortimer Wheeler asked Tolkien to investigate a Latin inscription there, which mentioned the theft of a ring, with a curse upon its thief:

For the god Nodens. Silvianus has lost a ring and has donated one-half [its worth] to Nodens. Among those who are called Senicianus do not allow health until he brings it to the temple of Nodens.

The curse is often associated with the Ring of Silvianus, a Roman gold ring of around the 4th century, found near a former Roman town, Silchester. The ring has an inscription naming Senicianus.

The Anglo-Saxon name for the place was Dwarf's Hill, and in 1932 Tolkien traced Nodens to the Irish hero Nuada Airgetlám, "Nuada of the Silver-Hand". (Note: J. R. R. Tolkien, "The Name Nodens", Appendix to "Report on the excavation of the prehistoric, Roman and post-Roman site in Lydney Park, Gloucestershire", Reports of the Research Committee of the Society of Antiquaries of London, 1932; also in Tolkien Studies: An Annual Scholarly Review, Vol. 4, 2007) Shippey thought this "a pivotal influence" on Tolkien's Middle-earth, combining as it did a god-hero, a ring, dwarves, and a silver hand. The J. R. R. Tolkien Encyclopedia notes the "Hobbit-like appearance of [Dwarf's Hill]'s mine-shaft holes", and that Tolkien was extremely interested in the hill's folklore on his stay there; it cites Helen Armstrong's comment that the place may have inspired Tolkien's "Celebrimbor and the fallen realms of Moria and Eregion". The scholar of English literature John M. Bowers writes that the name of the Elven-smith Celebrimbor, who forged the Elf-rings, is the Sindarin for "Silver Hand".

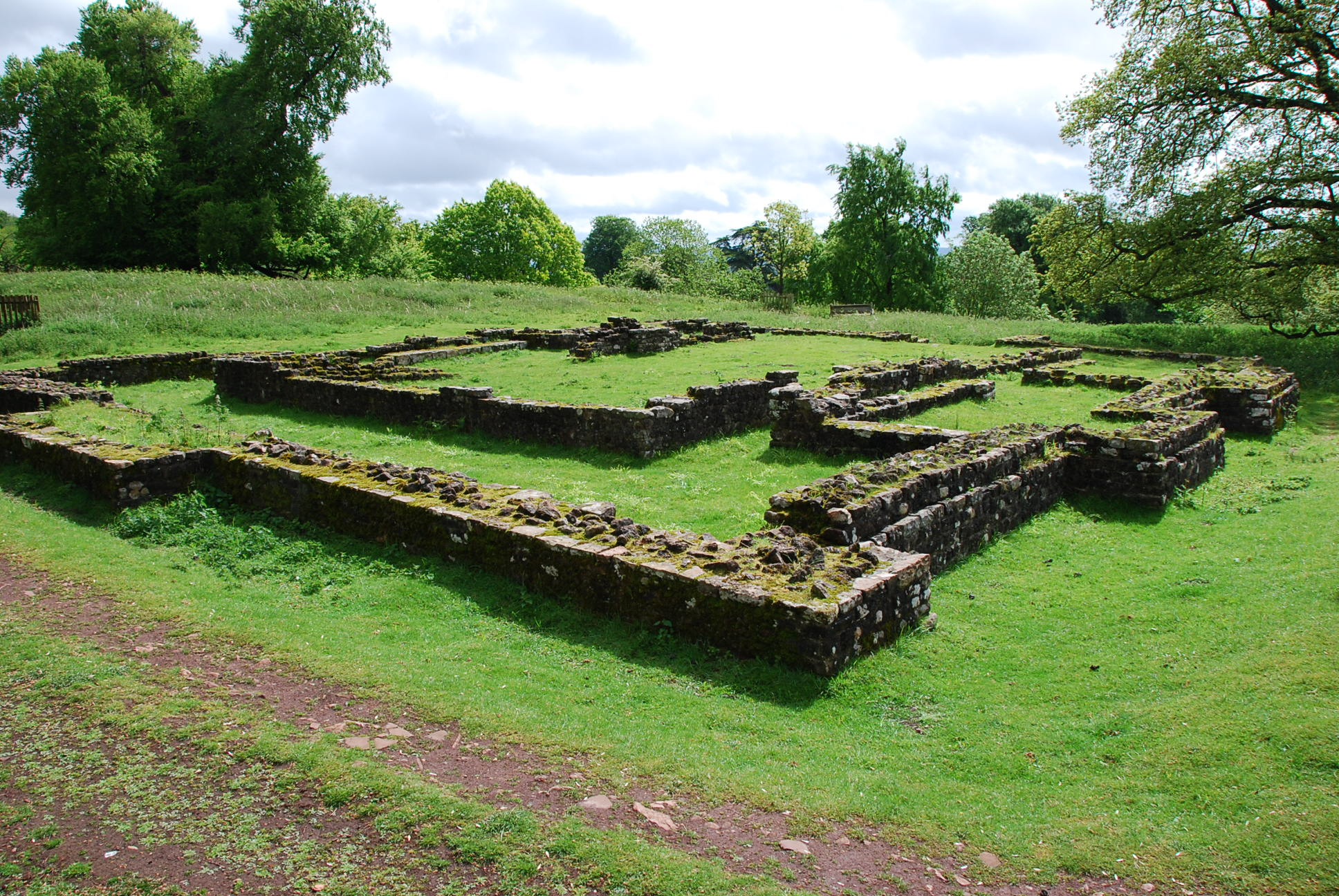
Tolkien visited the temple of Nodens at a place called "Dwarf's Hill" and translated an inscription with a curse upon the thief of a ring. It may have inspired his dwarves, mines, rings, and Celebrimbor "Silver-Hand", the Elven-smith who forged Rings of Power.

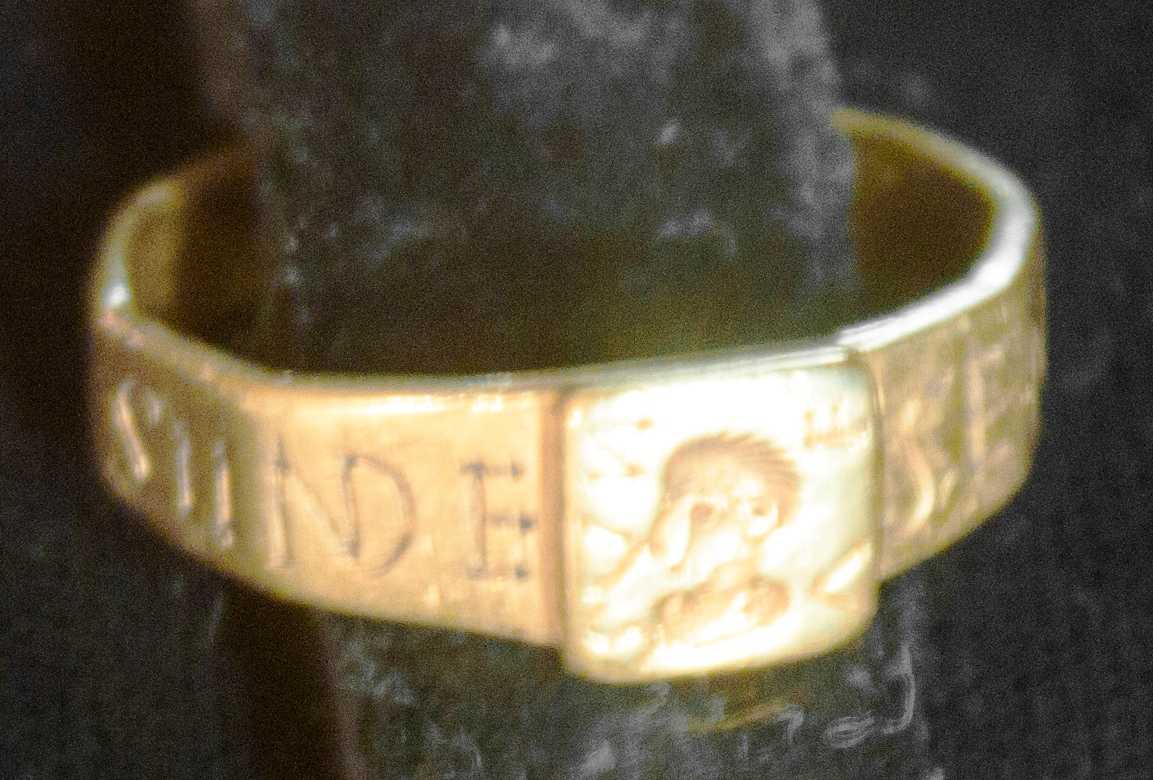
The Ring of Silvianus is a Roman gold ring of around the 4th century, found near a former Roman town, Silchester that has an inscription naming Senecianus.

=== Parallels with Plato's Ring of Gyges in The Republic ===
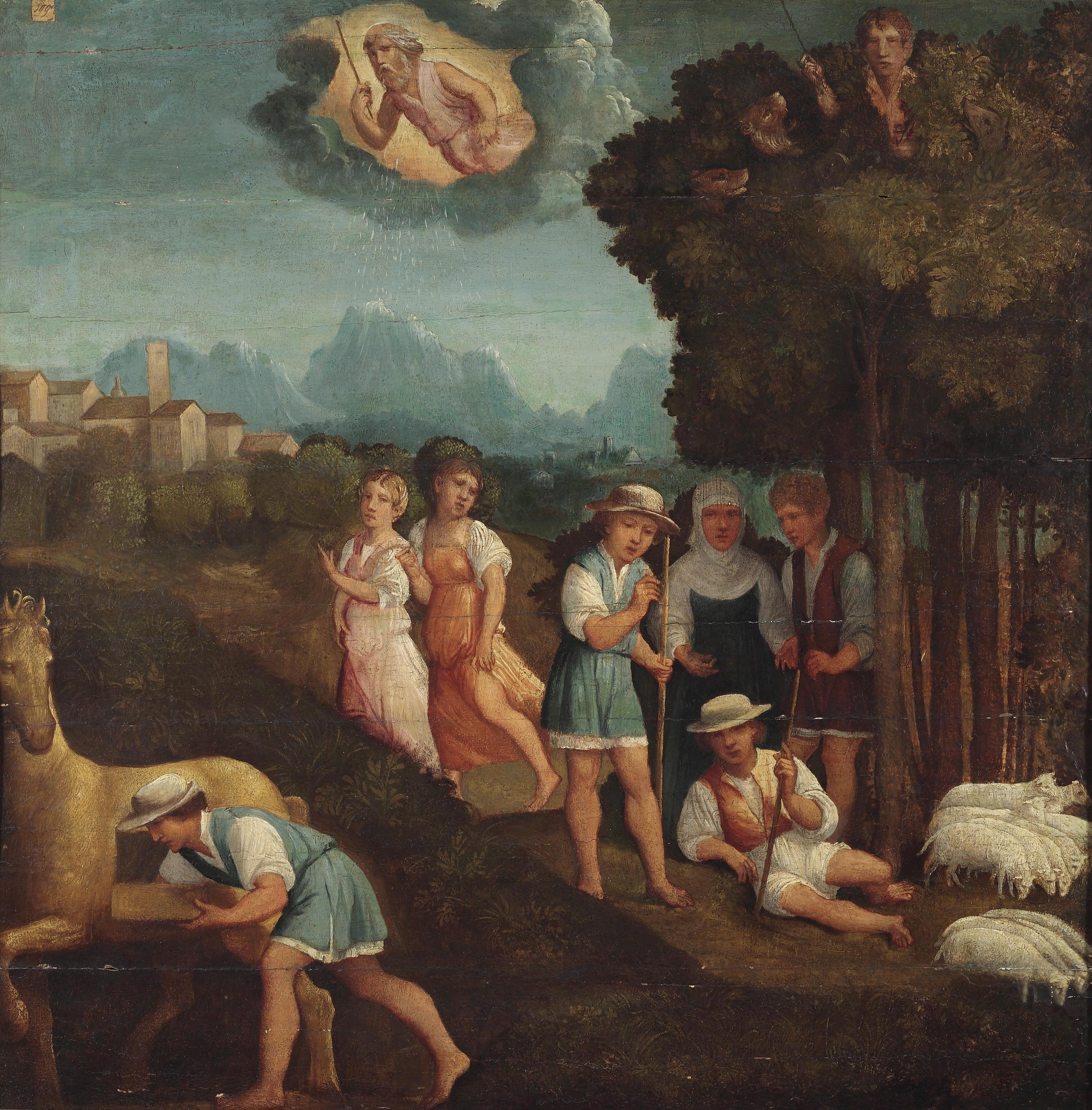
The shepherd Gyges finds the magic ring, setting up a moral dilemma. Ferrara, 16th century

A source that Tolkien "might have borrowed" from, though there is no evidence for this, is Plato's Republic. Its second book tells the story of the Ring of Gyges that gave its owner the power of invisibility. In so doing, it created a moral dilemma, enabling people to commit injustices without fearing they would be caught. In contrast, Tolkien's Ring actively exerts an evil force that destroys the morality of the wearer.

The scholar of humanities Frederick A. de Armas notes parallels between Plato's and Tolkien's rings, and suggests that both Bilbo and Gyges, going into deep dark places to find hidden treasure, may have "undergone a Catabasis", a psychological journey to the Underworld.

Frederick A. de Armas's comparison of Plato's and Tolkien's rings
Story element	Plato's Republic	Tolkien's Middle-earth
Ring's power	Invisibility	Invisibility, and corruption of the wearer
Discovery	Gyges finds ring in a deep chasm	Bilbo finds ring in a deep cave
First use	Gyges ravishes the Queen, kills the King, becomes King of Lydia	Bilbo puts ring on "by accident", is surprised Gollum does not see him
Moral result	Total failure	Bilbo emerges strengthened

The Tolkien scholar Eric Katz, without suggesting that Tolkien was aware of the Ring of Gyges, writes that "Plato argues that such [moral] corruption will occur, but Tolkien shows us this corruption through the thoughts and actions of his characters". In Katz's view, Plato tries to counter the "cynical conclusion" that moral life is chosen by the weak; Glaucon thinks that people are only "good" because they suppose they will be caught if they are not. Plato argues that immoral life is no good as it corrupts one's soul. So, Katz states, according to Plato a moral person has peace and happiness, and would not use a Ring of Power. In Katz's view, Tolkien's story "demonstrate[s] various responses to the question posed by Plato: would a just person be corrupted by the possibility of almost unlimited power?" The question is answered in different ways: Gollum is weak, quickly corrupted, and finally destroyed; Boromir begins virtuous but like Plato's Gyges is corrupted "by the temptation of power" from the Ring, even if he wants to use it for good, but redeems himself by defending the hobbits to his own death; the "strong and virtuous" Galadriel, who sees clearly what she would become if she accepted the ring, and rejects it; the immortal Tom Bombadil, exempt from the Ring's corrupting power and from its gift of invisibility; Sam who in a moment of need faithfully uses the ring, but is not seduced by its vision of "Samwise the Strong, Hero of the Age"; and finally Frodo who is gradually corrupted, but is saved by his earlier mercy to Gollum, and Gollum's desperation for the Ring. Katz concludes that Tolkien's answer to Plato's "Why be moral?" is "to be yourself".

== Analysis ==
=== Applicability not allegory ===
Tolkien stated that The Lord of the Rings was not a point-by-point allegory, particularly not of political events of his time such as the Second World War. (Note: Tolkien 1954a, "Foreword to the Second Edition") At the same time he contrasted 'applicability' which "resides in the freedom of the reader", with 'allegory' which resides in "the purposed domination of the author". He stated that had the Second World War "inspired or directed the development of the legend" as an allegory, then the fate of the Ring, and of Middle-earth, would have been very different:

Tolkien's analysis of how the One Ring would have appeared in an allegory
Story element	The Lord of the Rings	Allegory in Foreword
The Ring	Destroyed	Seized, used against Sauron
Sauron	Annihilated	Enslaved
Barad-dur	Destroyed	Occupied
Saruman	Fails to get the Ring, is killed	Goes to Mordor; in the confusion and treachery learns to make his own Ring, makes war on the new Ruler of Middle-earth
Outcome	Peace, the Shire restored	War, hobbits enslaved and destroyed

Anne C. Petty, writing in The J. R. R. Tolkien Encyclopedia, notes that Tolkien was all the same quite capable of using "allegorical elements when it suited his purpose", and that he agreed that the approach of war in 1938 "had had some effect on it": The Lord of the Rings was applicable to the horror of war in general, as long as it was not taken as a point-by-point allegory of any particular war, with false equations like "Sauron=Satan or Hitler or Stalin, Gandalf=God or Churchill, Aragorn=Christ or MacArthur, the Ring=the atomic bomb, Mordor=Hell or Russia or Germany".

One aspect of such applicability, which the Tolkien scholar Tom Shippey notes is rarely picked up by readers, is that Tolkien chose dates of symbolic importance in Christianity for the quest to destroy the Ring. It began in Rivendell on 25 December, the date of Christmas, and ended on Mount Doom on 25 March, a traditional Anglo-Saxon date for the crucifixion.

=== Object of the quest ===
Diagram of Brian Rosebury's analysis of The Lord of the Rings, as a combined Quest (to destroy the Ring) and Journey (as a series of Tableaux of places in Middle-earth); the two support each other, and must interlock tightly to do so

The scholar of the humanities Brian Rosebury noted that The Lord of the Rings combines a slow, descriptive series of scenes or tableaux illustrating Middle-earth with a unifying plotline in the shape of the quest to destroy the Ring. The Ring needs to be destroyed to save Middle-earth itself from destruction or domination by Sauron. The work builds up Middle-earth as a place that readers come to love, shows that it is under dire threat, and – with the destruction of the Ring – provides the "eucatastrophe" for a happy ending. The work is thus, Rosebury asserted, very tightly constructed, the expansive descriptions and the Ring-based plot fitting together exactly.

=== Addiction to power ===
The Ring offers power to its wearer, and progressively corrupts the wearer's mind to evil. The Tolkien scholar Tom Shippey applies to it Lord Acton's 1887 statement that "Power tends to corrupt, and absolute power corrupts absolutely. Great men are almost always bad men". He notes that the opinion is distinctively modern, and that other modern authors such as George Orwell with Animal Farm (1945), William Golding with Lord of the Flies (1954), and T. H. White with The Once and Future King (1958) similarly wrote about the corrupting effects of power. When the critic Colin Manlove described Tolkien's attitude to power as inconsistent, arguing that the supposedly overwhelming Ring was handed over easily enough by Sam and Bilbo, and had little effect on Aragorn, Legolas, and Gimli; Shippey replies in "one word" that the explanation is simple: The Ring is addictive, increasing in effect with exposure. Other scholars concur about its addictive nature.

== Adaptations ==
The One Ring in Peter Jackson's films.

In the 1981 BBC Radio serial of The Lord of the Rings, the Nazgûl chant the Ring-inscription; the BBC Radiophonic Workshop's sound effects for the Nazgul and the Black Speech of Mordor have been described as "nightmarish".

In Peter Jackson's The Lord of the Rings film trilogy, the wearer of the Ring is portrayed as moving through a shadowy realm where everything is distorted. The effects of the Ring on Bilbo and Frodo are obsessions that have been compared with drug addiction; actor Andy Serkis, who played Gollum, cited drug addiction as an inspiration for his performance. The actual ring used for the films was designed and created by Jens Hansen Gold & Silversmith in Nelson, New Zealand, and was based on a simple wedding ring. Polygon highlighted that

the workshop produced approximately 40 different rings for the films. Most expensive were the 18 carat solid gold 'hero' rings, size 10 for Frodo’s hand and 11 for the chain. ... To save money – though not time – the workshop used gold-plated sterling silver for most of the rings. ... For many fans, the ring used in close-ups – like the scene where the Ring slips away from Frodo to lure Boromir in the snow at Caradhras, or when arguing participants in the Council of Elrond are shown reflected in the Ring’s surface – is the real 'hero ring'. In order to capture the ring's sheen in high definition, that prop was a full eight inches wide – too big even for Hansen's tools. Instead, a local machine shop made and polished the shape that Hansen’s team then plated.

A tabletop Middle-earth roleplaying game, The One Ring, was manufactured by Cubicle 7; a new edition is planned by a partnership of Sophisticated Games and Free League Publishing from 2020.

Cards representing the One Ring were included in a Lord of the Rings-themed Magic: The Gathering set, of which one copy was unique, printed with its own artwork and Tengwar text. That unique card was purchased by the singer Post Malone for US$2 million, making it one of the most expensive CCG cards.
