= Ralph C. Wood =

American academic

Ralph C. Wood is a scholar of theology and English literature, with a special interest in Christian writers, mainly of fiction, including J. R. R. Tolkien, C. S. Lewis, G. K. Chesterton, Gerard Manley Hopkins, George Herbert, and Dorothy Sayers.

== Biography ==
Ralph Wood gained his bachelor's and master's degrees from East Texas State College, graduating in 1965, and took his PhD at the University of Chicago in 1975. He served as a lecturer in English at North Park College in Chicago before moving to Wake Forest University in the first of several academic employments in religion; he has taught at Samford University, Regent College, Vancouver, and Providence College, Rhode Island. In 1998 he became University Professor of Theology and Literature at Baylor University, where he teaches, researches, and writes books.

== Awards and distinctions ==
- 2010 Associated Church Press Award of Excellence for Best Critical Review
- 2011 Lionel Basney Award for Outstanding Essay published in Christianity and Literature

== Reception ==
=== Gospel According to Tolkien ===
Dan Muth, reviewing The Gospel According to Tolkien for The Living Church, wrote that it deserved a receptive audience, and was likely to get one; it made engaging use of Tolkien's work and "would serve as an excellent introduction to the virtues". Bradley J. Birzer writes in The J. R. R. Tolkien Encyclopedia that Wood makes the case that "the Christian Gospel is embedded into the very foundations of Tolkien's mythology".

=== Tolkien among the Moderns ===
Robin Anne Reid, reviewing Tolkien among the Moderns for Journal of Tolkien Research, notes that Wood's "brief editorial frame" for the essay collection claims that Tolkien is neither escapist nor antiquarian; that his Middle-earth writings are centred on "a profound moral and religious vision"; and that Tolkien had a "largely unnoticed" engagement with "major literary figures and philosophical movements of our time". Reid then states that Wood overlooks the "substantial body of scholarship" from the 1980s onwards that investigates Tolkien's engagement with modernism, mentioning the work of scholars such as Dimitra Fimi, Verlyn Flieger, and especially Weinreich and Honegger's Tolkien and Modernity. "The other major flaw", writes Reid, is the failure to define the "moderns" other than chronologically; in his view, the lack of definition of the subject makes the collection "lacking in coherence and structure".

Christopher Snyder, reviewing the book for Christianity and Literature, notes that readers looking for comparisons of Tolkien with modernist authors such as Virginia Woolf and Aldous Huxley "will be mostly disappointed", as only James Joyce and Iris Murdoch (who much admired The Lord of the Rings) feature largely. Instead, Wood looks at everything from Platonism and Cervantes to Nietzsche, Emmanuel Levinas, and postmodernism. Snyder calls Wood "one of the most original of those Tolkien scholars who focus on religious dimensions". He is pleased to see that the book provides insights into Tolkien's philosophy and political science as well as theology and gender equality.

== Books ==
- 1991 The Comedy of Redemption: Christian Faith and Comic Vision in Four American Novelists. University of Notre Dame Press.
- 2003 The Gospel According to Tolkien: Visions of the Kingdom in Middle-earth. Westminster John Knox Press.
- 2003 Contending for the Faith: The Church’s Engagement with Culture (Interpreting Christian Texts and Traditions Series). Baylor University Press.
- 2004 Flannery O'Connor and the Christ-Haunted South. Wm. B. Eerdmans Publishing Company.
- 2008 Literature and Theology (Horizons in Theology series). Abingdon Press.
- 2009 Preaching and Professing: Sermons by a Teacher Seeking to Proclaim the Gospel. Wm. B. Eerdmans Publishing Company.
- 2011 Chesterton: The Nightmare Goodness of God. Baylor University Press.
- 2015 Tolkien Among the Moderns. University of Notre Dame Press.
