= Bilbo Baggins =

Protagonist in J. R. R. Tolkien's The Hobbit

- Middle-earth character
- Bilbo in Bag End, by J. R. R. Tolkien

In-universe information
- Race: Hobbit
- Family: Belladonna Took (mother); Bungo Baggins (father); Gerontius "The Old" Took (grandfather); Frodo Baggins (younger cousin)
- Home: Bag End, The Shire

Bilbo Baggins (Note: Westron: Bilba Labingi) is the title character and protagonist of J. R. R. Tolkien's 1937 novel The Hobbit, a supporting character in The Lord of the Rings, and the fictional narrator (along with Frodo Baggins) of many of Tolkien's Middle-earth writings. The Hobbit is selected by the wizard Gandalf to help Thorin Oakenshield and his party of Dwarves reclaim their ancestral home and treasure, which has been seized by the dragon Smaug.

Bilbo's way of life in the Shire, defined by features like the availability of tobacco and postal service, recalls that of the English middle class during the Victorian to Edwardian eras. This is not compatible with the much older world of Dwarves and Elves. Tolkien appears to have based Bilbo on the designer William Morris' travels in Iceland; Morris liked his home comforts but grew through his adventurous journeying. Bilbo's quest has been interpreted as a "pilgrimage of grace", in which he grows in both wisdom and virtue, and as a psychological journey towards wholeness.

Bilbo has appeared in numerous radio and film adaptations of The Hobbit and The Lord of the Rings, and video games based on them.

== Appearances ==
=== The Hobbit ===
The protagonist of The Hobbit, Bilbo Baggins, is a middle-aged hobbit. He is hired as a "burglar", despite his initial objections, on the recommendation of the wizard Gandalf and 13 Dwarves led by their king in exile, Thorin Oakenshield. The company of dwarves are on a quest to reclaim the Lonely Mountain and its treasures from the dragon Smaug. (Note: Tolkien 1937, ch. 1 "An Unexpected Party") The adventure takes Bilbo and his companions through the wilderness, (Note: Tolkien 1937, ch. 2 "Roast Mutton") to the Elvish haven of Rivendell, (Note: Tolkien 1937, ch. 3 "A Short Rest") across the Misty Mountains where, escaping from goblins, (Note: Tolkien 1937, ch. 4 "Over Hill and Under Hill") he meets Gollum and acquires a magic ring. (Note: Tolkien 1937, ch. 5 "Riddles in the Dark") His journey continues via a lucky escape from wargs, goblins, and fire, (Note: Tolkien 1937, ch. 6 "Out of the Frying-Pan into the Fire") to the house of Beorn the shapeshifter, (Note: Tolkien 1937, ch. 7 "Queer Lodgings") through the black forest of Mirkwood, (Note: Tolkien 1937, ch. 8 "Flies and Spiders") to Lake-town in the middle of Long Lake, (Note: Tolkien 1937, ch. 9 "Barrels out of Bond") and eventually to the Mountain itself. (Note: Tolkien 1937, ch. 11 "On the Doorstep")

As burglar, Bilbo is sent down the secret passage to the dragon's lair. He steals a golden cup and takes it back to the Dwarves. Smaug awakes and instantly notices the theft and a draught of cold air from the opened passage. He flies out, nearly catches the Dwarves outside the door, and eats their ponies. Bilbo and the Dwarves hide inside the passage. Bilbo goes down to Smaug's lair again to steal some more, but the dragon is now only half-asleep. Wearing his magic ring, Bilbo is invisible, but Smaug at once smells him. Bilbo has a riddling conversation with Smaug, and notices that the dragon's armour does indeed have a gap. He escapes the dragon's flames as he runs up the passage, and tells the Dwarves about the gap in Smaug's armour. An old thrush hears what he says, and flies off to tell Bard in Lake-town. (Note: Tolkien 1937, ch. 12 "Inside Information")

Smaug realizes that Lake-town must have helped Bilbo, and flies off to destroy the town. After Smaug is killed in the attack, the Dwarves reclaim the Lonely Mountain, and horrify Bilbo by refusing to share the dragon's treasure with the lake-men or the wood-elves. Bilbo finds the Arkenstone of Thrain, the most precious heirloom of Thorin's family, but hides it. Thorin calls his relative Dáin to bring an army of Dwarves. (Note: Tolkien 1937, ch. 15 "The Gathering of the Clouds") Thorin and his dwarves fortify the entrance to the mountain hall, and are besieged by the Wood-elves and Lake-men. Bilbo tries to ransom the Arkenstone to prevent fighting, but Thorin sees his action as betrayal, and banishes Bilbo. Dain arrives, and the army of Dwarves faces off against the armies of Elves and Men. As battle is joined, a host of goblins and wargs arrive to take over the mountain, now that Smaug is dead. The armies of Elves, Men, and Dwarves, with the help of Eagles and Beorn, defeat the goblins and wargs. (Note: Tolkien 1937, ch. 17 "The Clouds Burst") Thorin is fatally wounded, but makes peace with Bilbo as he dies. Bilbo accepts only a little of the treasure which was his share, though it still represents great wealth for a Shire hobbit. Bilbo returns to his home in the Shire to find that several of his relatives, believing him to be dead, are trying to claim his home and possessions. (Note: Tolkien 1937, ch. 19 "The Last Stage")

=== The Lord of the Rings ===
The Lord of the Rings begins with Bilbo's "eleventy-first" (111th) birthday, 60 years after the beginning of The Hobbit. The main character of the novel is Frodo Baggins, Bilbo's cousin, (Note: Although Frodo calls Bilbo his "uncle", they were in fact first and second cousins, once removed either way (Bilbo is Frodo's paternal great-great-uncle's son's son and his maternal great-aunt's son).) who celebrates his 33rd birthday and legally comes of age on the same day. Bilbo has kept the ring, with no idea of its significance. It has prolonged his life and delayed signs of aging, but he has grown increasingly dependent upon it, leaving him feeling "thin and stretched". At the party, Bilbo tries to leave with the ring, but Gandalf persuades him to leave it behind for Frodo. (Note: Tolkien 1954a, book 1, ch. 1 "A Long-expected Party") Bilbo travels to Rivendell and visits the dwarves of the Lonely Mountain before returning to retire at Rivendell and write books. (Note: Tolkien 1954a, book 2, ch. 2 "Many Meetings")

Gandalf discovers that Bilbo's ring is the One Ring forged by the Dark Lord Sauron, and sets in motion the quest to destroy it. (Note: Tolkien 1954a, book 1, ch. 2 "The Shadow of the Past") Frodo and his friends set off on the quest, finding Bilbo, having greatly aged without the ring, in Rivendell. When they have destroyed the ring, they return to the Shire, via Rivendell, where Bilbo looks "very old, but peaceful, and sleepy". (Note: Tolkien 1955, book 6, ch. 6 "Many Partings") (Note: Tolkien 1955, book 6, ch. 8 "The Scouring of the Shire") Two years later Bilbo accompanies Gandalf, Elrond, Galadriel, and Frodo to the Grey Havens, there to board ship bound for Tol Eressëa across the sea. (Note: Tolkien 1954a, Prologue, "Of the Ordering of the Shire")

=== Narrator ===
In Tolkien's narrative conceit, in which all the writings of Middle-earth are translations from the fictitious volume of the Red Book of Westmarch, Bilbo is the author of The Hobbit, translator of various "works from the elvish", (Note: Tolkien 1955, "Appendix A – Annals of the Kings and Rulers") and the author of the following poems and songs:

- "A Walking Song" (Note: Tolkien 1954a, book 1, ch. 3 "Three is Company")
- "All that is gold does not glitter", based on Shakespeare's The Merchant of Venice, which uses "glisters" instead of "glitters"
- "The Man in the Moon Stayed Up Too Late", (Note: Sung by Frodo but said to have been created by Bilbo.Tolkien 1937, book 1, ch. 9 "At the Sign of the Prancing Pony") adapted from the nursery rhyme "Hey Diddle Diddle", supposedly as its ancestral form
- "The Road Goes Ever On" (Note: Tolkien 1937, ch. 19 "The Last Stage")
- "Bilbo's Last Song", describing Bilbo's contemplation of his forthcoming voyage to the Undying Lands.

== Analysis ==
=== Name ===
Baggins vs Huggins: Tolkien invented the name Baggins, which sounded like a real English surname such as Huggins or Dickens, but was a Huddersfield dialect word meaning an extra meal. He used Huggins as a Troll's surname.

The philologist and Tolkien scholar Tom Shippey notes that "Baggins" is close to the spoken words bæggin, bægginz in the dialect of Huddersfield, Yorkshire. where it means a substantial meal eaten between main meals, most particularly at teatime in the afternoon; and Mr Baggins is definitely, Shippey writes, "partial to ... his tea". Tolkien worked in Yorkshire early in his career, at the University of Leeds; from 1920 he was a reader in the school of English studies, and he rose to become a full professor there. More specifically, he wrote the foreword to Walter E. Haigh's 1928 A new glossary of the dialect of the Huddersfield district, which included these spoken words.

In addition, "Baggins", while not a name by etymology, sounds very much like one of a class of English surnames such as Dickens, Jenkins, and Huggins. These names, Shippey notes, are formed from personal names, in the diminutive form; and Tolkien uses Huggins as the name of one of the Trolls in The Hobbit.

Tolkien's choice of the surname Baggins may be connected to the name of Bilbo's house, Bag End, also the actual name of Tolkien's aunt's farmhouse, which Shippey notes was at the bottom of a lane with no exit. This is called a "cul-de-sac" (Note: The French words in this phrase mean "bottom-of-[a]-bag", "Bag End", while the French word for a street with no exit, Shippey observes, is impasse.) in England; Shippey describes this as "a silly phrase", a piece of "French-oriented snobbery".

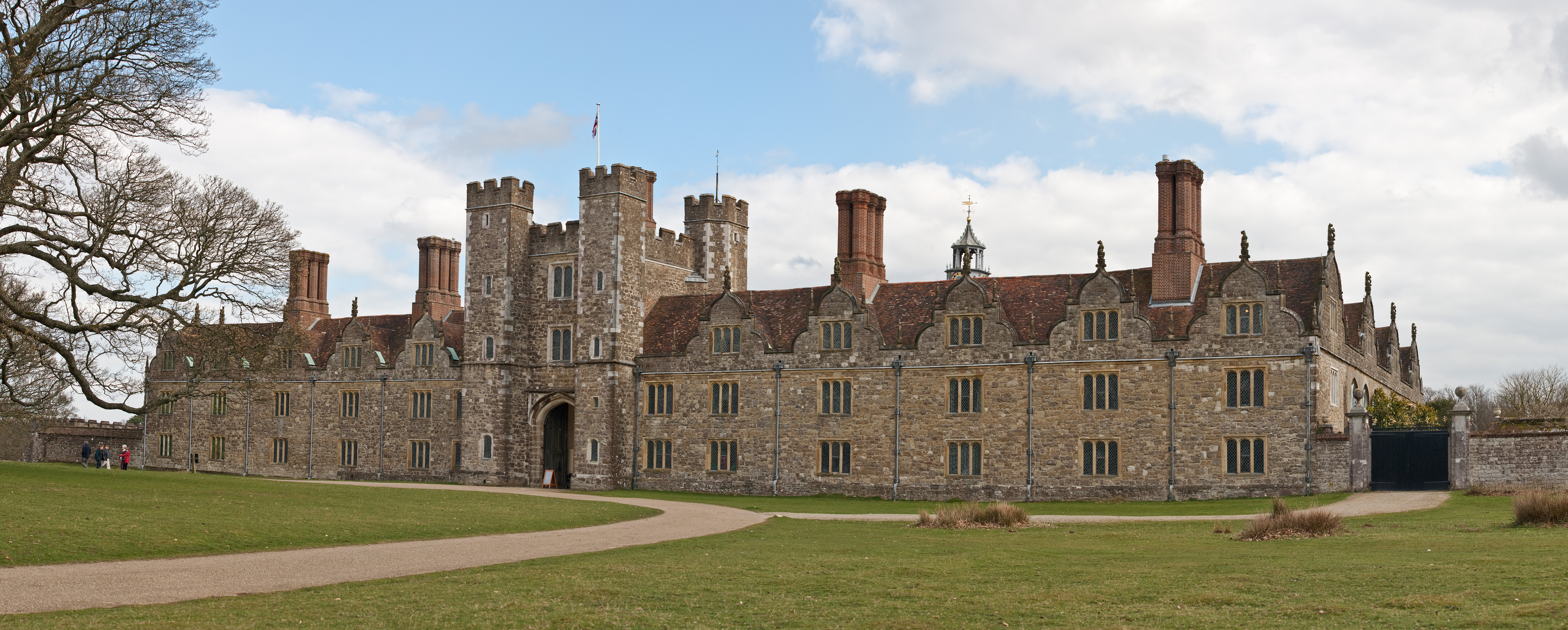
Lobelia Sackville-Baggins's desire to acquire 'Bag End', Bilbo's hobbit-hole, has been compared to Vita Sackville-West's frustrated desire to inherit Knole House (pictured).

Shippey observes that Bilbo's socially aspiring cousins Lobelia and Otho Sackville-Baggins have similarly attempted to "Frenchify" their family name, Sac[k]-ville = "Bag Town", as a mark of their bourgeois status. The journalist Matthew Dennison, writing for St Martin's Press, calls Lobelia Sackville-Baggins "Tolken's unmistakable nod to Vita Sackville-West", an aristocratic novelist and gardening columnist as passionately attached to her family home, Knole House, which she was unable to inherit, as Lobelia was to Bag End. The opposite of a bourgeois is a burglar who breaks into bourgeois houses, and in The Hobbit Bilbo is asked to become a burglar (of Smaug the dragon's lair), Shippey writes, showing that the Bagginses and the Sackville-Bagginses are "connected opposites". He comments that the name Sackville-Baggins, for the snobbish branch of the Baggins family, is "an anomaly in Middle-earth and a failure of tone".

=== Period ===
Bilbo's distinctly anachronistic period, compared to the characters he meets, can be defined, Shippey notes, by the presence of tobacco, brought to Europe in 1559, and a postal service, introduced in England in 1840. (Note: The Annotated Hobbit notes also that Bilbo feels for matches (a 19th century invention) to light his pipe.) Like Tolkien himself, Bilbo was "English, middle class; and roughly Victorian to Edwardian", something that as Shippey observes, does not belong to the much older world of elves, dwarves, and wizards.

=== Character ===
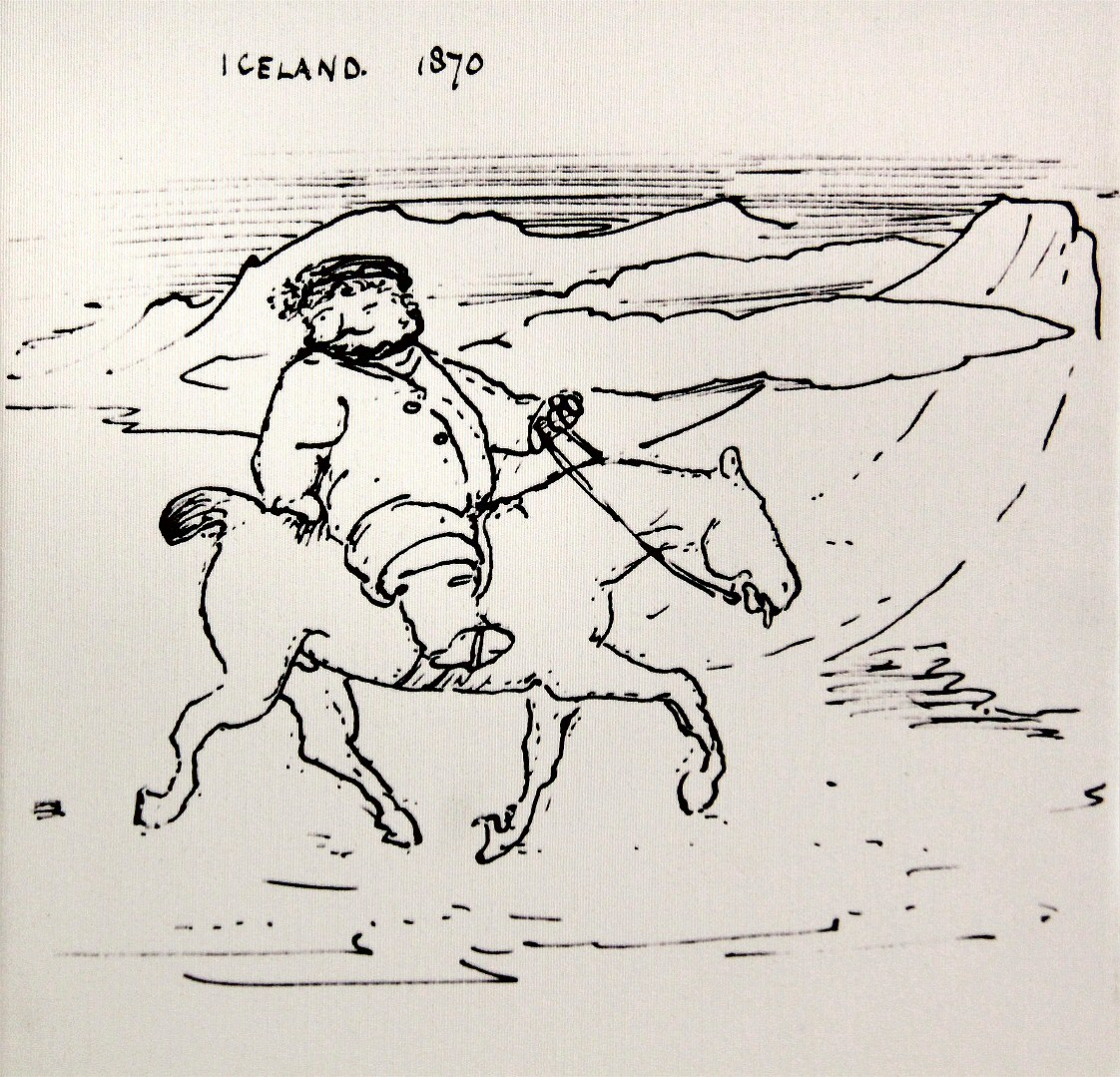
Bilbo's character and adventures match many details of William Morris's expedition in Iceland. Cartoon of Morris riding a pony by his travelling companion Edward Burne-Jones (1870)

Marjorie Burns, a medievalist, writes that Bilbo's character and adventures match the fantasy writer and designer William Morris's account of his travels in Iceland in the early 1870s in numerous details. Like Bilbo's, Morris's party set off enjoyably into the wild on ponies. He meets a "boisterous" man called "Biorn the boaster" who lives in a hall beside Eyja-fell, and who tells Morris, tapping him on the belly, "... besides, you know you are so fat", just as Beorn pokes Bilbo "most disrespectfully" and compares him to a plump rabbit. Burns notes that Morris was "relatively short, a little rotund, and affectionately called 'Topsy', for his curly mop of hair", all somewhat hobbit-like characteristics. Further, she writes, "Morris in Iceland often chooses to place himself in a comic light and to exaggerate his own ineptitude", just as Morris's companion, the painter Edward Burne-Jones, gently teased his friend by depicting him as very fat in his Iceland cartoons. Burns suggests that these images "make excellent models" for the Bilbo who runs puffing to the Green Dragon inn or "jogs along behind Gandalf and the dwarves" on his quest. Another definite resemblance is the emphasis on home comforts: Morris enjoyed a pipe, a bath, and "regular, well-cooked meals"; Morris looked as out of place in Iceland as Bilbo did "over the Edge of the Wild"; both are afraid of dark caves; and both grow through their adventures.

=== Quest ===
The Christian writer Joseph Pearce describes The Hobbit as "a pilgrimage of grace, in which its protagonist, Bilbo Baggins, becomes grown up ... in wisdom and virtue". Dorothy Matthews sees the story rather as a psychological journey, the anti-heroic Bilbo being willing to face challenges while firmly continuing to love home and discovering himself. Along the way, Matthews sees Jungian archetypes, talismans, and symbols at every turn: the Jungian wise old man Gandalf; the devouring mother of the giant spider, not to mention Gollum's "long grasping fingers"; the Jungian circle of the self, the ring; the escape from the dark underground imprisoning chambers of the wood-elves and Bilbo's symbolic rebirth into the sunlight and the waters of the woodland river; and the dragon guarding the contested treasure, itself "an archetype of the self, of psychic wholeness". Later research has extended Matthews' analysis using alternative psychological frameworks such as Erik Erikson's theory of development.

=== Genealogy ===
The Tolkien scholar Jason Fisher notes that Tolkien stated that hobbits were extremely "clannish" and had strong "predilections for genealogy". Accordingly, Tolkien's decision to include the Baggins and other hobbit family trees in Lord of the Rings (Note: Tolkien 1955, "Appendix C – Baggins of Hobbiton") gives the book, in Fisher's view, a strongly "hobbitish perspective". The tree also, he notes, serves to show Bilbo's and Frodo's connections and familial characteristics, including that Bilbo was both "a Baggins and a Took". Fisher observes that Bilbo is, like Aragorn: a "distillation of the best of two families"; he notes that in The Quest of Erebor, a manuscript of Tolkien's collected in the Unfinished Tales, Gandalf is given the lines "So naturally, thinking over the hobbits that I knew, I said to myself, 'I want a dash of the [adventurous] Took ... and I want a good foundation of the stolider sort, a Baggins perhaps.' That pointed at once to Bilbo".

The Tolkien critic Tom Shippey notes that Tolkien was very interested in such names, describing Shire names at length in The Lord of the Rings "Appendix F". (Note: Tolkien 1955, "Appendix F", 2, "On Translation") One category was the names that meant nothing to the hobbits "in their daily language", like Bilbo and Bungo; a few of these, like Otho and Drogo in the family tree, were "by accident, the same as modern English names".

== Adaptations ==
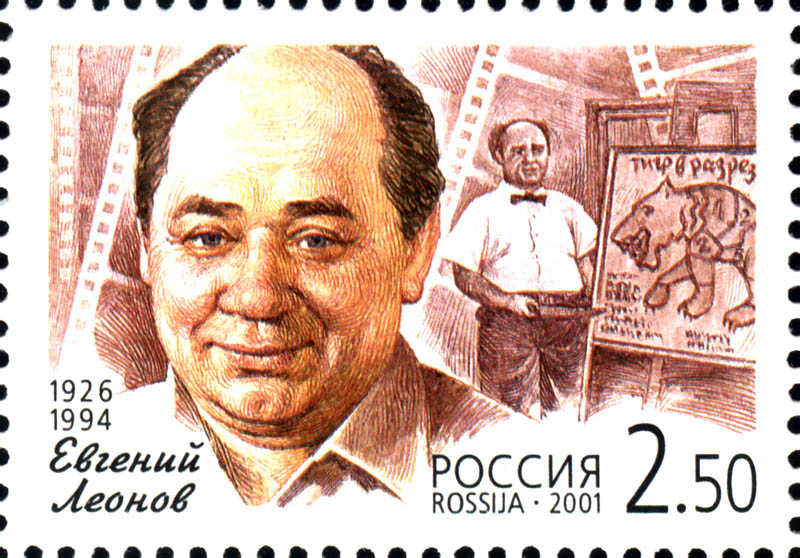
The illustrations of Bilbo in the 1976 Russian translation of The Hobbit were based on the actor Yevgeny Leonov (shown here on a postage stamp).

In the 1955–1956 BBC Radio serialization of The Lord of the Rings, Bilbo was played by Felix Felton. In the 1968 BBC Radio serialization of The Hobbit, Bilbo was played by Paul Daneman.

The 1969 parody Bored of the Rings by "Harvard Lampoon" (i.e. its co-founders Douglas Kenney and Henry Beard) modifies the hobbit's name to "Dildo Bugger".

In the 1977 Rankin/Bass animated version of The Hobbit, Bilbo was voiced by Orson Bean. Bean also voiced both the aged Bilbo and Frodo in the same company's 1980 adaptation of The Return of the King.

The 1976 Russian translation of The Hobbit was illustrated with drawings by Mikhail Belomlinsky; he based his Bilbo character on the actor Yevgeny Leonov, who he described as "good-natured, plump, with hairy legs".

In Ralph Bakshi's 1978 animated version of The Lord of the Rings, Bilbo was voiced by Norman Bird. Billy Barty was the model for Bilbo in the live-action recordings Bakshi used for rotoscoping. The 3000th story to be broadcast in the BBC's long-running children's programme Jackanory was The Hobbit, in 1979. Four narrators told the story with Bilbo's part being played by Bernard Cribbins.

In the BBC's 1981 radio serialization of The Lord of the Rings, Bilbo is played by John Le Mesurier. In the unlicensed 1985 Soviet version on the Leningrad TV channel, Хоббита ("The Hobbit"), Bilbo was played by Mikhail Danilov. In the 1993 television miniseries Hobitit by Finnish broadcaster Yle, Bilbo is portrayed by Martti Suosalo.

Ian Holm as an older Bilbo Baggins in Peter Jackson's 2001 film The Lord of the Rings: The Fellowship of the Ring. Holm reprised this role in the 2012–2014 The Hobbit film trilogy.

In Peter Jackson's films The Fellowship of the Ring (2001) and The Return of the King (2003), Bilbo is played by Ian Holm, who had played Frodo in the BBC radio series 20 years earlier.

Throughout the 2003 video game The Hobbit, the players control Bilbo, voiced by Michael Beattie. The game follows the plot of the book, but adds the elements of platform gameplay and various side-objectives along the main quests. In The Lord of the Rings Online (2007) Bilbo resides in Rivendell, mostly playing riddle games with the Elf Lindir in the Hall of Fire.

In Peter Jackson's The Hobbit film series, a prequel to The Lord of the Rings, the young Bilbo is portrayed by Martin Freeman, while Ian Holm reprises his role as an older Bilbo in An Unexpected Journey (2012) and The Battle of the Five Armies (2014).

== See also ==
- The Quest of Erebor

== Sources ==
- Tolkien, J. R. R. (1937). The Hobbit. United Kingdom: George Allen & Unwin.
- Tolkien, J. R. R. (1954a). The Fellowship of the Ring. The Lord of the Rings. Boston: Houghton Mifflin. OCLC 9552942.
- Tolkien, J. R. R. (1955). The Return of the King. The Lord of the Rings. Boston: Houghton Mifflin. OCLC 519647821.
