= Tolkien and the modernists =

Effect on Tolkien's legendarium

J. R. R. Tolkien, the author of the bestselling fantasy The Lord of the Rings, was largely rejected by the literary establishment during his lifetime, but has since been accepted into the literary canon, if not as a modernist then certainly as a modern writer responding to his times. He fought in the First World War, and saw the rural England that he loved built over and industrialised. His Middle-earth fantasy writings, consisting largely of a legendarium which was not published until after his death, embodied his realism about the century's traumatic events, and his Christian hope.

Scholars have compared Tolkien to authors of the 19th and 20th centuries, writing that he fits into the romantic tradition of William Morris and W. B. Yeats; has some connection with the Celtic Revival and the Symbolist movement; can be likened to the romantic Little Englandism and anti-statism of George Orwell and G. K. Chesterton between the wars; and the disillusionment of Orwell, William Golding, and Kurt Vonnegut after the Second World War.

Tolkien's writing has some clearly modern features, especially the strong emphasis on intertextuality, like the work of T. S. Eliot and Ezra Pound; but he differs from them in using the diverse materials not so as to present a fragmented collage, but to create a world of his own, providing a mythic prehistory, a mythology for England.

== Context ==
=== J. R. R. Tolkien ===
The author of the bestselling fantasy novel The Lord of the Rings, J. R. R. Tolkien, born in 1892, was orphaned as a boy, his father dying in South Africa and his mother in England a few years later. He was brought up by his guardian, the Catholic priest Father Francis Morgan, and educated at boys' grammar schools and then Exeter College, Oxford. He joined the British Army's Lancashire Fusiliers and saw the horror of trench warfare in the First World War. After the war he became a professor of English language at the University of Leeds, and then at the University of Oxford. He specialised in philology, especially Old English works such as Beowulf, taking little interest in English literature written after the Medieval period. He died in 1973.

=== Literary rejection ===
Tolkien encountered sharp criticism for The Lord of the Rings from literary figures such as Edmund Wilson and Edwin Muir. The hostility continued for some years after his death with attacks from writers such as Michael Moorcock in his essay "Epic Pooh". In 2001, The New York Times reviewer Judith Shulevitz criticized his "pedantry", while in the London Review of Books, Jenny Turner attacked it as a "cosy little universe" for "vulnerable people". In 2002, the critic Richard Jenkyns in The New Republic criticized it for lacking psychological depth.

== Rehabilitation ==
A large part of Tolkien's output, worked on throughout his career, was his Legendarium, the complex and dark body of writings (navigable links in diagram) that underlies The Silmarillion. His work reflects the changing nature of the world in the 20th century.

21st century scholars, largely accepting Tolkien as modern, have offered a variety of estimations of his position in the literary canon, from recognising his realism in the face of the collective traumas of his time, to noting his romanticism, and describing the long-established elegiac tone of his writings, aligning Middle-earth with the modern world.

=== Realism and hope ===
Theresa Nicolay showed in her 2014 book Tolkien and the Modernists that Tolkien's Middle-earth fantasy, like Modernism, was created as a reaction to two collective traumas of the 20th century, namely industrialisation and the mechanised mass killing of the First World War. These traumas left people with feelings of hopelessness and alienation, and a sense that good tradition was broken and that religion had failed. Tolkien differed from many modernists in having a strong Catholic faith, giving him hope. Nicolay described how this combination of realism and hope guided Tolkien's Middle-earth writings.

The scholar of theology Ralph C. Wood, in his 2015 book Tolkien among the Moderns, argued that Tolkien was neither escapist nor antiquarian, and had engaged with modern literary figures such as James Joyce and Iris Murdoch. His book was criticised for overlooking scholarship on Tolkien's engagement with modernism, such as the work of Verlyn Flieger, Dimitra Fimi, who examined his attitudes to race, and the 2-volume collection Tolkien and Modernity edited by Thomas Honegger and Frank Weinreich in 2006.

=== Romantic Little Englandism ===
In 2005, the Tolkien scholar Patchen Mortimer commented on the "contentious debate" about Tolkien, noting that his many readers found his books and "the attendant languages, histories, maps, artwork, and apocrypha" a huge accomplishment, while his critics "dismiss[ed] his work as childish, irrelevant, and worse". Mortimer observed in 2005 that admirers and critics had treated his work as "escapist and romantic", nothing to do with the 20th century. Mortimer called this "an appalling oversight", writing that "Tolkien's project was as grand and avant-garde as those of Wagner or the Futurists, and his works are as suffused with the spirit of the age as any by Eliot, Joyce, or Hemingway".

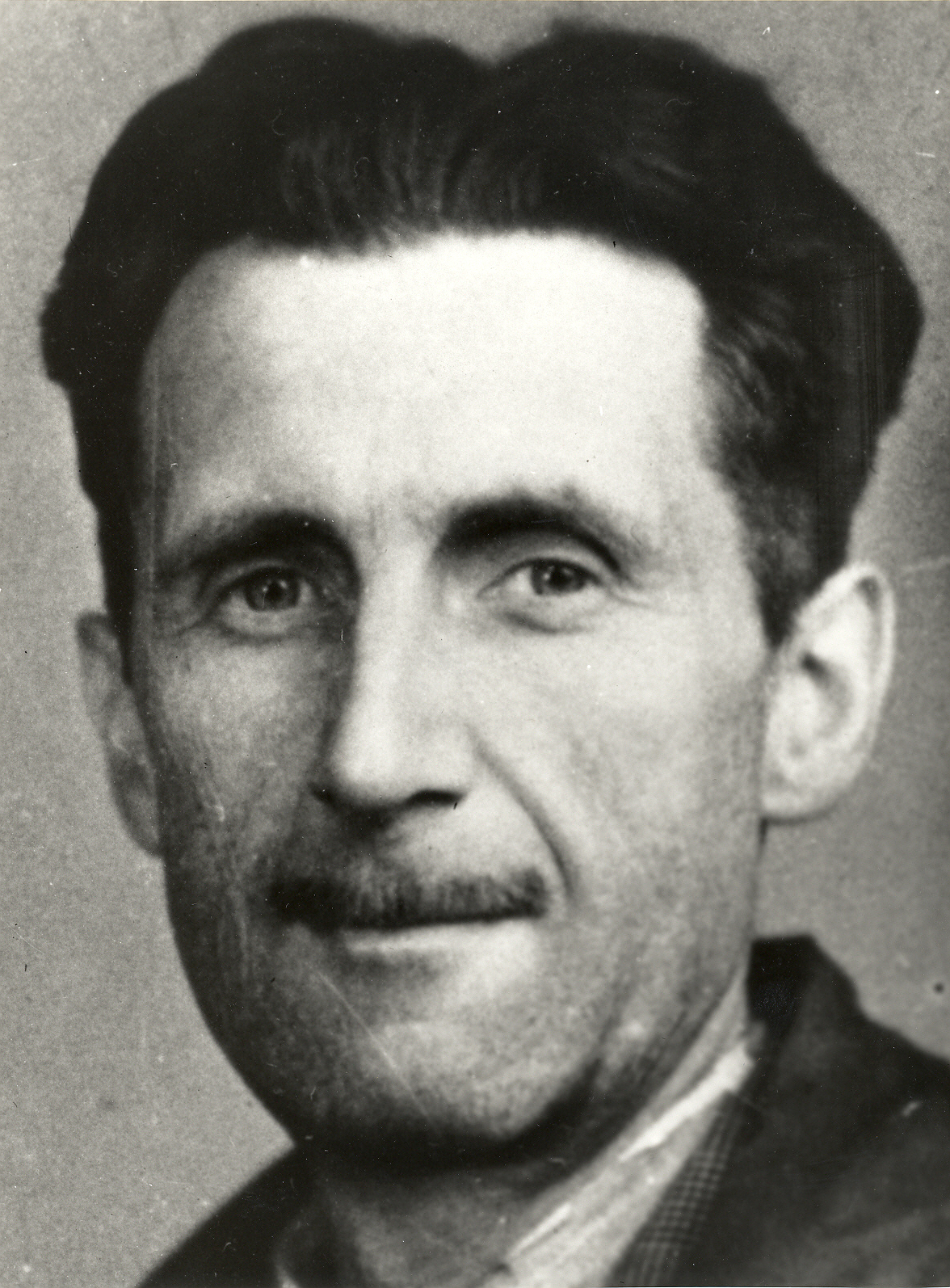
Tolkien's treatments of nature and of evil, and his vision of an empire in decline, have all been likened to the writing of George Orwell by different scholars.

Anna Vaninskaya, in Wiley-Blackwell's 2014 A Companion to J. R. R. Tolkien, looks at Tolkien's modernity in comparison to the literature and culture of the 19th and 20th centuries. She notes that while Tolkien is popularly known as the author of two successful works, The Hobbit and The Lord of the Rings, most of his output, worked on throughout his writing career but unpublished in his lifetime, was his legendarium that lay behind The Silmarillion. She argues that the form and themes of Tolkien's early writings fit into the romantic tradition of writers like William Morris and W. B. Yeats, and have a looser connection with the Celtic Revival and with the Symbolist movement in art. In terms of politics, she compares Tolkien's mature writings with the romantic Little Englandism and anti-statism of 20th century writers like George Orwell and G. K. Chesterton.

Tom Shippey, a Tolkien scholar and like him a philologist, writes that the Shire is certainly where Middle-earth comes nearest to the 20th century, and that the people who had commented that the chapter "The Scouring of the Shire" in The Lord of the Rings was about Tolkien's contemporary England were not wholly wrong. Shippey suggests however that rather than seeing the chapter as an allegory of postwar England, it could be taken as an account of "a society suffering not only from political misrule, but from a strange and generalized crisis of confidence." Shippey draws a parallel with a contemporary work, George Orwell's 1938 novel Coming Up for Air, where England is subjected to a "similar diagnosis" of leaderless inertia.

=== A mythology for an England in decline ===
Flieger notes how dark Tolkien's Silmarillion legendarium is, and that "though it never wavered in intent" it inevitably changed with the changing world of the 20th century, taking on its "color, flavor, and mood". She comments that his "great mythological song" began at the end of the Edwardian era, which it recalled nostalgically; took its shape in the very different era between the wars, which it viewed with "weary disillusionment"; and finally found an audience during yet another era, the Cold War, which it regarded with apprehension. Shippey compares the treatment of evil in The Lord of the Rings with that of disillusioned contemporary authors after the Second World War such as Orwell, William Golding, and Kurt Vonnegut. Flieger too compared him with Orwell, writing that:

If Tolkien's legendarium as we have it now is a mythology for England, it is a song about great power and promise in the throes of decline, racked by dissensions, split by factions, perpetually threatened by war, and perpetually at war with itself. It seems closer to Orwell's 1984 than the furry-footed escapist fantasy that detractors of The Lord of the Rings have characterized that work as being.

John Rateliffe quotes the early Tolkien scholar Paul H. Kocher's 1972 description of Tolkien's plan, to create a mythic prehistory by inserting into The Lord of the Rings:

some forebodings of [Middle-earth's] future which will make Earth what it is today ... he shows the initial steps in a long process of retreat or disappearance by all other intelligent species, which will leave man effectually alone on earth. ... Ents may still be there in our forests, but what forests have we left? The process of extermination is already well under way in the Third Age, and ... Tolkien bitterly deplores its climax today."

Rateliffe writes that Tolkien's "close identification" of Middle-earth and the modern world was present throughout his writing from the start of his career to its end, as was the "elegiac tone"; Tolkien began in 1917 with "lost tales", "the fragmentary sole surviving record of a forgotten history, ... the tragic story of a ruined people".

=== Modern but not a modernist ===
Vaninskaya writes that Tolkien was certainly "a modern writer", but questions whether he was a modernist. She notes that whereas his friend C. S. Lewis publicly engaged with modernism, Tolkien did not. On the other hand, his work was "supremely intertextual", like T. S. Eliot and Ezra Pound, full of allusions, interweaving and juxtaposing styles, modes, and genres, most visibly in The Lord of the Rings. The effect, though, was not, as those authors chose, to present modern life as "fragments in a jagged-edged collage", but "to mold an independent myth of his own", in fact to subcreate a world.

Brian Rosebury, writing in 1992, quotes Tolkien's biographer, Humphrey Carpenter's remark that "Though Tolkien lived in the 20th century, he could hardly be called a modern writer". Rosebury notes that Tolkien belonged to the "lost" generation that contained the killed war poets such as Wilfred Owen; but by 1954–5 when The Lord of the Rings appeared, the fashion was for anti-modernist social realism with writers like Philip Larkin and Kingsley Amis, whose "styles of calculated plainness" Tolkien did not follow. In short, Rosebury writes, Tolkien had a more complex relationship to modernism, which he calls the dominant literary tendency of the 20th century. In his view, The Lord of the Rings is "antagonistic" to the practices and values of modernism, but like many modernist works it uses myth creatively and adaptively. He gives as an example Rainer Maria Rilke's Angels in the Duino Elegies, reworking the archetype of beings like humans but separate from them; the work is quite unlike Tolkien's, but like it throws mortality into sharp relief, and shows death as "a necessary and fitting, as well as a tragic, completion of our destiny". He notes, too, Shippey's analysis of Tolkien's "transformations of motifs" from Shakespeare's Macbeth: the march of the Ents to destroy Isengard, recalling the coming of Birnam Wood to Dunsinane; and the killing of the Witch-king of Angmar, fulfilling the prophecy that "not by the hand of man shall he fall" by bringing about his end with a Hobbit, Merry Brandybuck, and a woman, Éowyn. Rosebury observes, too, that like Rilke and Eliot, Tolkien builds from his "religious intuitions", creating a work that may be suffused with Christianity, but keeps it thoroughly hidden with no trace of allegory; Rosebury likens this to the way that the particularist Catholic novelists such as Graham Greene and Evelyn Waugh gave their attention to human dramas, allowing the reader to notice some power in religious faith.

=== Metanarrative and self-referentiality ===
Metanarrative, including self-referentiality, is a distinctively modernist feature in literature. Tolkien's characters explicitly speak about storytelling, and are conscious of the metanarrative fact that they are in a story. On the stairs of the dangerous pass of Cirith Ungol, as they are about to descend into Mordor, very likely to their deaths, Frodo and Sam discuss the nature of story. Sam says "We're in one, of course, but I mean put into words, you know ... read out of a great big book with red and black letters, years and years afterwards. And people will say 'Let's hear about Frodo and the Ring!". Frodo answers "Why Sam ... to hear you somehow makes me as merry as if the story were already written". Verlyn Flieger writes that this is "the most self-referential and post-modern moment in the entire book", since it constitutes the book itself looking both back at its own creation, and forward to the printed book that the reader is holding. Kullmann and Siepmann comment that the laughter "is obviously due to the liberating function of literature." Mary Bowman comments that it "is perhaps not surprising to find such a conversation, with its mood-altering impact, in a work written by a man who spent his professional career, as well as a good deal of his leisure time from boyhood, reading, teaching, editing, and writing about narratives of various sorts (not to mention creating them)."

=== Sharing qualities with modernism ===
Rosebury states that Tolkien's writing shares several qualities with modernism, as well as having a modern novelistic "realism"; but the thing that keeps it from being called modernist is that it lacks irony. In particular, he writes, Tolkien is never ironic about value, nor about the literary text itself, both hallmarks of modernism; Patrick Curry, writing in A Companion to J. R. R. Tolkien, concurs with this. Shippey notes that Tolkien can all the same make use of irony, as when Denethor despairs "on the brink of victory", having been misled by looking in the Palantír. Shippey goes on to describe The Lord of the Rings as "a profoundly ironic work, so much so that I do not think we have even yet got to the bottom of its many ironies."

The Lord of the Rings is sharply aware of people's moral imperfection, and all the characters, "even the wisest", understand only a fraction of their world, but the work is not radically pessimistic about the possibility of knowing anything. Rosebury notes that one can see that modernism remains influential in the fact that saying a work is not ironic or self-referential can be taken as disparagement, whereas in the Romantic period, works such as Byron's or Goethe's were basically always earnest. Rosebury concludes by suggesting that the "elements of neo-romantic earnestness in Tolkien may ... come to seem a welcome variant" of modernism, rather than a failure to adjust to it.

== See also ==
- Tolkien and Edwardian adventure stories
- Tolkien's modern sources

== Sources ==
- Bowman, Mary R. (October 2006). "The Story Was Already Written: Narrative Theory in "The Lord of the Rings"". Narrative. 14 (3): 272–293. doi:10.1353/nar.2006.0010. JSTOR 20107391. S2CID 162244172.
- Carpenter, Humphrey (1978) [1977]. Tolkien: A Biography. Unwin. pp. 24, 38, 39, 41, 60, 80, 89, 91, 114–115, 122. ISBN 0-04-928039-2.
- Carpenter, Humphrey (1981) [1978]. The Inklings: CS Lewis, JRR Tolkien, Charles Williams and their Friends. Unwin. ISBN 978-0-04809-011-9.
- Curry, Patrick (2020) [2014]. "The Critical Response to Tolkien's Fiction". In Lee, Stuart D. (ed.). A Companion to J. R. R. Tolkien (PDF). Wiley Blackwell. pp. 369–388. doi:10.1002/9781118517468.ch25. ISBN 978-1-11965-602-9.
- Fimi, Dimitra (2010) [2008]. Tolkien, Race, and Cultural History: from Fairies to Hobbits. Palgrave Macmillan. ISBN 978-0-230-27284-2. OCLC 619082411.
- Flieger, Verlyn (2005). Interrupted Music: The Making of Tolkien's Mythology. Kent State University Press. ISBN 978-0-87338-824-5.
- Honegger, Thomas; Weinreich, Frank, eds. (2006). Tolkien and Modernity. Volume 1: ISBN 978-3-905703-02-3 Volume 2: ISBN 978-3-905703-03-0
- Jenkyns, Richard (28 January 2002). "Bored of the Rings". The New Republic.
- Kocher, Paul (1972). Master of Middle-earth: The Achievement of J.R.R. Tolkien. Houghton Mifflin. OCLC 1067790142.
- Kullmann, Thomas; Siepmann, Dirk (2021). Tolkien as a Literary Artist. Cham: Palgrave Macmillan. ISBN 978-3-030-69298-8.
- Moorcock, Michael (1987). "5. "Epic Pooh"". Wizardry and Wild Romance: A study of epic fantasy. Victor Gollancz. p. 181. ISBN 0-575-04324-5. Archived from the original on 24 March 2008 – via RevolutionSF.
- Mortimer, Patchen (2005). "Tolkien and Modernism". Tolkien Studies. 2 (1): 113–129. doi:10.1353/tks.2005.0025. ISSN 1547-3163. S2CID 170640541.
- Muir, Edwin (22 August 1954). "Review: The Fellowship of the Ring". The Observer.
- Nicolay, Theresa Freda (2014). Tolkien and the modernists: literary responses to the dark new days of the 20th century. McFarland. ISBN 978-0-7864-7898-9. OCLC 876000417.
- Rateliff, John D. (2006). "'And All the Days of Her Life Are Forgotten': 'The Lord of the Rings' as Mythic Prehistory". In Hammond, Wayne G.; Scull, Christina (eds.). The Lord of the Rings, 1954-2004: Scholarship in Honor of Richard E. Blackwelder. Marquette University Press. pp. 67–100. ISBN 0-87462-018-X. OCLC 298788493.
- Reid, Robin Anne (2018). "[Review] Tolkien Among the Moderns (2015), ed. by Ralph C. Wood". Journal of Tolkien Research. 6 (1). Article 2.
- Riggs, Don (2015). "[Review] Tolkien and the Modernists: Literary Responses to the Dark New Days of the 20th Century by Theresa Freda Nicolay". Journal of the Fantastic in the Arts. 26 (3): 610–613.
- Rosebury, Brian (2003) [1992]. Tolkien: A Cultural Phenomenon. Palgrave. ISBN 978-1403-91263-3.
- Shippey, Tom (2005) [1982]. The Road to Middle-Earth: How J. R. R. Tolkien Created a New Mythology (Third ed.). HarperCollins. ISBN 978-0-261-10275-0.
- Shippey, Tom (2001). J. R. R. Tolkien: Author of the Century. HarperCollins. ISBN 978-0261-10401-3.
- Shippey, Tom (2016). "The Curious Case of Denethor and the Palantír, Once More". Mallorn (57): 6–9.
- Shulevitz, Judith (22 April 2001). "Hobbits in Hollywood". The New York Times.
- Snyder, Christopher A. (December 2017). "Tolkien among the Moderns ed. by Ralph C. Wood (review)". Christianity and Literature. 67 (1): 241–243. doi:10.1177/0148333116687251.
- Tolkien, J. R. R. (1954). The Two Towers. The Lord of the Rings. Boston: Houghton Mifflin. OCLC 1042159111.
- Turner, Jenny (15 November 2001). "Reasons for Liking Tolkien". London Review of Books. 23 (22).
- Vaninskaya, Anna (2020) [2014]. "Modernity: Tolkien and His Contemporaries". In Lee, Stuart D. (ed.). A Companion to J. R. R. Tolkien. Wiley Blackwell. pp. 350–366. ISBN 978-1119656029.
- Wagner, Vit (16 April 2007). "Tolkien proves he's still the king". Toronto Star. Archived from the original on 9 March 2011.
- Wilson, Edmund (14 April 1956). "Oo, Those Awful Orcs! A review of The Fellowship of the Ring". The Nation. JRRVF.
- Wood, Ralph C. (2015). Tolkien among the Moderns. University of Notre Dame Press. ISBN 978-0-268-15854-5.
