= Tolkien: A Cultural Phenomenon =

Book of literary criticism of Tolkien

- Cover of 6-chapter edition, 2003
- Author: Brian Rosebury
- Subject: J. R. R. Tolkien's Middle-earth writings
- Genre: Literary criticism
- Publisher: Palgrave Macmillan
- Publication date: 2003
- Media type: Paperback
- Pages: 246
- ISBN: 978-1403-91263-3

Tolkien: A Cultural Phenomenon is a 2003 book of literary criticism by Brian Rosebury about the English author and philologist J. R. R. Tolkien and his writings on his fictional world of Middle-earth, especially The Lord of the Rings. A shorter version of the book, Tolkien: A Critical Assessment, appeared in 1992. Rosebury examines how Tolkien imagined Middle-earth, how he achieved the aesthetic effect he was seeking, his place among twentieth century writers, and how his work has been retold and imitated by other authors and in other media, most notably for film by Peter Jackson.

Other Tolkien scholars have praised the book, noting that it raised the standard of Tolkien criticism, and that it made the point that readers have to be delighted with Middle-earth so as to care that it is not destroyed by the Dark Lord Sauron. In particular, Jane Chance comments on Rosebury's demonstration of the high quality of Tolkien's work, including his comparison of Tolkien's writing with that of twentieth-century modernists. Tom Shippey finds the book a compelling analysis.

== Context ==
J. R. R. Tolkien's fantasy writings about Middle-earth, especially The Hobbit and The Lord of the Rings, have become extremely popular, and have exerted considerable influence since their publication, but acceptance by the literary establishment has been slower. Nevertheless, academic studies on Tolkien's works have been appearing at an increasing pace since the mid-1980s, prompting a measure of literary re-evaluation of his work.

Brian Rosebury is a lecturer in the humanities at the University of Central Lancashire. He has specialised in Tolkien, in literary aesthetics, and later in moral and political philosophy.

== Book ==
=== Publication history ===
A short version of the book (167 pages, four chapters, paperback) was first published by Macmillan in 1992 under the title Tolkien: A Critical Assessment.

The full version of the book (246 pages, six chapters, paperback) was published by Palgrave Macmillan in 2003 under the title Tolkien: A Cultural Phenomenon. It has been translated into Italian.

=== Synopsis ===
Diagram of Brian Rosebury's analysis of The Lord of the Rings as a combined Quest (to destroy the Ring) and Journey (as a series of Tableaux of places in Middle-earth); the two support each other

The book begins by examining how Tolkien imagined Middle-earth in The Lord of the Rings, and how he achieved the aesthetic effect he was seeking. Rosebury shows that Tolkien does two things simultaneously: he builds up a detailed picture of Middle-earth, on a journey through a series of tableaux; and goes on a quest to destroy the Ring. The tableaux create places realistic enough for readers to love and wish to save; the quest saves the Middle-earth that is being created as the reader moves through it.

Rosebury then explores Tolkien's long career writing both prose and poetry, from the start of war in 1914 to his death in 1973. The fourth chapter briefly situates Tolkien in the twentieth century literary scene, contrasting his work with Modernism and describing it as not ignorant of that movement but actually antagonistic to it.

The later edition added two new chapters to the book. The first looks at Tolkien as a thinker within the history of ideas: it examines in turn how his writing relates to the times in which he lived, how his work has been used to support various ideologies, and the underlying coherence of his thinking. The other chapter, which gives its title to the book, looks at the "afterlife" of his work, and how it has variously been retold in film and other media, assimilated to various genres, imitated by "thousands" of other authors, and, despite Tolkien's stated opinion that The Lord of the Rings was "quite unsuitable for 'dramatization'", adapted, most notably for film by Peter Jackson; Rosebury considers how well this succeeds in conveying the message of the book.

== Reception ==
Jane Chance, a Tolkien scholar, writes that the refusal by some critics to accept that Tolkien is a major writer has "consistently annoyed Tolkien readers ...over the past twenty-five years", but that Tom Shippey and Rosebury have attempted "to persuade these nay-sayers". She notes that Rosebury strategically uses Shippey to begin his book, praising him but saying that he doesn't clinch the argument that Tolkien's works are "of high quality". Rosebury then, she writes, applies his expertise as seen in his 1988 book Art and Desire: A Study in the Aesthetics of Fiction, to demonstrate Tolkien's aesthetic skill. She contrasts Shippey's comparison of Tolkien with fantasy authors from George Orwell and William Golding to T. H. White and C. S. Lewis, with Rosebury's search for parallels among the Modernists such as Marcel Proust, James Joyce, and T. S. Eliot. Claire Buck however comments in the J. R. R. Tolkien Encyclopedia that this brings up the problematic definition of what "modern" is according to the same critics who thought Tolkien "a peripheral figure".

Nancy-Lou Patterson, reviewing the first version of the book in Mythlore, notes that Tolkien criticism had been distinctly "uneven" at best, but British critics such as Rosebury were improving the standard. She liked his characterisation of "Tolkien's descriptive gifts as possessing 'a certain sensuous precision, distinctive of Tolkien'". She agreed with Rosebury's assertion that The Lord of the Rings works not because of its basis in Christianity but for its emotional appeal of a powerfully imagined but essentially good world that treats evil as the absence of good. In her view, Rosebury successfully defends The Lord of the Rings, even if she wouldn't call The Hobbit a minor work.

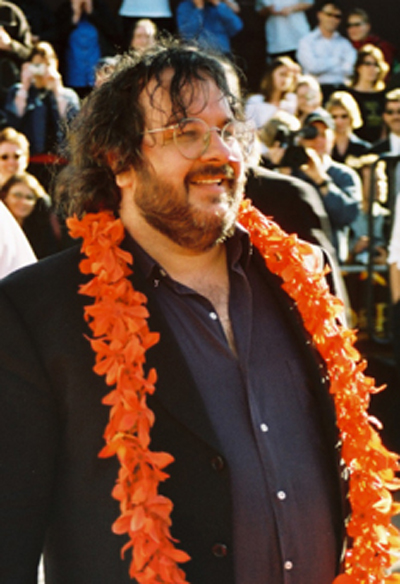
The 2003 version of the book adds a substantial discussion of how well Peter Jackson (pictured) captured the subtlety of Tolkien's text with his film version of The Lord of the Rings.

The Tolkien scholar Douglas A. Anderson, reviewing the work for the literary magazine VII, notes that this was a retitled edition of Rosebury's 1992 Tolkien: A Critical Assessment, with two "significant" chapters added. He finds especially valuable Rosebury's analysis of Tolkien's style in the first three chapters; and he admires the two chapters on Tolkien's relationship with the modern world, including his views on religion, politics, and the environment. He finds disappointing Tolkien's treatment of The Hobbit as merely "a dry run for The Lord of the Rings". Anderson comments, too, that Rosebury is "less rigorously critical" when discussing Peter Jackson's film interpretation of Tolkien than when analysing the literature. Overall, however, Anderson finds the book "a shrewd and engaging academic study"; he notes that its traditional literary approach usefully complements Tom Shippey's "excellent" philological approach. He calls the book's prose "clear and direct..., without jargon", stating that Rosebury builds a cogent case for Tolkien "as a significant—though flawed—twentieth century writer".

Tom Shippey calls the book a compelling analysis, and finds Rosebury's explanation of how Tolkien wove free will, moral choice, and creativity into Middle-earth "especially convincing". He admired the account of Tolkien's narrative and descriptive skill, and thought Rosebury's chapter on Peter Jackson's film adaptation the "best available" at that time.

Christopher Garbowski, in the J. R. R. Tolkien Encyclopedia, writes that Rosebury looks at the humanistic implications of eucatastrophe, quoting him as saying that "the reader must be delighted in Middle-earth in order to care that Sauron does not lay it desolate". The eucatastrophe is convincing because "its optimism is emotionally consonant with the work's pervasive sense of a universe hospitable to the humane." Allan Turner comments in the same work that Rosebury rejects the unsupported assertions of archaising and "wrenched syntax" by critics like Catharine Stimpson, and that Rosebury pointed out that Tolkien used a plain descriptive style, demonstrably favouring the "familiar phrasal verbs 'have on' and 'get off' .. to the slightly more literary 'wear' and 'dismount'".

== See also ==
- Women in The Lord of the Rings

== Sources ==
- Anderson, Douglas A. (2005). "Review". VII: Journal of the Marion E. Wade Center. 22: 114–116. JSTOR 45297096.
- Buck, Claire (2013) [2007]. "Literary Context, Twentieth Century". In Drout, Michael D. C. (ed.). J.R.R. Tolkien Encyclopedia. Routledge. pp. 363–366. ISBN 978-0-415-86511-1.
- Chance, Jane (2005). "Tolkien: A Cultural Phenomenon (review)". Tolkien Studies. 2 (1): 262–265. doi:10.1353/tks.2005.0010. ISSN 1547-3163. S2CID 170564123.
- Garbowski, Christopher (2013) [2007]. "Eucatastrophe". In Drout, Michael D. C. (ed.). J.R.R. Tolkien Encyclopedia. Routledge. pp. 176–177. ISBN 978-0-415-86511-1.
- Lobdell, Jared (2013) [2007]. "Criticism of Tolkien, Twentieth Century". In Michael D. C. Drout (ed.). J. R. R. Tolkien Encyclopedia. Routledge. pp. 109–110. ISBN 978-0-415-96942-0.
- Patterson, Nancy-Lou (1997). "Reviews: Sensuous Precision Brian Rosebury, Tolkien — A Critical Assessment". Mythlore. 21 (4 (82, Winter 1997)). article 8.
- Rosebury, Brian (2003) [1992]. Tolkien: A Cultural Phenomenon. Palgrave Macmillan. ISBN 978-1403-91263-3.
- Turner, Allan (2013) [2007]. "Prose Style". In Drout, Michael D. C. (ed.). J.R.R. Tolkien Encyclopedia. Routledge. pp. 545–546. ISBN 978-0-415-86511-1.
