= Anna Vaninskaya =

Scholar of literature

Anna Vaninskaya is a Professor of Literary and Cultural History at the University of Edinburgh. She is known as a Tolkien scholar and has published on William Morris and other Victorian era and 20th century writers. She has contributed to the Wiley-Blackwell A Companion to J. R. R. Tolkien.

She has won the 2011 Choice Outstanding Academic Title award and the 2021 Mythopoeic Society's award for Mythopoeic Scholarship.

== Life ==
Anna Vaninskaya grew up in Russia and America before moving to Britain. She studied English literature at the University of Denver, where she gained her bachelor's and master's degrees. She won a Marshall Scholarship to the University of Oxford, where she earned her PhD.

She began her academic career as a postdoctoral fellow at the Cambridge Victorian Studies Group; she was a junior fellow of King's College, Cambridge.

Vaninskaya then became a lecturer in English Literature at the University of Edinburgh. Later, she was made a fellow of the Edinburgh Futures Institute, and Professor of Literary and Cultural History at the university. She has written more than 40 book chapters and journal articles on modern literature, including on William Morris, E. R. Eddison, Lord Dunsany, G. K. Chesterton, George Orwell and J. R. R. Tolkien. She is one of the editors of the Journal of William Morris Studies, the Bloomsbury Academic Perspectives on Fantasy series, and the Victorian literature section of Oxford Bibliographies Online. She created the Scotland-Russia: Cultural Encounters Since 1900 archive. She studies Anglo-Russian literary relations of the same period.

== Reception ==
=== William Morris and the Idea of Community: Romance, History and Propaganda ===
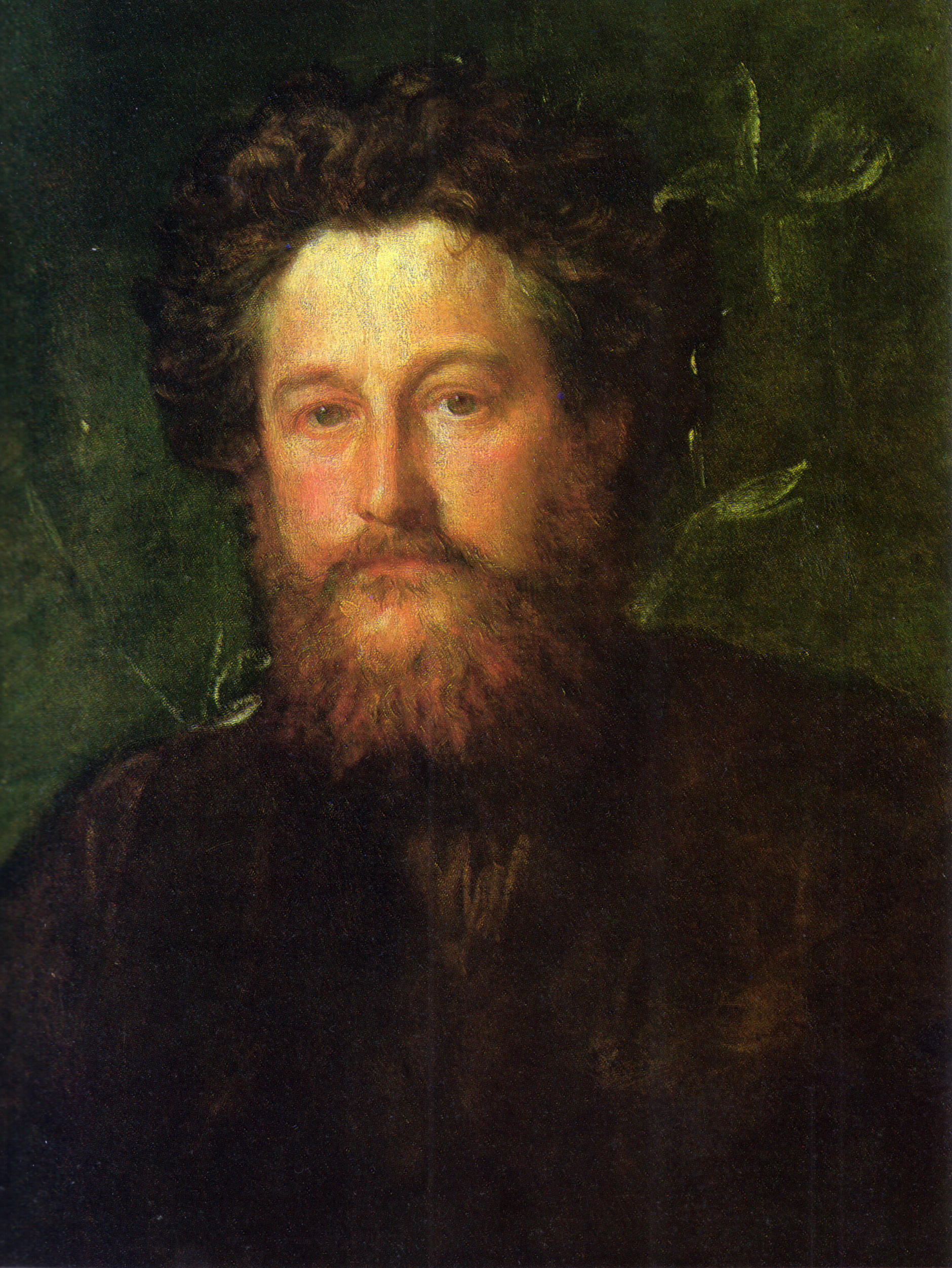
William Morris by George Frederic Watts, 1870

Ben Moore, reviewing William Morris and the Idea of Community: Romance, History and Propaganda in Modern Language Review, writes that Vaninskaya's study is well-researched, with the figure of Morris tying together her three threads of romance, history, and propaganda. The purpose of the book is to examine how socialists of the period viewed the idea of community life. Moore recommends the book to people interested in the history of socialism, and students of Morris. He finds the breadth of the study "impressive" but would have liked more "speculative analysis" of the puzzles that Vaninskaya's study reveals.

=== Fantasies of Time and Death: Dunsany, Eddison, Tolkien ===
Sarah R. Waters, reviewing Fantasies of Time and Death: Dunsany, Eddison, Tolkien for Mythlore, writes that Vaninskaya deliberately looks at all three authors in their own right, avoiding the usual Inkling influence approach. She states that Vaninskaya shows that the authors all addressed questions of time and death, and uses Shakespeare's Hamlet and his Sonnet 18 to illuminate their approaches. Waters concludes that the book " does what Lewis argued the best literary criticism ought to do, it 'lead[s] in' rather than taking 'you out of the literature'."

Kris Swank, reviewing the book in Journal of Tolkien Research, writes that it is an academic work that places Tolkien and death in the canon of fantasy, alongside Dunsany, Eddison, and others such as Hope Mirrlees and forerunners like William Morris and George MacDonald. Swank finds the study "erudite" and the chapters on the three authors "admirable", but feels that they do not "hang together as a unified monograph". All the same, she writes, scholars will find much to enjoy, especially in the Tolkien chapter.

=== London Through Russian Eyes, 1896–1914 ===
Michael Hughes, reviewing London Through Russian Eyes, 1896–1914 for the Slavonic and East European Review, writes that the collection offers "a rich set of readings that show how a number of Russian journalists and writers presented life in London to their readers back home". with an "excellent critical apparatus" and a "valuable" introduction. Hughes comments that a little more context on Russian radical thought would have been helpful, but that the attitudes in the book are "vividly outlined" and the sources are "a fascinating collection" which Vaninskaya has "meticulously edited".

== Awards and distinctions ==
Vaninskaya's book William Morris and the Idea of Community: Romance, History and Propaganda, 1880-1914 won the 2011 Choice Outstanding Academic Title award.

Her book Fantasies of Time and Death: Dunsany, Eddison, Tolkien won the Mythopoeic Society's 2021 award for Mythopoeic Scholarship.

== Books ==
- 2010 William Morris and the idea of community: romance, history and propaganda, 1880-1914, Edinburgh University Press.
- 2020 Fantasies of Time and Death: Dunsany, Eddison, Tolkien, Palgrave Macmillan.
- 2022 London Through Russian Eyes, 1896-1914: An Anthology of Foreign Correspondence (editor, translator). Boydell and Brewer.
