= List of weapons and armour in Middle-earth =

List of weapons and armour in J. R. R. Tolkien's Middle-earth

The weapons and armour of Middle-earth are all those mentioned J. R. R. Tolkien's Middle-earth fantasy writings, such as The Hobbit, The Lord of the Rings and The Silmarillion.

Tolkien modelled his fictional warfare on the Ancient and Early Medieval periods of history. His depiction of weapons and armour particularly reflect Northern European culture as seen in Beowulf and the Norse sagas. Tolkien established this relationship in The Fall of Gondolin, the first story in his legendarium to be written. In this story, the Elves of Gondolin use the mail armour, swords, shields, spears, axes and bows of Northern European warfare. In Tolkien's writings, such Medieval weapons and armour are used by his fictional races, including Elves, Dwarves, Men, Hobbits, and Orcs.

As in his sources, Tolkien's characters often gave names to their weapons, sometimes with runic inscriptions to show they are magical and have their own history and power.

== Terminology ==
Tolkien devised several constructed languages with terms for types of weapons.

- Sword: Noldorin Sindarin: magl, magol, (Note: Tolkien 1987, p. 371) North Sindarin magor, (Note: Tolkien 1994, p. 234.) Quenya: makil, macil. Specific types of sword were named lango (broad sword), eket, ecet (short sword), and lhang (cutlass, sword). (Note: Tolkien 1987, p. 367)
- Dagger, knife: Noldorin Sindarin: sigil, Quenya: cirma, sicil (Note: Tolkien 1987, p. 385)
- Axe: North Sindarin: hathol, Quenya: pelekko (Hooker notes the similarity of the Greek πέλεκυς pélekys: double-headed axe), Khuzdul: bark, pl. baruk
- Spear: Quenya: hatal also nehte (Note: Tolkien 1987, p. 355)
- Bow: Noldorin Sindarin: peng also poetically cû ("arch"), Quenya: quinga. (Note: Tolkien 1987, p. 366)
- Arrow: Quenya: pilin, pl. pilindi (Note: The Etymologies under the root PÍLIM-.) (Note: Hooker notes the similarity of the Latin pīlum [javelin, throwing spear], with cognates in the Old High German [pfīl, meaning arrow], Modern German [Pfeil], Old English [pīl], late Old Norse [píla], and the Dutch [pijl].)

== Types ==
=== Swords ===
Swords symbolized physical prowess in battle for Tolkien, following Northern European culture. Tolkien writes that Elves and Dwarves produced the best swords (and other war gear) and that Elvish swords glowed blue in the presence of Orcs. Elves generally used straight swords while Orcs generally used curved swords. Both races have exceptions: Egalmoth of Gondolin used a curved sword and the Uruk-hai of Isengard used short, broad blades. Tolkien often mentions the use of shields together with one-handed swords.

=== Knives ===
Knives are mentioned in Tolkien's works, sometimes as backup weapons—such as the unnamed long knife of Legolas the archer. However, some individual knives are given more significance through naming (e.g. Sting, see below). In "The Scouring of the Shire", Saruman attempts to stab Frodo with a knife, but is foiled by the mithril shirt worn under his jacket. Shortly afterwards Saruman's throat was fatally cut with a knife borne by Wormtongue. (Note: Tolkien 1955, book 6 ch. 8 "The Scouring of the Shire")

For The Lord of the Rings film trilogy, Legolas possessed twin fighting knives carried in sheaths near his quiver.

==== Special types of knife ====
There are some special types of knife in Tolkien's fiction which do not have formal names, but nevertheless play important roles in the plot.

===== Morgul-blades =====
The Witch-king of Angmar, leader of the Nazgûl, used a magical dagger called a "Morgul-blade" to wound Frodo Baggins at Weathertop. The dark magic of the knife gravely affects Frodo's well-being, threatening to turn him into a wraith, especially because its detachable point migrated in Frodo's body for more than two weeks before it could be extracted, thus causing great damage. Recurring ill effects from the wound contribute to Frodo's eventual departure to Valinor. (Note: Tolkien 1954a, pp. 208, 210; Tolkien 1955, p. 333) According to the J.R.R. Tolkien Encyclopedia, the weapon may owe something to the tradition of the "elf-shot" found in Old English medical texts and charms, where it denotes illnesses of presumed supernatural origin.

===== Barrow-blades =====
Tom Bombadil recovers four magical daggers, forged by the Men of Westernesse to fight the powers of Angmar, from a tomb guarded by the Barrow-wight. After opening the barrow and freeing the hobbits, Tom Bombadil gives them the weapons, saying "Old knives are long enough as swords for hobbit-people". (Note: Tolkien 1954a, book 1, ch. 8 "Fog on the Barrow-downs") One of these "Barrow-blades" – that given to Merry Brandybuck – proves instrumental in bringing about the death of the Witch-king. (Note: Tolkien 1955, book 5, ch. 6 "The Battle of the Pelennor Fields", p. 117: "No other blade, not though mightier hands had wielded it, would have dealt that foe a wound so bitter, cleaving the undead flesh, breaking the spell that knit his unseen sinews to his will.")

The daggers had varying fates. The Witch-king broke Frodo's blade at the Ford of Bruinen. Sam Gamgee left his beside Frodo in Cirith Ungol; it was returned to Gandalf, along with Frodo's mithril mail-shirt, by the Mouth of Sauron. (Note: Tolkien 1955, book 5, ch. 10 "The Black Gate Opens") Pippin Took used his dagger in the Battle of the Black Gate to slay a Troll. Merry's blade was destroyed during his attack on the Witch-king.

=== Axes ===
Battle axes are especially favoured by Dwarves in Tolkien's writings; Gimli uses the battle cry: Axes of the Dwarves! The Dwarves are upon you! (Khuzdul: Baruk Khazâd! Khazâd ai-mênu!). (Note: Tolkien 1954, "The Battle of Helm's Deep") For The Lord of the Rings film trilogy, Gimli the Dwarf was assigned various axes of different makes during the course of the films.

=== Bows and arrows ===
Bows of different sizes and construction are featured in Tolkien's works. Elves of Lothlórien, Men, and Uruk-hai used longbows, while Elves of Mirkwood and Orcs of Mordor used smaller ones. These bows are said to be made of wood, horn and even steel.

The most famous bowman in Tolkien's stories of the First Age of Middle-earth is the Elf Beleg; his bow was named Belthronding, and his arrow Dailir. Infamously Curufin, a lord of the Noldor, attempts to shoot the Elf-princess Lúthien with the bow of his brother Celegorm. His first arrow is intercepted by Huan; Beren attempts to intercept the second shot, and is wounded. (Note: Tolkien 1977, ch. 19 "Of Beren and Luthien")

In The Lord of the Rings, set in the late Third Age, a bow is the main weapon of Legolas, the Elf-member of the Fellowship of the Ring. When the Fellowship meet Galadriel, she gives Legolas a new bow. He later uses it to shoot all the way across the great river Anduin and bring down an airborne Nazgûl.

The Lord of the Rings film trilogy assigns a bow to Aragorn and crossbows to the Uruk-hai. However, in Tolkien's writings Aragorn is armed only with the sword Andúril, and crossbows are only mentioned in connection to hunting by Númenoreans in their lost homeland of Númenor. (Note: Tolkien 2021, ch. 13 "Of the Land and Beasts of Númenor")

Sometimes individual arrows are given special mention in Tolkien's works. In The Hobbit, the Black Arrow was a royal heirloom used by Bard the Bowman to kill the dragon Smaug. (Note: Tolkien 1937, ch. 14 "Fire and Water") In The Lord of the Rings, the Red Arrow was a token used by Gondor to summon its allies in time of need. (Note: Tolkien 1955, p. 72; Tolkien 1980, p. 364, 411) In the Lord of the Rings film trilogy, the Red Arrow is omitted and its role is conflated with the Beacons of Gondor.

Hobbits "shot well with the bow". (Note: Tolkien 1954a, Prologue §1) The Shire sent archers to the battles of the Fall of Arnor. (Note: Tolkien 1955, appendix A part I(iii))

=== Armour ===
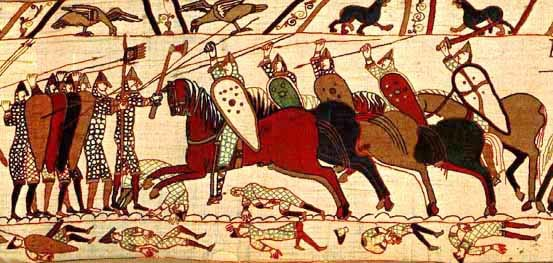
Tolkien stated that the styles of the Bayeux Tapestry fitted the Rohirrim "well enough". (Note: Carpenter 2023, #211 "The Rohirrim were not 'mediaeval', in our sense. The styles of the Bayeux Tapestry (made in England) fit them well enough, if one remembers that the kind of tennis-nets [the] soldiers seem to have on are only a clumsy conventional sign for chainmail of small rings")

Body armour in Tolkien's fiction is mainly in the form of mail or scale shirts, in keeping with Ancient and Early Medieval periods of history. In contrast, the Lord of the Rings film trilogy features later medieval plate armour suits. These kinds of plate armour are not found in Tolkien's writings, but plate does appear in the form of individual pieces such as vambraces (forearm guards) or greaves (leg and shin guards). As with other items of war, Elves and Dwarves produced the best armour. The mail shirt forged by Dwarves from the fictional metal mithril appears in The Hobbit and The Lord of the Rings, worn in turn by the protagonists Bilbo and Frodo Baggins.

In Letter 211 of The Letters of J.R.R. Tolkien, the author compared the war-gear of the Rohirrim to the Bayeux Tapestry, made during the Norman Conquest of Anglo-Saxon England.

=== Helmets ===
Battle helmets are commonly used by virtually all races in Tolkien's writings. The Rohirrim were partly modelled on the Anglo-Saxons, who wore elaborate helmets; Éomer's helmet had a long white horse-tail panache that trailed in the wind. The Crown of Gondor was a jewelled battle-helmet; Aragorn received it at his coronation. Frodo Baggins and Sam Gamgee use Orc-helmets as part of their disguise in Mordor.

In the First Age, Dwarves made dragon-helms, which were said to protect against Dragons. The most famous of these was the Dragon-helm of Dor-lómin.

The Second Age was dominated by Númenor. The Númenórean helmet, the karma, reached particularly elaborate forms. Those of the Uinendili, a guild of mariners, were "made of overlapping plates of metal, the 'fish-crest' of leather embossed and coloured". (Note: Tolkien 1980, inside rear dust-jacket) Tolkien's coloured drawing of the karma of a Uinendili captain features on the cover of Unfinished Tales.

== Named items ==
Tolkien emulated his Northern European mythological and literary sources in having his characters give names to their weapons, marking these out as important aspects of character and sometimes as ancient heirlooms. Named weapons in Medieval literature include Hrunting and Nægling in Beowulf, Tyrfing in the Elder Edda and Gram in the Völsunga saga. The items illustrate the passage of time and the transfer of power or fate to their future bearers.

=== Named swords and knives ===
==== Anglachel ====
Anglachel (Sindarin: Iron of the Flaming Star) was a sword forged of meteoritic iron by Eöl the Dark Elf, given to Thingol King of Doriath as a fee for leave to dwell in Nan Elmoth. It could cleave all earth-delved iron. Later wielded by Beleg Strongbow and ultimately Túrin; (Note: Tolkien 1977, "Of Turin Turambar", Index "Anglachel"; Tolkien 1980, p. 148, 419) Anglachel was reforged and renamed Gurthang (Sindarin: Iron of Death (Note: Tolkien 1980, p. 443)). Túrin used Gurthang to kill Glaurung, the Father of Dragons, and later used the sword to take his own life in recompense for the accidental slaying of Beleg and the unjust slaying of Brandir. The stories endow the sword with a personality; Melian the Maia perceived malice in it as it was given to Beleg Cúthalion, and the elf Gwindor observed that Anglachel (so named then) seemed to mourn the death of Beleg at the hand of his friend Túrin by Anglachel itself. Túrin asked the sword whether it would slay him swiftly if he cast himself on its point, and it responded at length (the only instance of Gurthang speaking with voice). The depiction of the sword was influenced by that of the sword of the Finnish character Kullervo in the Kalevala.

==== Angrist ====
Angrist (Sindarin: Iron-cleaver (Note: Tolkien 1977, Index "Angrist")) was a knife made by the great weaponsmith Telchar of Nogrod, and borne by Curufin. Beren, who had taken it from Curufin, used it to cut a magical Silmaril jewel out of Morgoth's Iron Crown; as Beren attempted to remove another, the knife snapped. (Note: Tolkien 1977, "Of Beren and Luthien") In the earliest version of Beren's story in The Book of Lost Tales, he uses an ordinary household knife; the element of Curufin's involvement in Beren's affairs came later. (Note: Tolkien 1984b, "The Tale of Tinúviel)

==== Anguirel ====
Anguirel (Sindarin: Iron of Eternity) is the sword forged by Eöl the Dark Elf, similar to Anglachel which was given to Thingol of Doriath in The Silmarillion. It was the mate of Anglachel, was made of the same meteoritic iron, and had the same physical properties and capabilities as Anglachel, but there is no evidence of sentience in Anguirel. Anguirel was kept by Eöl until it was stolen by his son, Maeglin. (Note: Tolkien 1977, "Of Turin Turambar")

==== Aranrúth ====
Aranrúth (Sindarin: King's Ire (Note: Tolkien 1977, Index "Aranruth")) is the sword wielded by King Thingol of Doriath in The Silmarillion. (Note: Tolkien 1977, "Of Turin Turambar", Akallabeth; Tolkien 1980, p. 171) Later the sword of the Kings of Númenor.

==== Glamdring ====
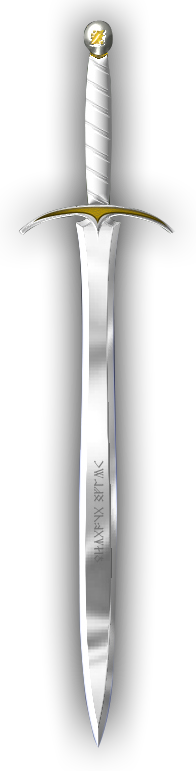
An artistic representation of the sword Glamdring based on its description in The Lord of the Rings

Glamdring (Sindarin: Foe-hammer (Note: Tolkien 1937, ch. 3, "A Short Rest"; ch. 18, "The Return Journey")) is a sword in The Hobbit, The Lord of the Rings and Unfinished Tales forged in the First Age by the High Elves of the hidden city of Gondolin. It belonged first to Turgon, the King of Gondolin. Thousands of years later, in T.A. 2941, Gandalf discovered it among the hoard of the three trolls in The Hobbit, and he carried it throughout his journeys with Bilbo Baggins and the Fellowship of the Ring. It was the mate of Orcrist, and like Orcrist would glow blue whenever orcs were nearby. Glamdring was nicknamed "Beater" by the goblins of the Misty Mountains. (Note: Tolkien 1937, ch 2 "Roast Mutton") (Note: Tolkien 1954a, book 2, ch. 3, "The Ring Goes South") (Note: Tolkien 1954a, book 2, ch. 5, "The Bridge of Khazad-dûm") (Note: Tolkien 1954, book 3, ch. 5, "The White Rider")

==== Gurthang ====
See Anglachel

==== Gúthwinë ====
Gúthwinë (Old English: gúð-wine Battle Friend) is the sword wielded by Éomer, third marshal of the Riddermark in The Lord of the Rings. (Note: Tolkien 1954, p. 139) The name is found in the Old English poem Beowulf, where the hero uses the word as an epithet for the sword Hrunting, lent to him by Hrothgar's thane Unferth for the fight with Grendel's mother.

==== Hadhafang ====
Hadhafang is the sword invented for Peter Jackson's The Lord of the Rings film trilogy, where it was wielded by Arwen, although she is never actually seen using it in combat, as the blade's design was for main use on horseback, and footage of Arwen at Helm's Deep was ultimately cut. The name is derived from Tolkien's etymological word list written in the 1930s; here Tolkien provides the word hadhathang (dissimilated: havathang, hadhafang), which he translates as "throng-cleaver", though he never used this name in his writings.

==== Herugrim ====
Herugrim (Old English: Fierce Sword) is the sword that belonged to Théoden. (Note: Tolkien 1954, p. 123)

==== Narsil / Andúril ====
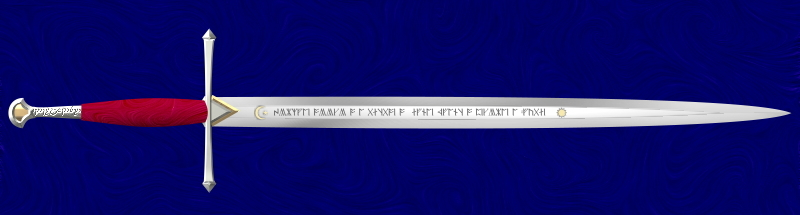
Artist's impression of the re-forged Andúril, with runic inscription, crescent Moon and rayed Sun. A single star is shown rather than Tolkien's "seven stars".

Narsil (Quenya: roughly, Red and White Flame (Note: Tolkien 1955, Appendix A "The Númenorean Kings", "Eriador, Arnor, and the Heirs of Isildur", "The North-kingdom and the Dúnedain", entry for Chieftain Aranarth; Carpenter 2023)) is a sword in The Lord of the Rings and The Silmarillion, (Note: Tolkien 1977, "Of the Rings of Power and the Third Age", Index "Narsil"; Tolkien 1980, pp. 272, 275) (Note: Tolkien 1954a, book 2, ch. 2, "The Council of Elrond") (Note: Tolkien 1954, book 3, ch. 6 "The King of the Golden Hall") influenced by the legendary Arthurian sword Excalibur and by Sigurd's sword Gram, as described in the Old Norse Völsunga saga. The sword was forged during the First Age by the Dwarf Telchar of Nogrod, a famous weaponsmith and artificer who also made the knife Angrist (which cut a Silmaril from the crown of Morgoth) and the Helm of Hador (later used by Túrin Turambar). By the end of the Second Age Narsil was borne by Elendil; during the Last Alliance of Elves and Men it was broken in two pieces in the war against Sauron. Isildur used the hilt-shard to cut the One Ring from Sauron's hand. The two shards, acquiring the additional name the Sword that was Broken, remained an heirloom of Isildur's heirs throughout the Third Age, and were thus inherited by Aragorn. Elvish smiths re-forged the sword for Aragorn before the Fellowship of the Ring began their quest; Aragorn renamed it Andúril (Quenya: Flame of the West). The reforged Andúril is described as very bright, shining red and white with the light of the sun and moon. (Note: Tolkien 1954, book 3, ch. 7, "Helm's Deep") The Silmarillion further states that the original Narsil already shone in such a manner, but its light was extinguished when it was broken. (Note: Tolkien 1977, "Of the Rings of Power and the Third Age") The reforged blade had "a device of seven stars set between the crescent Moon and the rayed Sun, and about them was written many runes".

In the movie set, Aragorn is always displayed using Andúril as a two-handed sword. Elendil the Tall, being 2.5 rangar tall (241 cm), could have wielded Narsil single-handedly and used a shield on his other hand.

==== Orcrist ====
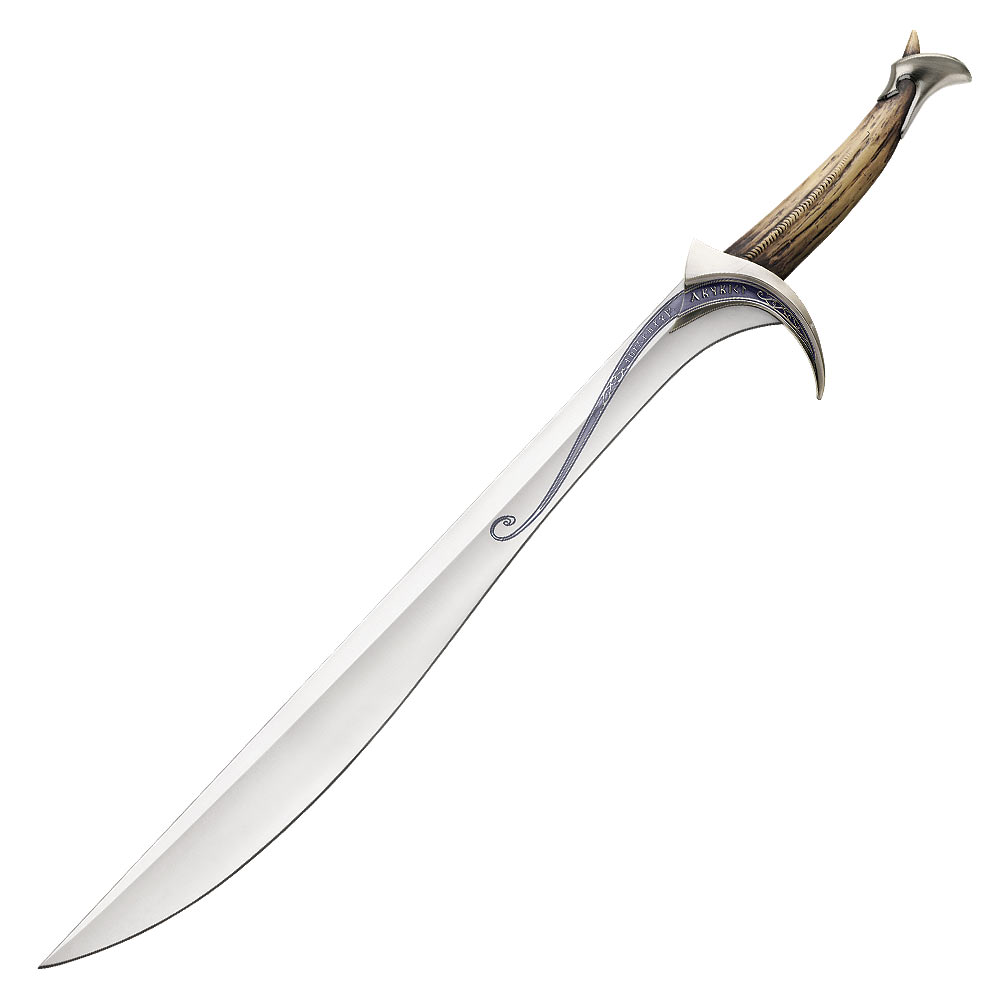
Sword "Orcrist" as seen in "The Hobbit"

Orcrist (Sindarin: Goblin-cleaver), a sword in The Hobbit, was forged in Gondolin and was nicknamed "Biter" by the goblins of the Misty Mountains. After finding it in a troll-hoard, Thorin Oakenshield carries the sword through the Misty Mountains and Mirkwood before being taken prisoner by the Elves; it was laid on his tomb after his death in the Battle of Five Armies. It is the mate of Glamdring.

==== Ringil ====
Ringil (Sindarin: Cold-Star / Cold-Spark) is a sword wielded by Fingolfin in The Silmarillion and The Lays of Beleriand. It bit with chilling cold, and glittered like ice with a pale light. This was the sword with which Fingolfin wounded Morgoth seven times, causing the first dark lord to limp forever afterward. (Note: Tolkien 1977, "Of the Ruin of Beleriand", Index "Ringil") (Note: Tolkien 1985, "The Lay of Leithian", Canto XII)

In Tolkien's early writings, Ringil was the name of one of the two pillars supporting the Two Lamps of primeval Middle-earth. (Note: Tolkien 1984 (Part I) pp. 69–70)

==== Sting ====
Elijah Wood as Frodo, holding Sting, in Peter Jackson's The Lord of the Rings film trilogy

Sting is a large Elvish dagger in The Hobbit and The Lord of the Rings. It functioned well as a sword for the hobbits Bilbo and Frodo Baggins. (Note: Tolkien 1937, ch. 2, "Roast Mutton"; Tolkien 1954a, pp. 23, 290; Tolkien 1954, p. 221, Tolkien 1955, p. 173, 204) Bilbo named the weapon after using it to fend off the giant spiders in Mirkwood forest, then later passed it on to Frodo to use in his quest to destroy the One Ring. Sting glows blue when orcs are nearby, as in Moria. In Europe, bilbo blades were exceptionally fine swords, named after the city of Bilbao which made them. It is possible that Tolkien connected Bilbo's name with his acquisition of this weapon. (Note: Rateliff comments: "I would suggest that it's far more likely Bilbo gains Sting because Tolkien became aware of the 'bilbow blade = sword' entry in the OED than that the character was given the name with the idea of his becoming a sword-wielder already in mind. However, as there was a Count Frodo and a Bishop Bilbo in the Frankish Kingdom of the middle ages as well as another noble named Fredegar it is more likely that these Hobbit names were mined from Frankish history.")

In Peter Jackson's The Lord of the Rings and The Hobbit film adaptations, Sting is depicted as leaf-shaped, with gentle curving edges. Engraved on the blade and cross-guard are letters in Sindarin that read phonetically, Maegnas aen estar nin dagnir in yngyl im. Translated into English, they read, "Maegnas is my name, I am the spider's bane." According to the Appendix of The Silmarillion, the element maeg in Sindarin means "sharp" or "piercing". (Note: Tolkien 1977, Appendix "Elements in Quenya and Sindarin Names", maeg) The film version of Sting is 23 inches (580 mm) long (24 while in scabbard) and 3 inches (76 mm) wide at the hilt. Its scabbard is made of brown leather and reinforced with metal.

=== Named bows and arrows ===
==== Belthronding ====
Belthronding (Sindarin/Ilkorin: Intractable Bow (Note: Tolkien 1987, p. 388)) is the bow wielded by Beleg Cúthalion (Strongbow) in The Silmarillion and The Lays of Beleriand. (Note: Tolkien 1977, "Of Turin Turambar", Index "Belthronding"; Tolkien 1985, p. 26, 117, 127)

==== Black arrow ====
The black arrow was used in Esgaroth by Bard the Bowman; he mentions that it has been used many times, always successfully, and always recovered. An heirloom from many generations of Bard's family, that he believed had been made in the forges of the King under the Mountain; Bard recites its history, urges it to "go now and speed well", and shoots Smaug. It was lost with the Dragon's corpse in the Long Lake.

==== Dailir ====
Dailir is the arrow favoured by Beleg, the great bowman of the First Age of Middle-earth. Beleg was always able to retrieve this arrow for reuse.

==== Red Arrow ====
The Red Arrow is a black-feathered arrow barbed with steel; its tip was painted red. (Note: Tolkien 1955, book 5, ch. 3 "The Muster of Rohan") It was a token used by Gondor to summon Rohan in time of dire need. In The Return of the King, the Red Arrow was presented to Théoden by Hirgon with the message: "...the Lord Denethor asks for all your strength and all your speed, lest Gondor should fall at last." Théoden pledged his assistance, but Hirgon was killed during the ride back to Minas Tirith, leading Denethor to believe that no help was forthcoming from Rohan. The Red Arrow has a historical antecedent in the Old English poem Elene in which Constantine the Great summoned an army of mounted Visigoths to his aid against the Huns by sending an arrow as a "token of war".

=== Other named weapons and armour ===
==== Aeglos ====
Aeglos (Sindarin: Snow Point, i.e. icicle; (Note: Tolkien 1977, Index "Aeglos") also spelt Aiglos) is the spear wielded by the Elf-King Gil-galad. It was said that "the Spear of Gil-galad and the Sword of Elendil, Aiglos and Narsil, none could withstand." (Note: Tolkien 1954a, book 2, ch. 2: "The Council of Elrond"; Tolkien 1977, "Of the Rings of Power and the Third Age"; Tolkien 1980, p. 148, 417) (Note: A Tolkienist semiannual almanac published by the Polish Silesian Science-Fiction Club, parent organisation of the Polish Tolkien Society, is named Aeglos.)

==== Dragon-helm of Dor-lómin ====
The Dragon-helm of Dor-lómin, also called the Helm of Hador, is the fabulous helmet of the lords of the House of Hador, including Húrin and Túrin. The helm was made of heavy steel, decorated with gold and runes; a gold likeness of Glaurung the Dragon was set upon its crest. It was made for the Dwarf-king Azaghâl by Telchar, the great Dwarf-craftsman of Nogrod. (Note: Tolkien 1985, part 1 "The Lay of the Children of Húrin", second version ch. 2, p. 115, line 678) Azaghâl ruled the neighbouring city of Belegost; he gave it to Maedhros, who gave it to Fingon. Fingon then gave it to Hador, along with the lordship of Dor-lómin. (Note: Tolkien 1980, part 1 ch. II p. 75)

==== Axe of Tuor ====
The Axe of Tuor, called Dramborleg (Gnomish: Thudder-Sharp) in The Book of Lost Tales, is the great axe belonging to Tuor, son of Huor in Unfinished Tales of Númenor and Middle-earth that left wounds like "both a heavy dint as of a club and cleft as a sword". It was later held by the Kings of Numenor, until lost in the downfall. (Note: Tolkien 1980, p. 172; Tolkien 1984b (vol. 2), "The Fall of Gondolin")

==== Durin's Axe ====
Durin's Axe was part of the regalia and weaponry of the Dwarf-kings of Khazad-dûm. Some years before the War of the Ring, Balin attempted to recolonize Khazad-dûm (by then called Moria), and the early records of the colony mention Durin's Axe, indicating it was sought for or even found.

==== Grond ====
Grond (Sindarin: Club) is the mace of Morgoth used against Fingolfin in The Silmarillion (Note: Tolkien 1977, "Of the Ruin of Beleriand", Index "Grond") as well as a battering ram in The Lord of the Rings, (Note: Tolkien 1955, p. 112) used to assault the Great Gate of Minas Tirith. Grond the battering ram was in-universe named after Morgoth's mace: "Grond they named it, in memory of the Hammer of the Underworld of old." (Note: Tolkien 1955, book 5, ch. 4 "The Siege of Gondor".)

== Film prop construction ==
In The Lord of the Rings film trilogy, "hero" weapons, used for "beauty" shots such as close-ups, were made from high-quality materials: sword blades from heat-treated spring steel; sword hilts from cast bronze or forged and ground steel. "Stunt" swords, used in combat scenes, were made with soft aluminium blades and urethane grips. "Extras" swords were cast entirely from urethane, in one piece. Bows were made of urethane with an inner armature of spring steel. Legolas's arrows were all-digital, so the actor simply mimed shooting each arrow.
