= Naming of weapons in Middle-earth =

Theme in Tolkien's fiction

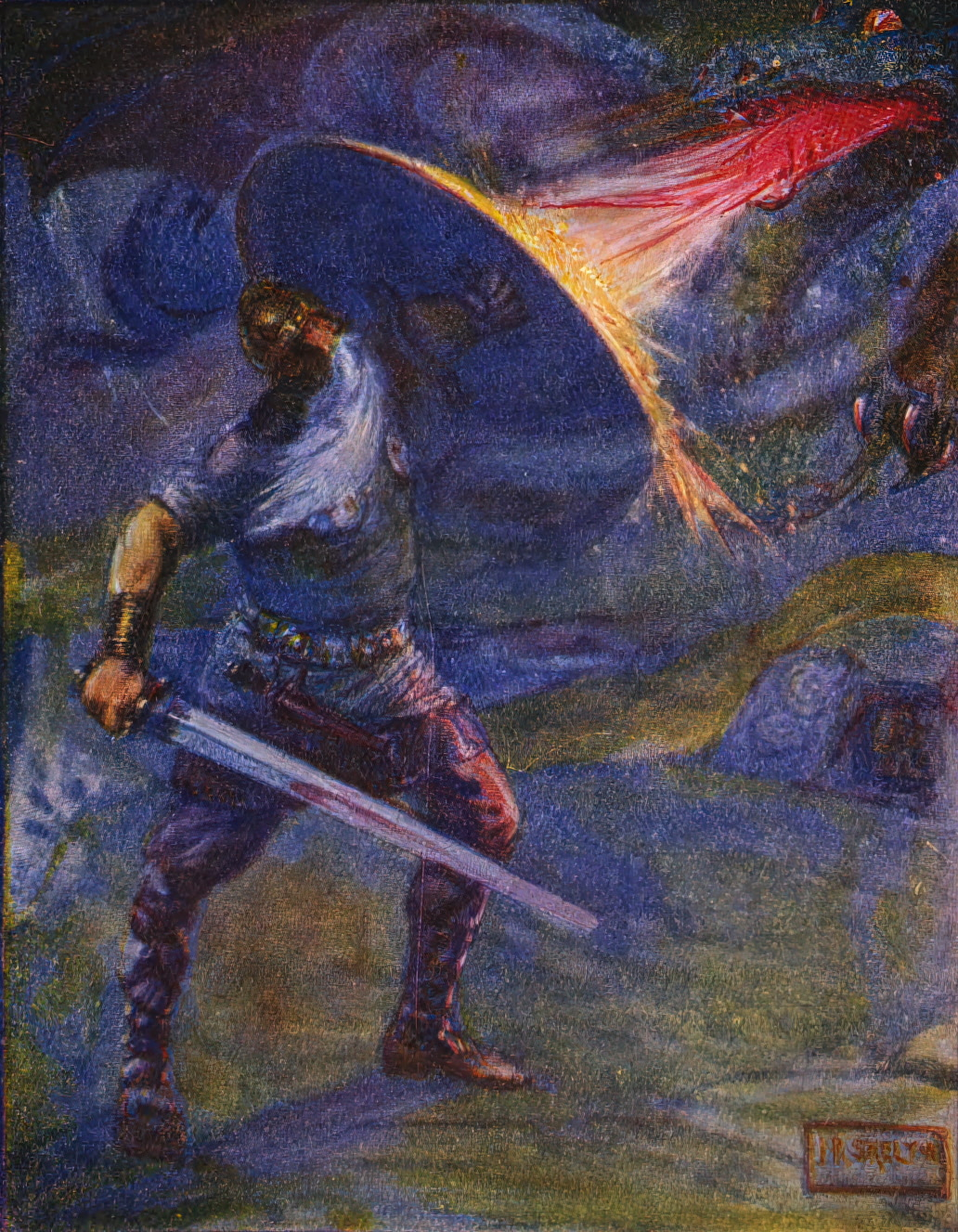
Beowulf fights the dragon with the sword Nægling. 1908 illustration by Joseph Ratcliffe Skelton

The naming of weapons in Middle-earth is the giving of names to swords and other powerful weapons in J. R. R. Tolkien's legendarium. He derived the naming of weapons from his knowledge of Medieval times; the practice is found in Norse mythology and in the Old English poem Beowulf. Among the many weapons named by Tolkien are Orcrist and Glamdring in The Hobbit, and Narsil / Andúril in The Lord of the Rings. Such weapons carry powerful symbolism, embodying the identity and ancestry of their owners.

There are multiple parallels between Tolkien's usage of named weapons in his Middle-earth writings, and the Medieval epics. These include their inheritance as heirlooms, sometimes royal; their rediscovery in ancient treasure-hoards; their being broken and reforged; their adornment with runic inscriptions; and their interlinking with the lives of their owners.

== Background ==
=== Naming of Medieval weapons ===
In Medieval epics, heroes gave names to their weapons. The name, lineage, and power of the weapon reflected on the hero. Among the major tales are those of Sigurd the Volsung and his sword Gram that he used to kill the dragon Fafnir; (Note: Gram is indeed so strong and sharp that it can cut an anvil in half.) Beowulf and the swords Hrunting and Nægling; King Arthur's Excalibur, the "Sword in the Stone"; Roland's Durendal; Waldere's Mimming; and the Elder Edda's account of the "Waking of Angantyr" (the Hervararkviða) and the sword Tyrfing.

Heroic literature did not always name its weapons; in ancient Greece, Homer describes the shield and spear of Achilles in detail but does not give them names. He does not name the crucial bow of Odysseus: the weapon that allows him to demonstrate his own identity, his own name as he returns home to Ithaca, functions anonymously in the story. The case is different in the stories and myths of medieval Northern Europe, where the name of a weapon, especially of a sword, gave it an identity, almost a personality. The name, writes the Tolkien scholar Janet Brennan Croft, "marks a weapon as an heirloom tying generations together and legitimizing the heir who holds it." Some 200 sword names are recorded in medieval writings, in line with the Norse practice of naming objects in stories, such as the Dwarf-made chain Gleipnir that unbreakably fastened Fenris the giant wolf.

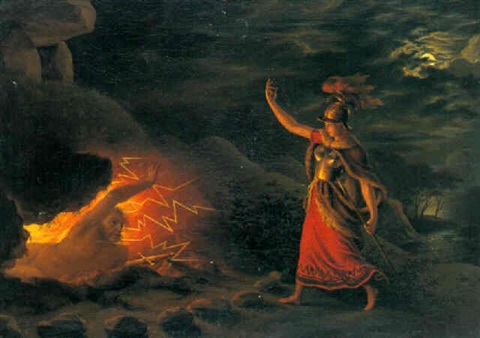
Hervör wakes her father Angantýr's ghost from his barrow to demand the cursed sword Tyrfing as an heirloom.

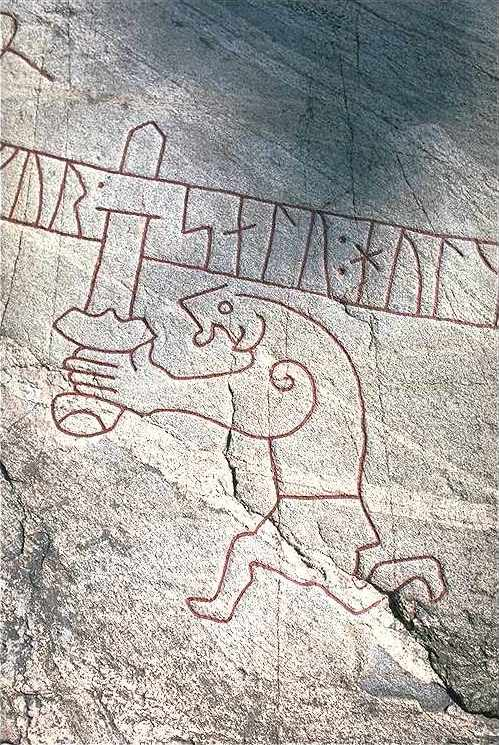
Sigurd holding the sword Gram on the Ramsund carving, c. 1030

=== Powerful swords ===
The Sæbø sword's inscription

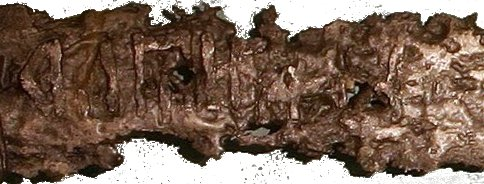
Runes in silver on the 8th-century Sæbø sword

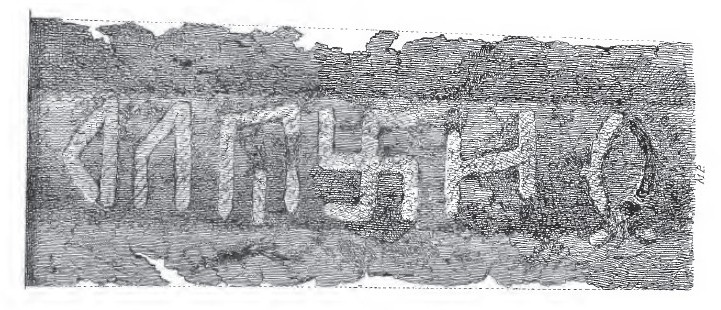
The runic inscription has been interpreted as reading right-to-left Oh Þurmuþ, "Thurmuth owns me", the swastika standing for "Thor".

Such weapons were praised both for their strength and for their history. For example, Nægling is repeatedly described with epithets such as "sharp", "gleaming", "bright", "mighty", and "strong", while its history is explicitly recalled in phrases such as "excellent ancient sword", "ancient heirloom", and "old and grey". They might have magical powers: Excalibur shines

so bryght in his enemyes eyen that it gaf light lyke thirty torchys, and therwith he put hem on bak and slew moche peple".

in Modern English:
so bright in his enemies' eyes that it gave light like thirty torches, and therewith he drove them back and killed many people.

In Norse mythology, similarly, a sword may shine like the sun, as in the Poetic Edda: "Surt from the south comes / With flickering flame; Shines from his sword / The Val-god’s sun."

Swords may be heirlooms within a royal family, or may be recovered from ancient hoards of treasure, in either case having a lineage and story of their own. A sword-blade could be adorned with runes; these might attach power, history, and magic spells to the weapon, just as Sigurd was instructed to engrave runes of wisdom and victory on his sword Gram. The historian of arms Ewart Oakeshott described the sword as having "a potent mystique which sets it above any other man-made object". Swords had two attributes which made them especially highly prized: they were costly to manufacture, and effective as weapons.

== In Middle-earth ==
=== Weapons of power ===
Tolkien named many weapons, mainly swords, but also including Aeglos, the spear of the Elf-king Gil-Galad; Belthronding, Beleg's bow; Dramborleg, Tuor's axe; and Grond, the name both of the evil battering-ram from Minas Morgul, and of the mace of the first Dark Lord, Morgoth, in his Middle-earth writings. As in medieval epics, the sword in particular symbolised the heroism and position of its owner. As the Tolkien scholar Verlyn Flieger put it, the sword "proclaims the emergence of the hero"; further, "the fates of sword and man are linked, and the destruction of one signals the end of the other".

Such themes can be seen clearly with Aragorn's sword Andúril, but they run similarly through Tolkien's accounts of many other named weapons. The swords Glamdring and Orcrist named in The Hobbit fit two strands of the Medieval pattern, as they are both ancient, having been forged in the First Age, and were retrieved from a treasure-hoard, having been held by the three Trolls in their cave. (Note: Tolkien 1937, The Hobbit, ch. 2 "Roast Mutton") Reforging and rediscovery effectively pass old power to the new weapon and its new owner, and renew that power.

Comparison of Glamdring and Orcrist with swords in Medieval legend
Attribute	The Lord of the Rings	Medieval legend
Age	Forged in the First Age for Turgon, King of Gondolin	Ancient
Source	Troll-cave	Treasure-hoard

These two swords actually each have three names (polyonymy): in the high and ancient tongue (Sindarin); a translation into the Common Speech (Westron), rendered as English; and a goblin nickname.

Polyonymy of swords in The Hobbit
Language	Gandalf's sword	Thorin's sword
Sindarin, an Elvish language	Glamdring	Orcrist
Common Speech	Foe-hammer	Goblin-cleaver
Goblin nickname	Beater	Biter

Glamdring and Orcrist, and Bilbo's knife used as a sword, which he named Sting, gleam when Orcs are nearby; the ancient swords terrify the Orcs, and are recognised by them; indeed, the Orcs have their own nicknames for the two famous swords, Biter and Beater. These weapons have numerous connections to the famous swords of Medieval mythology, including, according to the Tolkien scholars K. S. Whetter and R. Andrew McDonald, the style and content of their names, which recall the names of swords in Norse mythology such as Fotbitr and Dragvandil ("Leg-biter" and "Slicer"). Indeed, in The Hobbit, when Bilbo's party arrive at Rivendell, Elrond reads the swords' runic inscriptions and describes the heroic history and lineage of the recovered weapons: (Note: Tolkien 1937, The Hobbit, ch. 3 "A Short Rest")

They are old swords, very old swords of the High Elves of the West, my kin. They were made in Gondolin for the Goblin-wars. They must have come from a dragon's hoard or goblin plunder, for dragons and goblins destroyed that city many ages ago. This, Thorin, the runes name Orcrist, the Goblin-cleaver in the ancient tongue of Gondolin; it was a famous blade. This, Gandalf, was Glamdring, Foe-hammer that the king of Gondolin once wore. Keep them well!"

=== "Renewed shall be blade that was broken" ===
The Lord of the Rings hero Aragorn, heir of the kingdoms of Gondor and Arnor, carried the shards of the sword Narsil, broken when his ancestor Elendil died in battle with the Dark Lord Sauron. (Note: Tolkien 1977, The Silmarillion, "Of the Rings of Power and the Third Age") Its name, Narsil, contained the roots for "fire" and "white light", meaning "Sun and Moon" in Quenya. (Note: Carpenter 2023, #347 to Richard Jeffery, 17 December 1972) It had been forged in the First Age by the greatest of the Dwarf-smiths, Telchar. He worked into the enchanted sword the ability to shine "with the light of the sun and of the moon", with the result that "the sword of Elendil filled Orcs and Men with fear". After it was broken "its light was extinguished and it was not forged anew", until Aragorn brought it to Rivendell at the end of the Third Age and the quest to destroy the One Ring. It was then remade as Andúril, meaning "Flame of the West" in Quenya:

The Sword of Elendil was forged anew by Elvish smiths, and on its blade was traced a device of seven stars set between the crescent Moon and the rayed Sun, and about them was written many runes; for Aragorn son of Arathorn was going to war upon the marches of Mordor. Very bright was that sword when it was made whole again; the light of the sun shone redly in it, and the light of the moon shone cold, and its edge was hard and keen. And Aragorn gave it a new name and called it Andúril, Flame of the West. (Note: Tolkien 1954a, The Fellowship of the Ring, book 2, ch. 3 "The Ring Goes South")

The seven stars were Elendil's heraldic device, which in turn denoted the stars, one per ship, for the seven ships that carried the seven palantirs from Númenor, the island of the West, to Middle-earth. The sword thus carried the symbolism of the lineage of Elendil and the power of the kingdom of Númenor. In addition, Tolkien wrote that the sword's original name, Narsil, "symbolised the chief heavenly lights [Sun and Moon], as enemies of darkness".

The poem that Aragorn says goes with his own name, "The Riddle of Strider", calls the sword the "blade that was broken": (Note: Tolkien 1954a, The Fellowship of the Ring, book 1, ch. 10 "Strider")

Renewed shall be blade that was broken,
The crownless again shall be king.

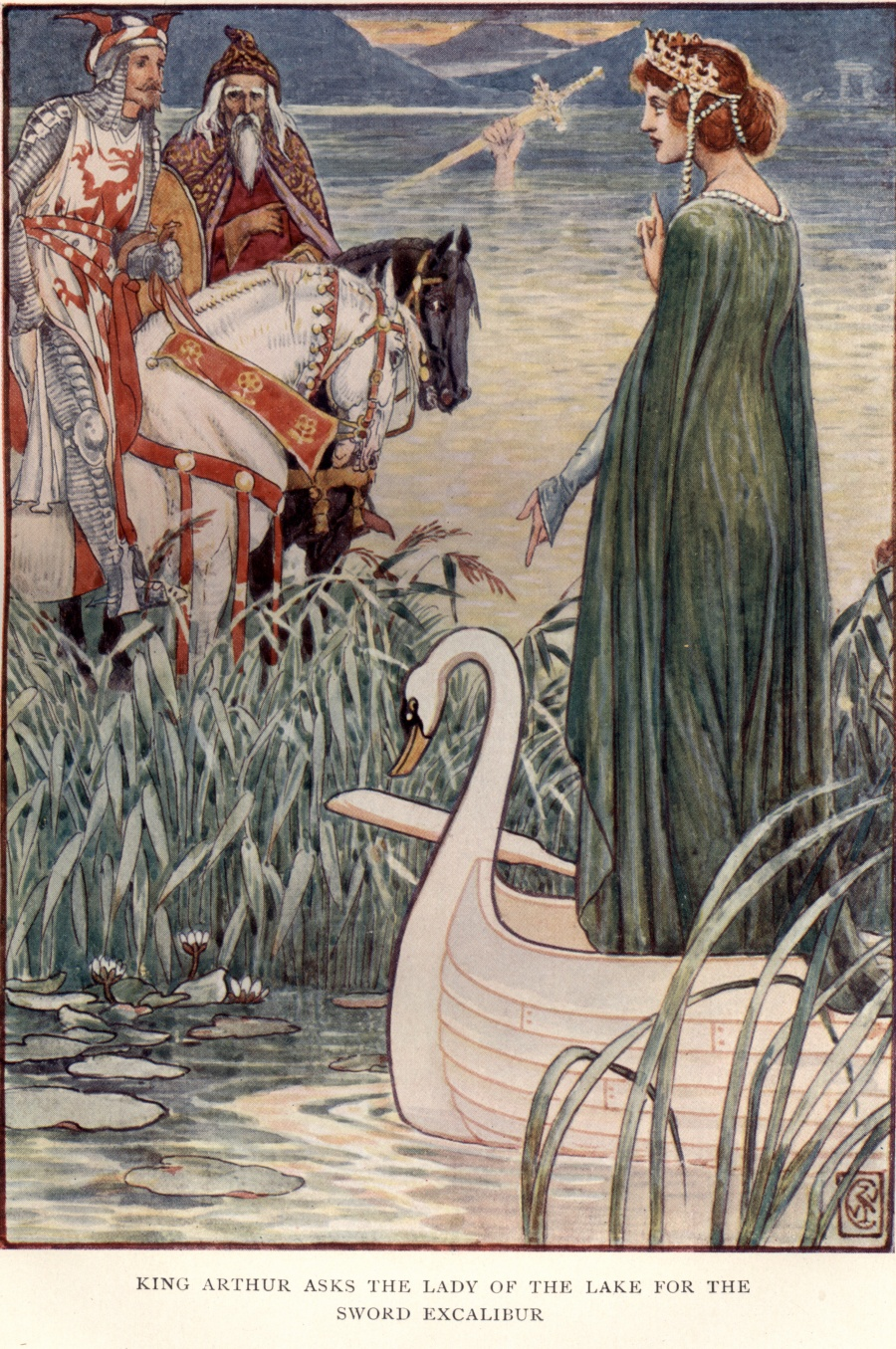
"King Arthur asks the Lady of the Lake for the sword Excalibur". 1911 illustration by Walter Crane

Comparison of Narsil / Andúril with Excalibur, the Sword in the Stone
Attribute	The Lord of the Rings	Arthurian legend
Broken	At Elendil's death	When Arthur fights King Pellinore
Delimits an era	Third Age begins as Isildur uses shards of Narsil to cut the One Ring from Sauron's hand; ends as Andúril helps to end Sauron's reign	King Arthur comes to power with Excalibur; Bedivere casts away the sword on Arthur's death
Accompanies	King leading people to victory	King leading people to victory
Magical scabbard	Blade shall not be stained or broken	Wearer shall never lose blood

There are multiple parallels here with Arthurian legend. The Sword in the Stone is broken. Just as Excalibur delimits King Arthur's reign, so Narsil delimits the Third Age, beginning when Isildur cuts the Ring from Sauron's hand, and ending when the remade Andúril helps to end Sauron's power and restore Aragorn as King. Both Kings lead their peoples to victory. The sword's magical scabbard, too, which the Elf-queen Galadriel gives to Aragorn as he leaves Lothlórien with the words "The blade that is drawn from this sheath shall not be stained or broken even in defeat", (Note: Tolkien 1954a, The Fellowship of the Ring, book 2, ch. 8 "Farewell to Lórien") parallels Excalibur's sheath, which guarantees that its wearer "shall never lose no blood, be ye never so sore wounded". The elven scabbard describes the sword it was made for:

It was overlaid with a tracery of flowers and leaves wrought of silver and gold, and on it were set in elven-runes formed of many gems the name Andúril and the lineage of the sword.

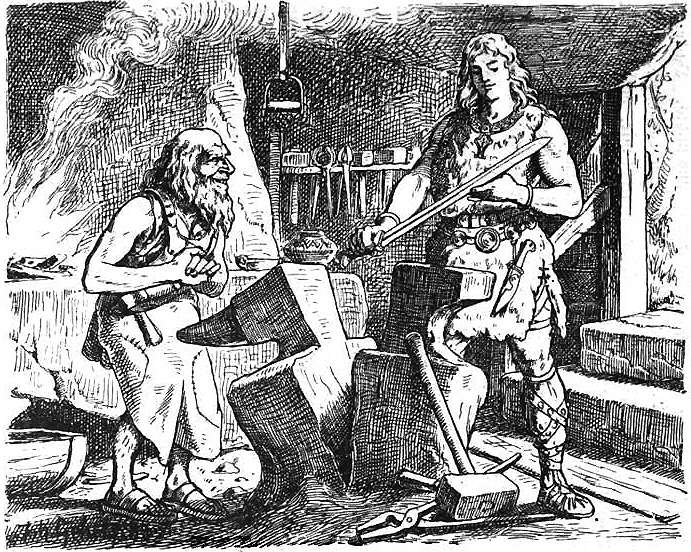
The Dwarf-smith Regin watches as Sigurd proofs the sword Gram that he has reforged for him. Illustration by Johannes Gehrts (1901)

Comparison of Narsil / Andúril with swords in Norse mythology
Attribute	The Lord of the Rings	Norse mythology
Making	Narsil was made by Dwarves	Tyrfing was made by Dwarves Dvalin and Durin
Shining	Andúril shines like Sun and Moon	Tyrfing shines like fire
Remade	Elves reforge Narsil as Andúril	The Dwarf-smith Regin remakes Gram, at Sigmund's dying wish

The theme of the sword that was broken is found in various places in Norse mythology. Burdge and Burke write that Tyrfing, like Narsil, was Dwarf-forged, in its case by Dvalin and Durin. They made Tyrfing shine like fire; Andúril shines like Sun and Moon. Sigurd's sword Gram, too, was remade, by the Dwarf-smith Regin; Sigurd's father Sigmund's dying wish was for his sword to be reforged; and flames leapt from Gram's edges. Aragorn's sword thus combines the natures of the Norse sword Gram and the Arthurian Excalibur.

The reforged and renamed Narsil / Andúril pair has a parallel, too, within Tolkien's legendarium. The hero of the First Age, Túrin's sword, is similarly renamed: Anglachel becomes Gurthang. The Tolkien scholars K. S. Whetter and Andrew McDonald call these weapons almost "living personalities"; Croft notes that at the end, Gurthang actually speaks to Túrin. However, while the reforging of Andúril symbolizes the remaking of Middle-earth and the transformation of Aragorn from Ranger to King, the mere renaming of Gurthang fails to change its "essentially malefic" nature. Like the flawed hero Túrin, who likewise takes on different names, its character cannot be changed by giving it a new name. In contrast, Aragorn's sword represents the true hero.

Comparison of Aragorn's and Túrin's swords and characters
Attribute	Aragorn	Túrin
Character	True hero	Flawed, violent warrior
Sword was	Narsil ("Red and white flame", i.e. Sun and Moon)	Anglachel, "Iron of the flaming star"
Sword belonged to	His ancestor Elendil	His friend the Elf Beleg
Sword's owner is killed	Fighting the Dark Lord Sauron, hand-to-hand	Accidentally, by Túrin
Sword is	Reforged as Andúril, "Flame of the West", symbol of hope	Renamed as Gurthang, "Iron of Death"
Owner	Was "Strider", a Ranger, becomes King; is given many names – Elessar (elfstone), Envinyatar (the renewer), Estel (hope), Thorongil (eagle of the star)	Is unable to reform himself, despite taking on many names – Neithan (the wronged), Gorthol (dread helm), Agarwaen (bloodstained), Adanedhel (elf-man), Thurin (the secret), Mormegil (black sword), Turambar (master of doom), Dagnir Glaurunga (Glaurung's bane), Naeramarth (evil-fated)
Sword kills	Only at need	Indiscriminately: Dragon Glaurung; Beleg by accident; Brandir, unjustly; finally, Túrin himself
Outcome	Renewal of his people, kingdom, and Middle-earth	Disaster to his people
