= Dwarves in Middle-earth =

Humanoid race in J. R. R. Tolkien's legendarium

Dwarves
- Middle-earth race
- Detail of Dwarves marching from a 1936 pencil and black ink drawing by J.R.R. Tolkien
- First appearance: The Hobbit
- Created by: J. R. R. Tolkien

In-universe information
- Other names: Khazad, Naugrim
- Created by: Aulë
- Home world: Middle-earth
- Language: Khuzdul, Westron
- Notable members: Thorin II Oakenshield; Balin; Gimli

In the fantasy of J. R. R. Tolkien, the Dwarves are a race inhabiting Middle-earth, the central continent of Arda in an imagined mythological past. They are based on the dwarfs of Germanic myths who were small humanoids that lived in mountains, practising mining, metallurgy, blacksmithing and jewellery. Tolkien described them as tough, warlike, and lovers of stone and craftsmanship.

The origins of Tolkien's Dwarves can be traced to Norse mythology; Tolkien also mentioned a connection with Jewish history and language. Dwarves appear in his books The Hobbit (1937), The Lord of the Rings (1954–55), and the posthumously published The Silmarillion (1977), Unfinished Tales (1980), and The History of Middle-earth series (1983–96), the last three edited by his son Christopher Tolkien.

== Characteristics ==
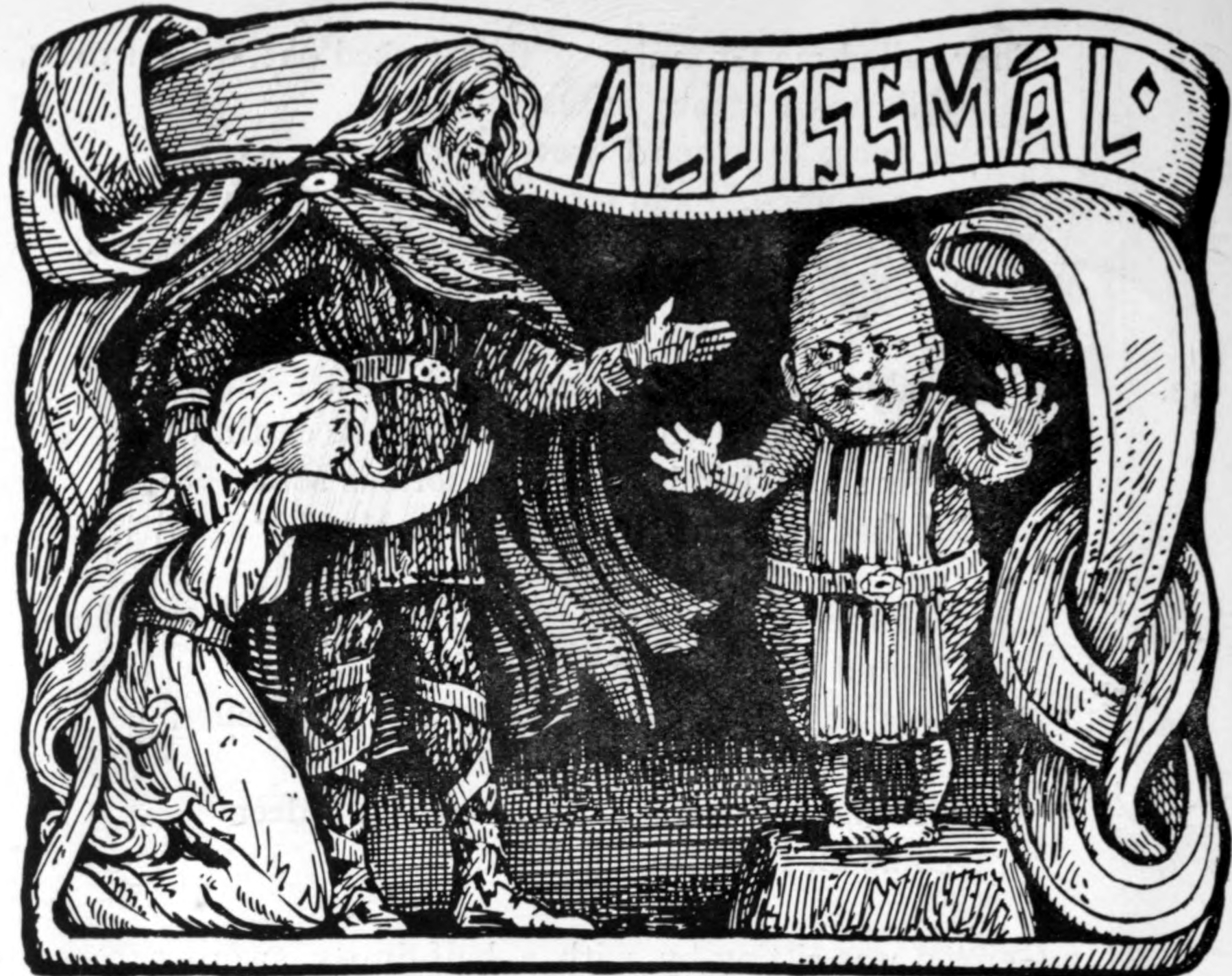
Tolkien found dwarves in Norse mythology. Here the god Thor talks to the dwarf Alviss to prevent him from marrying his daughter Þrúðr; at dawn Alviss turns to stone. Drawing by W. G. Collingwood, 1908

The medievalist Charles Moseley described the dwarves of Tolkien's legendarium as "Old Norse" in their names, their feuds, and their revenges. In the appendix on "Durin's Folk" in The Lord of the Rings, Tolkien describes dwarves as:

a tough, thrawn race for the most part, secretive, laborious, retentive of the memory of injuries (and of benefits), lovers of stone, of gems, of things that take shape under the hands of the craftsmen rather than things that live by their own life. But they are not evil by nature, and few ever served the Enemy of free will, whatever the tales of Men alleged. For Men of old lusted after their wealth and the work of their hands, and there has been enmity between the races. (Note: Tolkien 1955, Appendix A, part 3, "Durin's Folk")

The J. R. R. Tolkien Encyclopedia considers Tolkien's use of the adjective "thrawn", noting its similarity with Þráinn, a noun meaning "obstinate person", and a name found in the Norse list of Dwarf-names, the Dvergatal in the Völuspá. Tolkien took it for the name, Thráin, of two of Thorin Oakenshield's ancestors. It suggests this may have been a philological joke on Tolkien's part.

Dwarves were long-lived, with a lifespan of some 250 years. They breed slowly, for no more than a third of them are female, not all marry, and they have children only late in life. Tolkien names only one female, Dís, Thorin's sister. (Note: Tolkien 1996, "The Making of Appendix A": (iv) "Durin's Folk") They are still considered children in their 20s, as Thorin was at age 24; (Note: Tolkien 1937, ch. 1 "An Unexpected Party") and as "striplings" in their 30s. Despite his young age, Dáin Ironfoot was 32 when he killed Azog, the orc chieftain of Moria. They had children starting in their 90s.

Durin's Folk, showing the Dwarvish tendency to have few children (and fewer daughters) (Note: Names in italics in the family tree are Thorin and his company from The Hobbit.)

Durin I	Dwarves of Moria
Durin VI
Náin I
Thráin I
Thorin I
Glóin
Óin
Náin II
Dáin I	Borin
Frór	Thrór	Grór	Farin
Thráin II	Náin	Fundin	Gróin
Dís (♀)	Thorin II; Oakenshield	Dáin II; Ironfoot	Dwalin, Balin	Glóin	Óin	Ori, Dori, Nori	Bifur, Bofur, Bombur
Fili, Kili	Thorin III; Stonehelm	Gimli
Durin VII

The Dwarves are described as "the most redoubtable warriors of all the Speaking Peoples" (Note: Tolkien 1996, part 2, ch. 10 "Of Dwarves and Men") – a warlike race who fought fiercely against their enemies, including other Dwarves. (Note: Tolkien 1977, ch. 10 "Of the Sindar") Highly skilled in the making of weapons and armour, their main weapon was the battle axe, but they also used bows, swords, shields and mattocks, and wore armour. (Note: Tolkien 1937, ch. 15 "The Gathering of the Clouds")

Sauron gave seven Rings of Power to Dwarf lords. The Rings caused them to be wrathful and greedy for gold, but they were not brought under Sauron's domination, (Note: Tolkien 1977, Of the Rings of Power and the Third Age) nor did they gain longer life. Eventually all seven Rings were destroyed or reclaimed by Sauron. One of the rings was given to Durin III, and passed down to Thrór, who gave it to his son Thráin II, father of Thorin Oakenshield. Sauron captured Thráin and took the ring from him in the dungeons of Dol Guldur.

== In-fiction origins ==
The Dwarves are portrayed in The Silmarillion as an ancient people who awake during the Years of the Trees, after the Elves at the start of the First Age, but before Men when the Sun and Moon are created. The Vala Aulë, impatient for the arising of the Children of Ilúvatar, creates the seven Fathers of the Dwarves in secret, intending them to be his children to whom he could teach his crafts. He teaches them Khuzdul, a language he had devised for them. Ilúvatar, creator of Arda, is aware of the Dwarves' creation and sanctifies them. Because they had been made by a Vala, Dwarves lacked souls until granted them by Ilúvatar. Aulë sealed the seven Fathers of the Dwarves in stone chambers in far-flung regions of Middle-earth to await their awakening. (Note: Tolkien 1977, ch. 2 "Of Aulë and Yavanna")

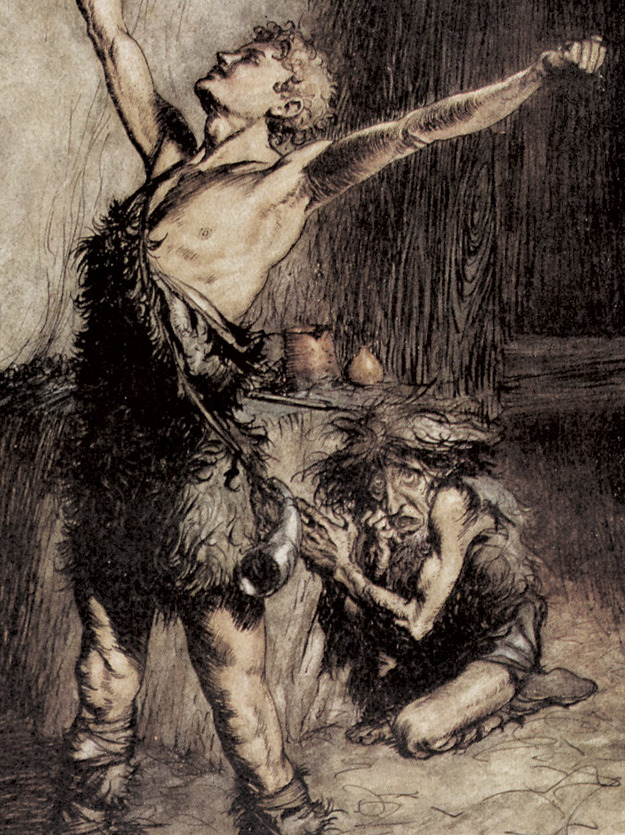
The petty-dwarf Mîm may derive from the shrunken figure of Mime, here shown cowering behind the celebrating Siegfried in Wagner's opera Der Ring des Nibelungen. Illustration by Arthur Rackham, 1911

Each of the Seven Fathers founds one of the seven Dwarf clans. Durin I is the eldest, and the first of his kind to awake in Middle-earth. He awakens in Mount Gundabad, in the northern Misty Mountains, and founds the clan of Longbeards (Durin's Folk); they found the city of Khazad-dûm below the Misty Mountains, and later realms in the Grey Mountains and Erebor (the Lonely Mountain). Two others lie in sleep in the north of the Ered Luin (Blue Mountains), and they found the lines of the Broadbeams and the Firebeards. The remaining four clans, the Ironfists, Stiffbeards, Blacklocks, and Stonefoots come from the East. After the end of the First Age, the Dwarves spoken of are almost exclusively of Durin's line. (Note: Tolkien 1954a, book 1, ch. 2 "The Shadow of the Past")

A further division, the even shorter Petty-dwarves, appears in The Silmarillion (Note: Tolkien 1977, ch. 21 "Of Túrin Turambar") and The Children of Húrin. (Note: Tolkien 2007, ch. 8 "The Land of Bow and helm") Moseley likens Mîm, the last known Petty-dwarf, to the similarly named Mime from the Nibelungenlied.

== Artefacts ==
=== Mining, masonry, and metalwork ===
As creations of Aulë, they are attracted to the substances of Arda. They mine and work precious metals throughout the mountains of Middle-earth. They are unrivalled in smithing, crafting, metalworking, and masonry, even among the Elves. The Dwarf-smith Telchar is the greatest in renown. (Note: Tolkien 1977, ch. 2 "Of Aulë and Yavanna") They build immense halls under mountains for their cities. They build many famed halls including the Menegroth, Khazad-dûm, and Erebor. Among the many treasures they forge are the named weapons Narsil, the sword of Elendil, the Dragon-helm of Dor-lómin and the necklace Nauglamír, the most prized treasure in Nargothrond and the most famed Dwarven work of the Elder Days. (Note: Tolkien 1977, ch. 22 "Of the Ruin of Doriath") In The Hobbit, Thorin gives Bilbo a Mithril coat of linked rings of mail. (Note: Tolkien 1937, ch. 13, "Not at Home")

== Language and names ==
Tolkien invented parts of Middle-earth to resolve the linguistic puzzle he had accidentally created by using different European languages for those of peoples in his legendarium. (Note: Carpenter 2023, #144, to Naomi Mitchison, 25 April 1954)

In Sindarin (Grey-elvish) the Dwarves are called Naugrim ("Stunted People"), Gonnhirrim ("Stone-lords"), and Dornhoth ("Thrawn Folk"), and Hadhodrim. In Quenya they are the Casári (deriving from the Dwarves name for themselves, Khazâd, in their own language). (Note: Tolkien 1955, Appendix F, "On Translation") Khuzdul is created for them by Aulë, rather than being descended from an Elvish language, as most of the languages of Men are. They write it using Cirth runes, a writing system originally created by Elves in Beleriand to write Sindarin, and later more fully developed by Daeron, an Elf of Doriath. The Cirth runes are adapted by Dwarves for writing Khuzdul. The Dwarves keep their language secret and do not normally teach it to others, so they learn both Quenya and Sindarin to communicate with the Elves, especially the Noldor and Sindar. By the Third Age the Dwarves are estranged from the Elves and no longer routinely learn their language. Instead, they mostly use Westron (Common Speech), a Mannish tongue, in communicating with other races. (Note: Tolkien 1955, Appendix F, "Of Other Races")

Each Dwarf has two personal names, a secret, "inner" name in Khuzdul, which is used only among other Dwarves and is never revealed to outsiders, and a public, "outer" name for use with other races, taken from the language of the people amongst whom the Dwarf lives. For example, the Dwarves of Moria and the Lonely Mountain use outer names taken from the language of the Men of the north where they lived.

In reality, Tolkien took the names of 12 of the 13 dwarves – excluding Balin – that he used in The Hobbit from the Old Norse Völuspá, long before the idea of Khuzdul arose. When he came to write The Lord of the Rings, in order to explain why the Dwarves had Norse names, he created an elaborate fiction that many of the languages used in the book were "translated" into real-life languages for the benefit of the reader, roughly retaining the relationships of the languages among themselves. Thus, Westron was translated into English, the related but more archaic language of the Rohirrim was translated into Anglo-Saxon (Old English), and the even more distantly related language of Dale was translated into Norse. It is possible that the problem of explaining the Dwarves' Norse names was the origin of the entire structure of the Mannish languages in Middle-earth along with the fiction of "translation".

=== Calendar ===
Tolkien's only mention of the Dwarves' calendar is in The Hobbit, regarding the "dwarves' New Year" (Durin's Day), which occurs on the day of the last new moon of autumn. (Note: Tolkien 1937, ch. 3 "A Short Rest") However, in his first drafts of the book, Durin's Day was the first new moon of autumn. After he had finished writing the book, Tolkien went back and changed all occurrences of the date to the last new moon, more in keeping with the real-world Celtic calendar, but overlooked one mention in Chapter IV, which still named the date as the first new moon. (Note: Tolkien 1937, ch. 4 "Over Hill and Under Hill": "They had thought of coming to the secret door in the Lonely Mountain, perhaps that very next first moon of Autumn 'and perhaps it will be Durin's Day' they had said.") Tolkien never noticed this inconsistency, and it was not corrected until the 1995 edition of the book. The astronomer Bradley E. Schaefer has analysed the astronomical determinants of Durin's Day. He concluded that – as with many real-world lunar calendars – the date of Durin's Day is observational, dependent on the first visible crescent moon.

== Analysis ==
=== Norse myth ===
In Tolkien's The Book of Lost Tales, the very few Dwarves who appear are portrayed as evil beings, employers of Orc mercenaries and in conflict with the Elves—who are the imagined "authors" of the myths, and are therefore biased against Dwarves. (Note: Tolkien 1984, "Gilfanon's Tale") (Note: Tolkien 1984, "The Nauglafring") Tolkien was inspired by the dwarves of Norse myths and of later Germanic folklore (such as that of the Brothers Grimm), from whom his Dwarves take their characteristic affinity with mining, metalworking, and crafting.

=== Jewish history ===
In The Hobbit, Dwarves are portrayed as occasionally comedic and bumbling, but largely as honourable, serious-minded, and proud. Tolkien was influenced by his own selective reading of medieval texts regarding Jewish people and their history. The dwarves' characteristics of being dispossessed of their homeland in Erebor, and living among other groups but retaining their own culture, are derived from the medieval image of Jews, while, according to the Tolkien scholar John D. Rateliff, their warlike nature stems from accounts in the Hebrew Bible. Medieval views of Jews also saw them as having a propensity for making well-crafted and beautiful things, a trait shared with Norse dwarves. The Dwarf calendar invented for The Hobbit reflects the Jewish calendar's Rosh Hashanah in beginning in late autumn.

Tolkien's use of Jewish history for his Dwarves
Aspect	Historical element	Application to Dwarves
Dispossession of homeland	Jewish diaspora	Living in exile from Moria and Erebor, retaining own culture
Warlike nature	Medieval image of Jews	Warlike Dwarves
Skill	Medieval image of Jews	Propensity for making well-crafted, beautiful things (like Norse Dwarves, too)
Jewish calendar	Rosh Hashanah, the Jewish New Year (September/October)	Dwarves' new year is in late autumn
Private language	Medieval Jews spoke Hebrew-derived language alongside local languages	Dwarves spoke "Semitic" Khuzdul amongst themselves, shared language (Westron) to others (Note: Carpenter 2023, #176 to Naomi Mitchison, 8 December 1955)

=== Semitic-style language ===
In The Lord of the Rings, Tolkien continued the themes of The Hobbit. When giving Dwarves their own language, Khuzdul, Tolkien decided to create an analogue of a Semitic language influenced by Hebrew phonology. Like medieval Jewish groups, the Dwarves used their own language only among themselves, and adopted the languages of those they live amongst for the most part, for example taking public names from the cultures they lived within, whilst keeping their "true-names" and true language a secret. Tolkien further underlined the diaspora of the Dwarves with the lost stronghold of the Mines of Moria. Tolkien elaborated on Jewish influence on his Dwarves in a letter: "I do think of the 'Dwarves' like Jews: at once native and alien in their habitations, speaking the languages of the country, but with an accent due to their own private tongue..." In the last interview before his death, Tolkien said "The dwarves of course are quite obviously, wouldn't you say, that in many ways they remind you of the Jews? Their words are Semitic, obviously, constructed to be Semitic." This raises the question, examined by Rebecca Brackmann in Mythlore, of whether there was an element of antisemitism, however deeply buried, in Tolkien's account of the Dwarves, inherited from English attitudes of his time. Brackman notes that Tolkien himself attempted to work through the issue in his Middle-earth writings. It has been suggested that the formation of the deep friendship between the dwarf Gimli and elf Legolas in the Lord of the Rings, overcoming longtime mutual suspicion, can be seen as Tolkien's reply toward "Gentile anti-Semitism and Jewish exclusiveness".

The philologist Helge Fauskanger analyses Khuzdul, finding in it features of Semitic languages.

Helge Fauskanger's analysis of Semitic features of the Dwarves' language, Khuzdul
Element	Description	Example
Word stems	Not pronounceable words, only consonants	R-Kh-S "Orc-"
Parts of speech	Nouns, verbs etc formed by inserting vowels into word stems; sometimes with doubling of a consonant	Rukhs "Orc"; Rakhâs "Orcs"
Construct state	Word before noun taken as genitival, i.e. X Y = "The X of Y", "Y's X"	Baruk Khazâd! "Axes of the Dwarves!"
Nominal sentence	Verb "to be" can be implicit	Khazâd ai-mênu! "The Dwarves [are] upon you!"

=== Spelling ===
The original editor of The Hobbit "corrected" Tolkien's plural "dwarves" to "dwarfs", as did the editor of the Puffin paperback edition. (Note: Carpenter 2023, #138 to Christopher Tolkien, 4 August 1953) According to Tolkien, the "real 'historical' plural" of "dwarf" is "dwarrows" or "dwerrows". He described the word "dwarves" as "a piece of private bad grammar". (Note: Carpenter 2023, #17 to Stanley Unwin, 15 October 1937) In Appendix F of The Lord of the Rings, Tolkien explained that if people still spoke of "dwarves" regularly, English might have retained a special plural for the word "dwarf", as with the irregular plural of "goose", "geese". Despite his fondness for it, the form "dwarrow" only appears in his writing as "Dwarrowdelf" ("Dwarf-digging"), a name for Moria. He used "Dwarves", instead, corresponding to his "Elves" as a plural for "Elf". Tolkien used "dwarvish" (Note: Tolkien 1937, Preface) and "dwarf(-)" (e.g. "Dwarf-lords", "Old Dwarf Road") as adjectives for the people he created.

== Adaptations ==
=== Films ===
Gimli in Ralph Bakshi's The Lord of the Rings (1978) voiced by David Buck

In Rankin-Bass' 1977 animated film adaptation of The Hobbit, Thorin was voiced by Hans Conried, with Don Messick voicing Balin, John Stephenson voicing Dori, Jack DeLeon voicing Dwalin, Fíli, Kíli, Óin, Glóin, Ori, Nori, Bifur, and Bofur, and Paul Frees voicing Bombur.

In Ralph Bakshi's 1978 animated film The Lord of the Rings, the part of the Dwarf Gimli was voiced by David Buck.

In Peter Jackson's live action adaptation of The Lord of the Rings film trilogy, Gimli's character is from time to time used as comic relief, whether with jokes about his height or his rivalry with the elf Legolas. Gimli is played by John Rhys-Davies, who gave the character a "Welsh-derived" accent.

In Jackson's three-film adaptation of The Hobbit, Thorin is portrayed by Richard Armitage, with Ken Stott as Balin, Graham McTavish as Dwalin, Aidan Turner as Kíli, Dean O'Gorman as Fíli, Mark Hadlow as Dori, Jed Brophy as Nori, Adam Brown as Ori, John Callen as Óin, Peter Hambleton as Glóin, William Kircher as Bifur, James Nesbitt as Bofur, and Stephen Hunter as Bombur. Jackson's films introduce a story arc not found in the original novel, in which Kili and the Elf Tauriel (a character also invented for the films) fall in love.

=== Role-playing games ===
Dwarves at the Council of Elrond in Peter Jackson's The Fellowship of the Ring

In Iron Crown Enterprises' Middle-earth Role Playing (1986), Dwarf player-characters receive statistical bonuses to Strength and Constitution, and subtractions from Presence, Agility and Intelligence. Seven "Dwarven Kindreds", named after each of the founding fathers—Durin, Bávor, Dwálin, Thrár, Druin, Thelór and Bárin—are given in The Lords of Middle-earth—Volume III (1989).

In Decipher Inc.'s The Lord of the Rings Roleplaying Game (2001), based on the Jackson films, Dwarf player-characters get bonuses to Vitality and Strength attributes and must be given craft skills.

In the real-time strategy game The Lord of the Rings: The Battle for Middle-earth II, and its expansion, both based on the Jackson films, Dwarves are heavily influenced by classical military practice, and use throwing axes, war hammers, spears, and circular shields. One dwarf unit is the "Phalanx", similar to its Greek counterpart.

== Sources ==
- Carpenter, Humphrey, ed. (2023) [1981]. The Letters of J. R. R. Tolkien: Revised and Expanded Edition. New York: HarperCollins. ISBN 978-0-35-865298-4.
- Fauskanger, Helge K. (2018). "Khuzdul - the secret tongue of the Dwarves". Ardalambion. University of Bergen. Archived from the original on 22 March 2023.
- Hammond, Wayne G.; Scull, Christina (1995). J.R.R. Tolkien: Artist and Illustrator. London: HarperCollins. ISBN 978-0-261-10322-1.
- Rateliff, John D. (2007). The History of the Hobbit. London: HarperCollins. ISBN 978-0-00-723555-1.
- Tolkien, J. R. R. (1937). The Hobbit. United Kingdom: George Allen & Unwin.
- Tolkien, J. R. R. (1954a). The Fellowship of the Ring. The Lord of the Rings. Boston: Houghton Mifflin. OCLC 9552942.
- Tolkien, J. R. R. (1955). The Return of the King. The Lord of the Rings. Boston: Houghton Mifflin. OCLC 519647821.
- Tolkien, J. R. R. (1977). Christopher Tolkien (ed.). The Silmarillion. Boston: Houghton Mifflin. ISBN 978-0-395-25730-2.
- Tolkien, J. R. R. (1996). Christopher Tolkien (ed.). The Peoples of Middle-earth. Boston: Houghton Mifflin. ISBN 978-0-395-82760-4.
- Tolkien, J. R. R. (1984). Christopher Tolkien (ed.). The Book of Lost Tales. Vol. 1. Boston: Houghton Mifflin. ISBN 0-395-35439-0.
- Tolkien, J. R. R. (2007). Christopher Tolkien (ed.). The Children of Húrin. London: HarperCollins. ISBN 0-007-24622-6.
