= Weapons and armour in Anglo-Saxon England =

Many different weapons were created and used in Anglo-Saxon England between the fifth and eleventh centuries. Spears, used for piercing and throwing, were the most common weapon. Other commonplace weapons included the sword, axe, and knife—however, bows and arrows, as well as slings, were not frequently used by the Anglo-Saxons. For defensive purposes, the shield was the most common item used by warriors, although sometimes mail and helmets were used.

Weapons also had symbolic value for the Anglo-Saxons, apparently having strong connections to gender and social status. Weapons were commonly included as grave goods in the early Anglo-Saxon burials. The vast majority of these weapons were buried in graves of men, but they also were buried in the graves of women. In a non-funerary context, weapons were occasionally deposited in the ground or near rivers. However, the establishment of a literate Christian clergy in Anglo-Saxon England resulted in the production of several textual sources that describe weapons and their use in battle. Some of these literary sources include the poems Beowulf and The Battle of Maldon.

== Evidence ==
Evidence for arms and armour in Anglo-Saxon England derives from three types of sources — archaeological, textual, and illustrative — all of which raise different interpretation issues and are not evenly distributed in a chronological manner. Due to the frequent inclusion of weapons as grave goods in the early Anglo-Saxon period, a great deal of archaeological evidence exists for Anglo-Saxon weaponry. According to historian Guy Halsall, the "deposition of grave-goods was a ritual act, wherein weaponry could symbolise age, ethnicity or rank; at various times and places a token weapon might be used to illustrate such concepts." In addition, some late Anglo-Saxon weapons have been found at riversides. The popular historian Stephen Pollington proposed that this was either a return to the prehistoric practice of "deposition in sacred waters" or a reflection of the fact that battles were being increasingly fought at fords, which is confirmed by contemporary sources such as the Anglo-Saxon Chronicle.

Archaeological evidence for Anglo-Saxon weaponry allows the documentation of the chronological development of weapon styles over time and the identification of regional variations. However, questions have been raised as to how representative these items, specifically deposited with a purpose, are of the wider array of weapons used in Anglo-Saxon life.

Scholarly knowledge of warfare itself relies mostly on literary evidence, which was produced in the Christian context of the late Anglo-Saxon period, from the eighth to the eleventh century. These literary sources are almost entirely authored by Christian clergy, and thus they do not specifically describe weapons or their use in warfare. Bede's Ecclesiastical History of the English People mentions various battles that had taken place, but gives few details. Therefore, scholars often draw from literary sources produced by neighbouring societies, such as the continental Franks and Goths, or later Vikings. Some poems, including Beowulf, Battle of Brunanburh, and The Battle of Maldon, also refer to the use of weapons in combat; however, these sources are difficult to accurately date and it is unclear to what extent such descriptions are the creation of their authors' imaginations. The law codes and wills authored in the tenth and eleventh centuries also provide some insight into the military equipment used by the Anglo-Saxon nobility in this period.

Artistic depictions of soldiers bearing weapons can also be found in some Anglo-Saxon sculpture. Such depictions also appear in manuscript illustrations and in the embroidered Bayeux Tapestry. However, the artists may have been following artistic conventions concerning the depiction of warriors and weapons rather than accurately portraying the use of such items in their society.

In Old English, the primary language of Anglo-Saxon England, multiple words were often used to denote the same type of weapon. The Beowulf poem uses at least six different words for a spear, suggesting that these terms actually had slightly varying meanings. In Old English and other Germanic languages, which were spoken across much of Northwestern Europe, tribal groups often had names that appear to be based upon the names of weapons; for instance, the Angles may have taken their name from the Old English term angul (meaning "barbed" or "hook"), the Franks from the word franca ("spear," or possibly "axe"), and the Saxons from seax ("knife").

Literary evidence from later Anglo-Saxon England indicates that only free men were permitted to bear arms. The law codes of Ine (King of Wessex from 688 to 726 CE) stipulate the imposition of fines for anyone who assists the escape of another's servant by lending them a weapon. The amount of the fine depended upon the weapon—the fine was greater for a spear than for a sword. Pollington asserted that the "Germanic peoples [which includes the Anglo-Saxons] took great pride in their weapons and lavished much attention on them, in their appearance and in their effectiveness."

== Weapon types ==
=== Spears and javelins ===
An "æsc wiga," which stands for 'ash-spear warrior' (from the Beowulf)

Spears were the most common weapons in Anglo-Saxon England. They have been found in about 85% of weapon-containing early Anglo-Saxon graves. Overall, approximately 40% of adult male graves from this period contained spears. In many Northern European societies (likely including Anglo-Saxon England), spears could only be carried by a freeman, with law codes prescribing strict punishments for any slaves discovered to possess one. In Old English, they were most commonly termed gār and spere, although some texts contain more poetic names, such as æsc ('[item made of] ash wood'), ord ('point'), and þrecwudu ('[thing of] wood for harming'). When used as a throwing-spear or javelin, it was typically called a daroþ ('dart').

The spear itself consisted of an iron spearhead mounted on a wooden shaft, often made of ash wood, although shafts of hazel, apple, oak, and maple wood have been found. There is little evidence as to the ordinary length of these spears, although estimates based on grave goods indicate that their length ranged from 1.6 to 2.8 metres (5 ft 3 in–9 ft 3 in). The end of the spear was sometimes protected with an iron ferrule, forming a hollow (or, less commonly, solid) cone which fit over the shaft. However, there was much diversity in the sizes and shapes of spearheads. Spearheads were sometimes decorated, with bronze and silver inlay placed on the blade and socket; in such instances, a simple ring-and-dot motif was most common. Occasionally, the ferrule was decorated to match the spearhead. It is possible that the shafts were also decorated, perhaps by being painted. Evidence for decorated shafts has been found in Danish contexts.

In battles, spears were used as missiles and as thrusting weapons during hand-to-hand combat. In most cases, it is not possible to identify for which of these two purposes a spear was specifically designed for. An exception is angons, or barbed spears, which were used as missiles. Once the spearhead had penetrated an enemy's body, the barb caused much difficulty in removing the weapon, thus increasing the likelihood that the pierced individual would die as a result of the wound. If the spearhead penetrated an enemy's shield, it would have been difficult to remove, thus rendering that shield heavy and difficult to use. It is possible that these angons developed from the Roman army's pilum javelins.

Old English original: "Forðon sceall gar wesan
monig morgenceald mindum bewunden
hæfan on handa."

Modern English translation: "Henceforth spear shall be, on many cold morning,
grasped in fist, lifted in hand."

— Beowulf, line 3021

Underwood suggested an effective range of 12–15 metres (40–50 feet) for spears thrown as javelins, depending on the skill of the individual throwing it and the javelin's length and weight. The Battle of Maldon poem describes the use of javelin spears in a fight between Earl Byrhtnoth's forces and a group of Vikings. In this account, one of the Vikings threw a javelin at Byrhtnoth; the Earl partially deflected it with his shield, but he was nevertheless wounded. Byrhtnoth then retaliated by throwing two javelins at the Vikings—one pierced a Viking's neck and another penetrated his chest. The Vikings threw a javelin again, wounding Byrnhoth once more, but one of the Earl's warriors pulled the javelin from the wound and threw it back, killing another Viking. Following this exchange, the two sides drew their swords and engaged in hand-to-hand combat.

When used in hand-to-hand combat, a spear could be held either under-arm or over-arm—the former method is depicted on the eighth-century Franks Casket, while the latter method is depicted on the eleventh-century Bayeux Tapestry. In some instances, spears may have been held with both hands. An eighth-century relief carving from Aberlemno in Scotland depicts a Pictish warrior holding a spear in this manner, and the Icelandic Grettis saga also describes a spear being used in this way. However, doing so would have required the warrior to relinquish the protection offered by a shield. To be more effective, ranks of spearmen would stand together to form a shield wall, mutually protecting one another with their shields while pointing their spears at the enemy. Such formations were also known as scyldburh ('shield-fortress'), bordweal ("board-wall"), and wihagan ("war-hedge").

Spears may have also had symbolic associations. In an account by Bede, the Christian priest Coifi cast a spear into his former pagan temple so as to defile it. In Anglo-Saxon England, the male side of one's family was known as "the spear side".

=== Swords ===
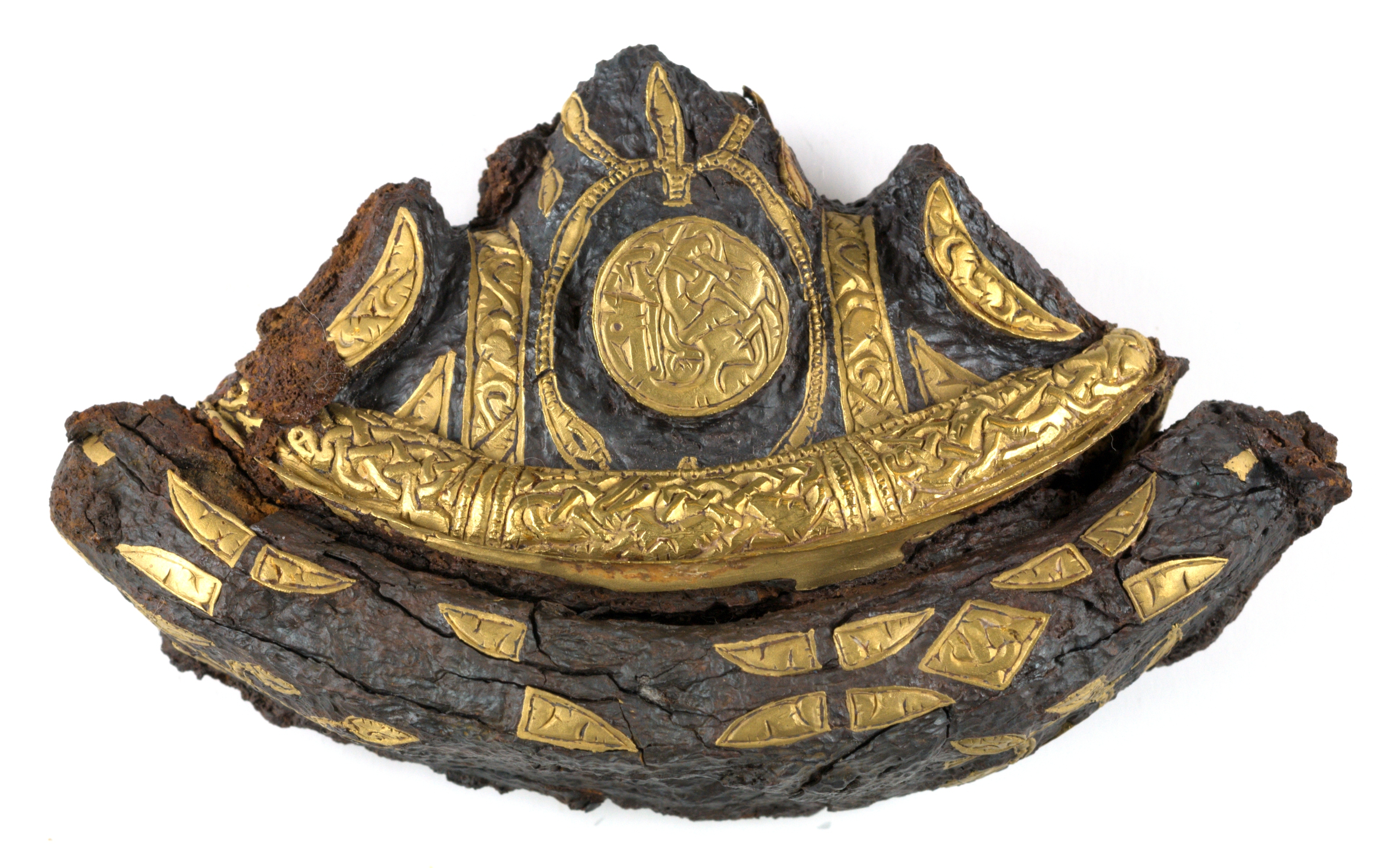
Sword pommel from the Bedale Hoard

Pollington describes the sword as "the most symbolically important weapon" of the Anglo-Saxon period, and historian Guy Halsall referred to it as "the most treasured item of early medieval military equipment." In Old English, swords were termed sweord, although other terms used for such weapons included heoru or heru, bill or bile, and mēce or mǣce. Anglo-Saxon swords comprised two-edged straight, flat blades. The tang of the blade was covered by a hilt, which consisted of an upper and lower guard, a pommel, and a grip by which the sword was held. Pommels could be elaborately decorated with a variety of styles. Examples include the Abingdon Sword or the pommel found in the Bedale Hoard, which was decorated with inlaid gold. These Anglo-Saxon blades, the tang included, typically measured 86–94 cm (34–37 in) in length, and 4.5–5.5 cm (1.8–2.2 in) in width. Larger examples have been found, with some reaching up to 100 cm (39 in) in length and 6.5 cm (2.6 in) in width.

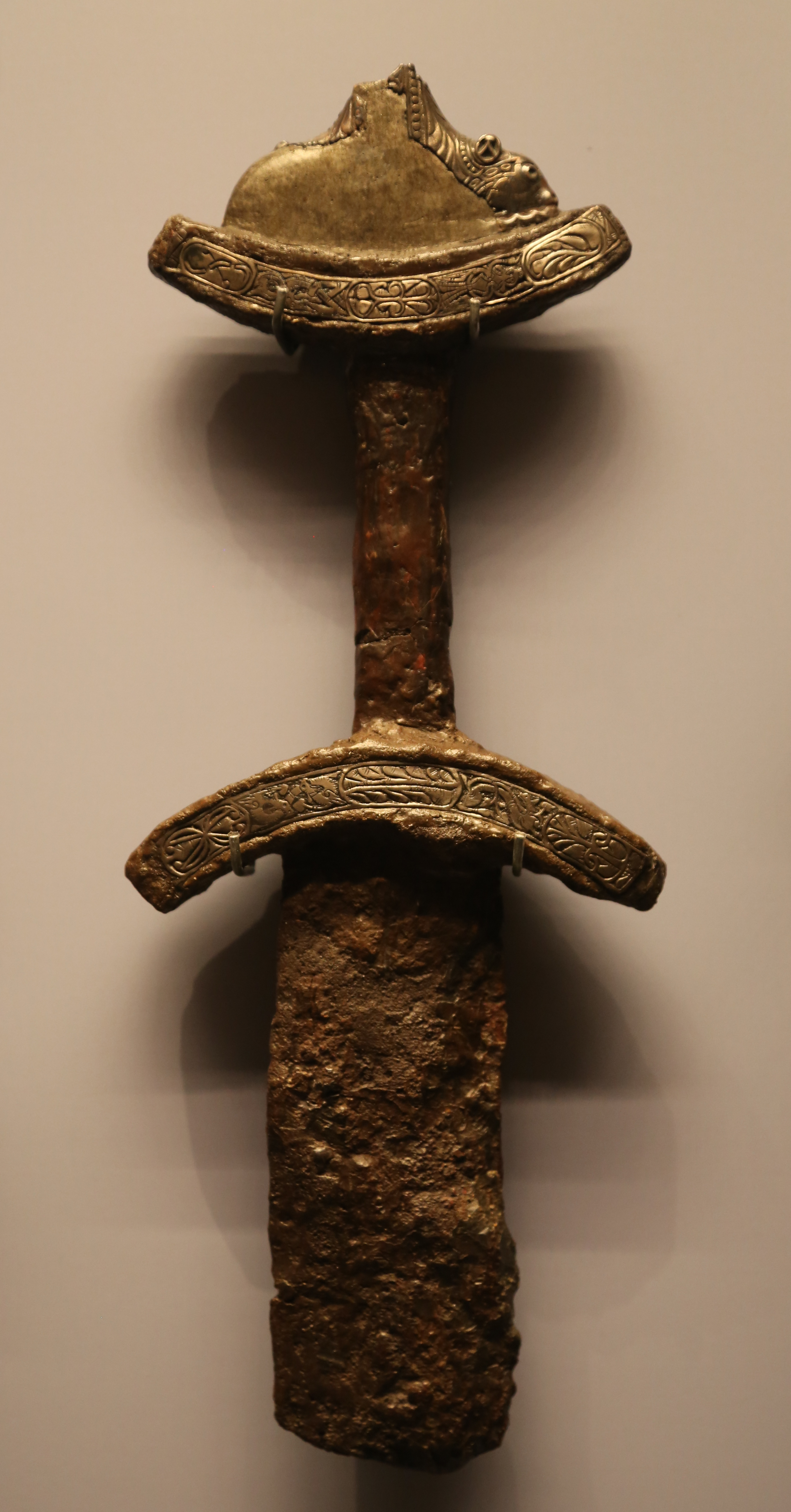
The Abingdon Sword, found near Abingdon, Oxfordshire; the hilt decoration is typical of ninth-century English metalwork

Rather than being able to melt the iron ore into a complete billet, the furnaces of the period were only able to produce small pieces of iron, which were subsequently forge welded into a single blade. To accomplish this, the pieces would either be beaten into thin sheets that were then hammered together as a laminated blade or placed together as thin rods and then welded together. Additionally, some of these blades were constructed using pattern welding. With this method, the iron was beaten into strips, which were twisted together and then forge welded. The twisting removed much surface slag, which could cause weaknesses in the finished blade. Pattern welding also produced patterns in the finished blade, most commonly a herringbone pattern. Such patterns are often referenced in Anglo-Saxon literature—they are described using terms such as brogenmæl ('weaving marks'), wundenmæl ('winding marks'), grægmæl ('grey mark'), and scirmæl ('brightly patterned'). Therefore, Pollington stated that the decoration produced by pattern-welding was important and desired in Anglo-Saxon society. Many blades also had a fuller, which was a shallow groove that ran the length of the blade. The fuller reduced the blade's overall weight while not compromising the thickness. Fullers were produced by hammering into the blade or chiselling out a section.

A few swords bore runic inscriptions—a sixth-century example found at Gilton in Kent had an inscription saying that "Sigimer Made This Sword." Textual sources indicate that swords were sometimes given names, such as the Hrunting sword from Beowulf. On some swords from the sixth century onward, rings were attached to the upper guard or pommel, many of which were ornamented. These rings sometimes served a practical purpose—for example, a soldier could tie a cord to the ring and subsequently hang the sword from their wrist. This practice is attested in later Viking sagas. In other cases, however, ring knobs were used and it was impossible to hang the sword in this manner. Therefore, ring knobs were likely symbolic or ritualistic.

In Old English, the scabbard was known as a scēaþ ('sheath'), although the term fætels also appears in Anglo-Saxon literature and may have had the same meaning. The scabbard itself was typically made of wood or leather, and the inside was often lined with fleece or fur. The inside might have also been greased or oiled to prevent the sword from rusting. Some scabbards were further protected by a metal binding at their neck (known as a frog or locket) and a chape at the bottom. A bead of glass, amber, crystal, or meerschaum was attached by a small strap to the neck of some scabbards. There are examples of similar beads from Iron Age Germanic regions of continental Europe, and it is likely that they were adopted from the Huns during the fifth century. The beads may have been used for amuletic purposes—later Icelandic sagas reference swords with "healing stones" attached, and these stones may be the same as Anglo-Saxon beads.

The sword and scabbard were suspended from either a baldric on the shoulder or from a belt on the waist. The former method was evidently popular in early Anglo-Saxon England, but the latter gained popularity in the later Anglo-Saxon period. For example, the Bayeux Tapestry only depicts the use of belts for sword carrying.

The weight of these swords, along with descriptions of them in literature like The Battle of Maldon, indicates that they were used primarily for cutting and slashing rather than thrusting. Several Anglo-Saxon corpses were apparently injured or killed in this manner; the cemetery of Eccles in Kent contains three individuals who had sword cuts to the left sides of their skulls.

=== Knives ===
In Old English, the term for knife was seax. This term applied to single-edged knives that had a blade length of 8 and 31 cm (3 and 12 in), and to the "long-seax" (or single-edged swords) which had a blade length of 54 to 76 cm (21 to 30 in). Archaeologists and historians have sometimes referred to the seax as a scramsax, although this term is not found in any medieval literature save for Gregory of Tours' History of the Franks. In this writing, Gregory mentions that a scramsax was used to assassinate the sixth-century Frankish king Sigibert. Early forms of the seax are common in fifth-century Frankish graves, and evidently it was not until later that they gained popularity in England. Thus, the seax is primarily associated with the Franks.

The knife was primarily used for domestic purposes, although it could be used in battle—some warriors used a mid to large-sized scramsax instead of a sword. This scramsax knife was different from other knives; it had a unique length and single cutting edge. It varied in length from 4–20 in (10–51 cm), and typically had a long wood (but occasionally iron) handle.

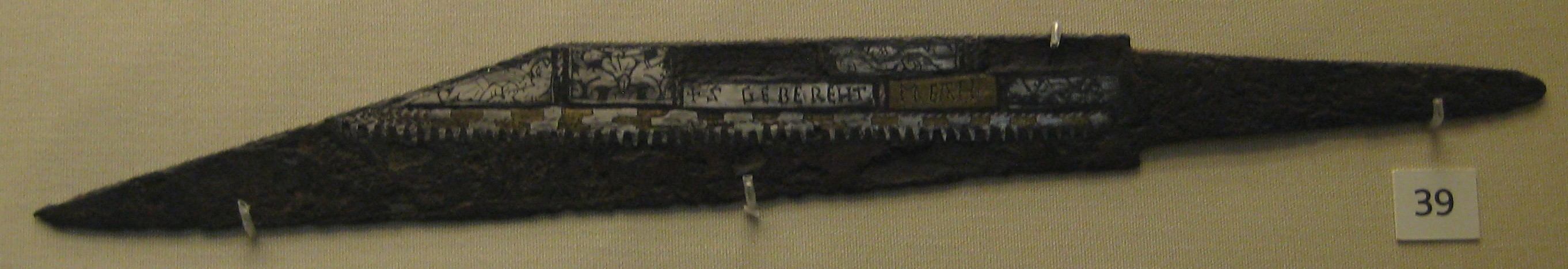
Broken-back seax from Sittingbourne, Kent, inscribed with "☩ BIORHTELM ME ÞORTE" ("Biorhtelm made me") and "☩ S[I]GEBEREHT ME AH" ("S[i]gebereht owns me")

Six main types of Anglo-Saxon knife have been identified, based on blade shapes. Anglo-Saxon seaxes were commonly constructed using pattern-welding, even in late Anglo-Saxon England when this practice had become uncommon for swords. The blades were sometimes decorated with incised lines or metal inlays, and a number of examples contain inscriptions bearing the name of the owner or maker. The seax was kept in a leather sheath, the sheaths themselves sometimes being decorated with embossed designs and silver or bronze fittings. Evidence from graves suggests that the sheath was belted to the carrier, with the hilt on the right-hand side of the body.

Apparently, most Anglo-Saxon men and women carried knives to prepare food and perform other domestic activities. In a conflict, however, a knife could have been used to kill an already wounded enemy, or they could have been used in a brawl. Pollington suggested that the longer seaxes could be considered a weapon, while the shorter ones were general-purpose tools. Underwood proposed that the long-seax was used for hunting rather than warfare, citing a Frankish pictorial calendar which featured two men killing a boar, one man wielding a long-seax. David Gale suggests that they were more of a status symbol, pointing out that the shorter, common seaxes were "both too small and too highly ornamented for everyday functional use." He concludes that they may well have been used by hunters, suggesting that in time they evolved from a symbol of "the hunting man" to "the mark of a freeman." Sonia Chadwick Hawkes concurs with Gale's assessment, mentioning that he had performed a practical demonstration of the "total ineffectiveness [of the seax] against both spear and sword" at a conference in Oxford in January 1987.

=== Axes ===
In Old English, axes were referred to as æces, from which the Modern English word derives. Most axes found in early Anglo-Saxon graves were fairly small with straight or slightly curved blades. Such hand-axes primarily served as tools rather than weapons, but could have been used as the latter if the need arose. Fragments of the wood shafts survive in only a few examples, thus causing considerable difficulty in ascertaining the overall size of the weapon.

Several examples of the francisca, or throwing axe, have been found in England. Such weapons can be distinguished from domestic hand axes by the curved shape of their heads. Two main forms of throwing axes have been identified in England—one type had a convex edge, and the other type had an S-shaped edge. However, axes have been discovered that do not clearly fit into either category. Writing in the sixth century CE, Roman author Procopius described the use of such throwing axes by the Franks, noting that they would be hurled at the enemy prior to engaging in hand-to-hand combat. In his History of the Franks, the Frankish chronicler Gregory of Tours (also writing in the sixth century) described the throwing of an axe at the enemy. It is from the Franks that the term francisca originated. However, various medieval authors used the term to refer to hand axes as well as throwing axes. The archaeological record indicates that the throwing axe was no longer in use by the seventh century, and it does not appear in the Frankish Ripuarian Law. This decline in usage may indicate the rise of more sophisticated battle formations. However, it again entered into use in the eighth and ninth centuries, upon its adoption by the Vikings.

=== Bows and arrows ===
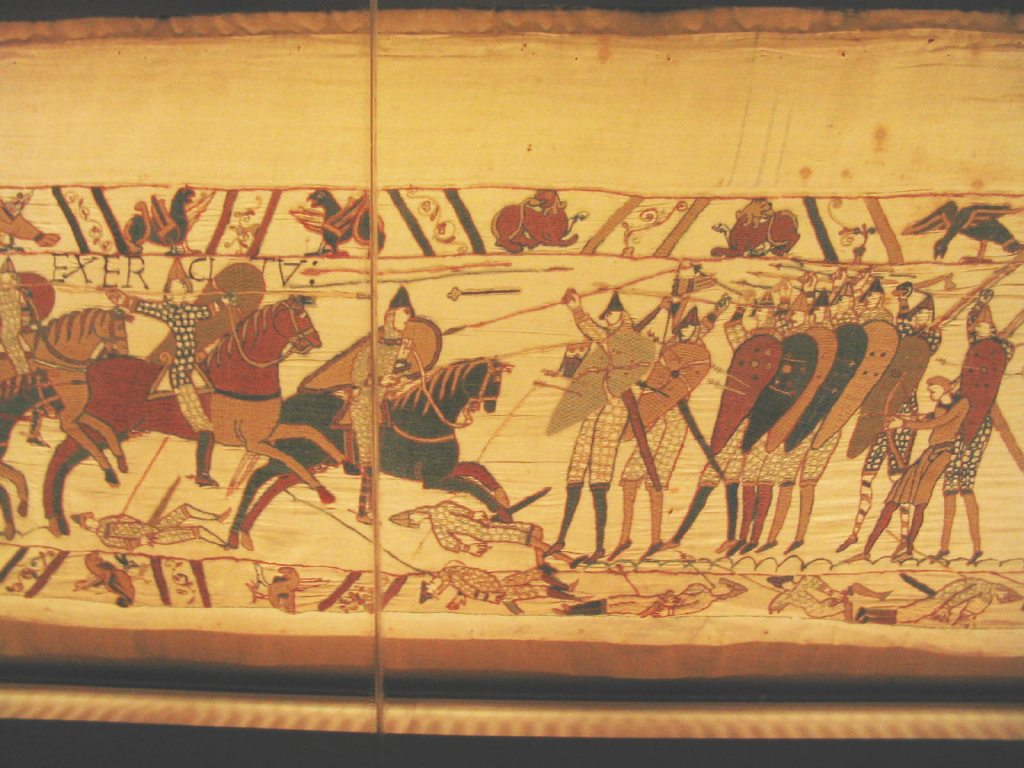
The Bayeux Tapestry's depiction of Norman cavalry charging an Anglo-Saxon shield wall during the Battle of Hastings in 1066.

Examples of Anglo-Saxon archery equipment are rare. Iron arrowheads have been discovered in approximately 1% of early Anglo-Saxon graves, and traces of wood from the bow stave are occasionally found in the soil of inhumations. In the rare case of the Chessel Down cemetery on the Isle of Wight, arrows and a bow were included as grave goods. It is possible that other arrows were fire-hardened or tipped with organic materials such as bone and antler, and as a result have not survived in graves. Given that neither bow staves nor arrows were likely to survive in the soils of England (both being made of wood), it is likely that they were interred as grave goods more often than it appears. In Old English, the bow was known as a boga.

In neighbouring regions of continental Europe with different soil types, archery equipment are more common finds. Around forty bow staves and various arrows were uncovered at Nydam Mose in Denmark, dating to the third or fourth century CE. Similar equipment was discovered at Thorsberg moor in Germany. From such continental evidence, it has been asserted that long bows were common in Northwestern Europe during the early medieval period. Long bow staves were constructed from a single piece of wood, and the string was made of hair or animal gut. Underwood suggested that the maximum shooting distance of an Anglo-Saxon bow would have been about 150 to 200 metres (500 to 650 feet). However, he also noted that the power of the arrow would have been greatly diminished beyond 100 to 120 metres (325 to 400 feet), and it only would have caused relatively minor wounds.

Anglo-Saxon arrowheads have been divided into three main types. The first group is leaf-shaped arrowheads, which typically contained a socket that allowed the head to be attached to the wooden shaft. The second group consists of bodkins. The third group is barbed arrowheads, which usually had a tang that was driven into the shaft or tied to it. Underwood suggested that the leaf-shaped and barbed arrowheads developed from arrows that were used for hunting. As for bodkins, he proposed that they were designed for use against armoured opponents—the long tapering point would pass through the chain links of mail or puncture the iron plate of a helmet if shot at close range. Due to the fact that arrowheads varied in size from 5.5 cm (2 inches) to 15.5 cm (6 inches), there is some degree of difficulty in distinguishing between the heads of large arrows and small javelins.

Although they are rarely found in graves, bows appear more frequently in Anglo-Saxon art and literature. On the eighth-century Northumbrian Franks Casket, an archer is shown defending a hall from a group of warriors. There are twenty-nine archers depicted on the eleventh-century Bayeux Tapestry. Twenty-three these appear in the lower margin, and six are shown in the main scene. However, only one archer is an Anglo-Saxon—the remainder are Norman. Pollington theorized that Anglo-Saxons primarily used the bow to hunt, and Underwood believes that most men would have known how to use it for this purpose.

=== Slings ===
There is little evidence for the use of slings as weaponry—they were normally depicted as hunting tools. In Old English, the sling was known as a liðere or liðera, and sometimes as a stæfliðere ('staff-pouch'). The Vita Sancti Wilfrithi (an eighth-century hagiography of Saint Wilfrid) records an event in which the saint and his companions were attacked by pagans when their ship ran aground. One of the companions launched a stone from a sling, killing the pagan priest. As for hunting, however, the Bayeux Tapestry depicts a man hunting birds using a sling. Underwood suggests that except for use as a last resort, the sling was not regarded as a weapon of war. Furthermore, he proposed that the event recorded in Wilfrid's hagiography may not be an accurate account, but rather a reflection of the writer's desire to draw Biblical parallels.

== Armour and defensive equipment ==
=== Shield ===
The shield was another extremely common piece of war equipment used by the Anglo-Saxons—nearly 25% of male Anglo-Saxon graves contain shields. In Old English, a shield was called a bord, rand, scyld, or lind ("linden-wood"). Anglo-Saxon shields comprised a circular piece of wood constructed from planks which had been glued together; at the center of the shield, an iron boss was attached. It was common for shields to be covered in leather, so as to hold the planks together, and they were often decorated with fittings of bronze or iron. Textual descriptions and visual representations indicate that some shields were convex, but archaeological evidence for this has not yet been found. No painted Anglo-Saxon shields have been discovered; however, painted shields from the same time period have been found in Denmark, and Beowulf describes shields as being "bright" and "yellow." These pieces of evidence suggest that some Anglo-Saxon shields may have been painted.

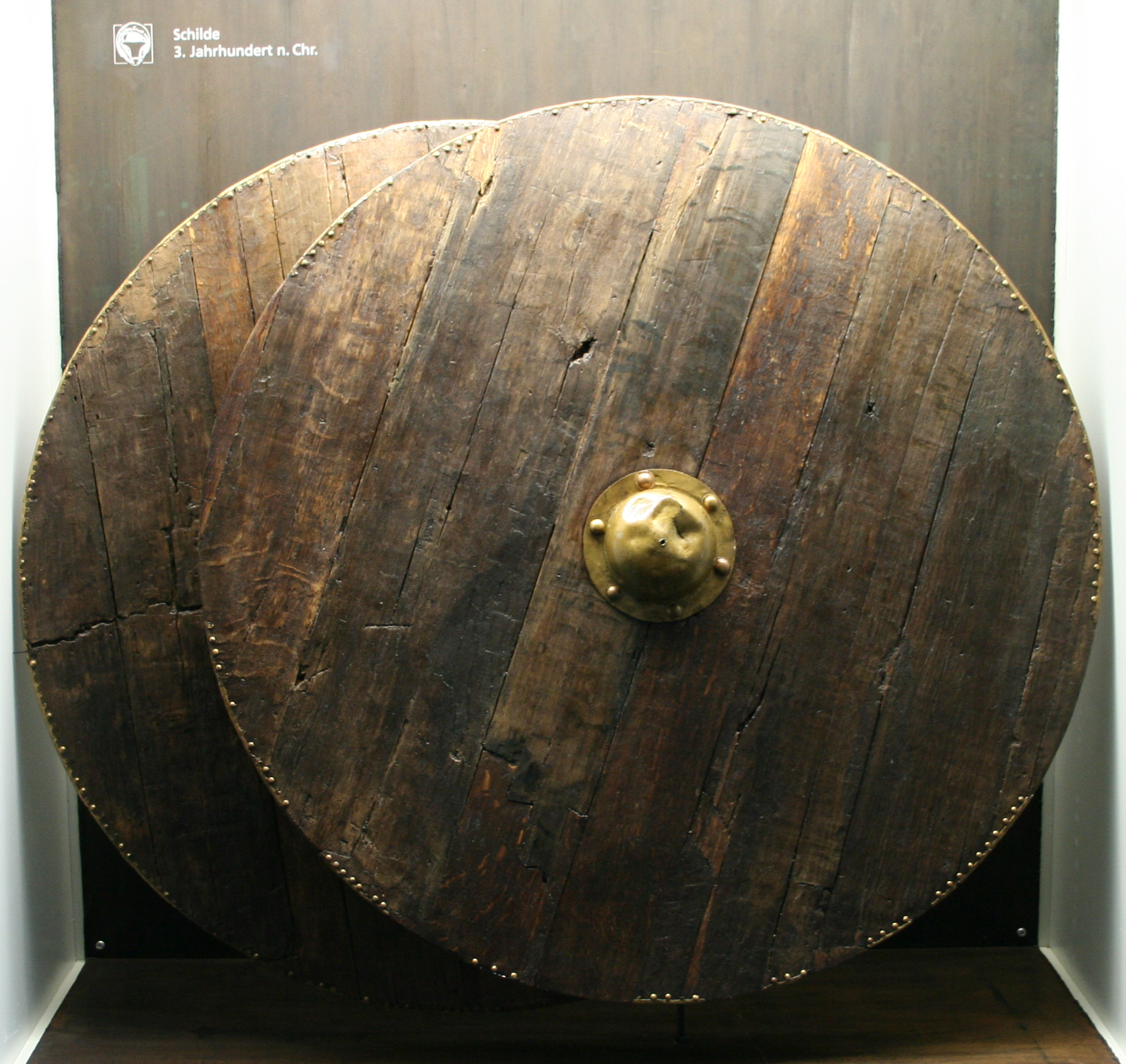
Two round, wooden shields from Thorsberg moor; dating to the 3rd century CE, they are similar to the shields used by the Anglo-Saxons

Old English poetry always states that shields were made of lime (linden-wood), but few actual examples have been found by archaeologists. Evidence indicates that alder, willow, and poplar wood were the most common types; shields of maple, birch, ash, and oak have also been discovered. The diameter of shields greatly varied, ranging from 0.3 to 0.92 m (1 to 3 ft), although most shields were between 0.46 to 0.66 m (1 ft 6 in to 2 ft 2 in) in diameter. Their thickness ranged from 5–13 mm (0.20–0.51 in), but most were between 6–8 mm (0.24–0.31 in) in width.

Anglo-Saxon shield bosses have been separated into two main categories, based on the method of manufacturing. The carinated boss was the most common type—the design originated in continental Europe, and such bosses found in England date from the fifth to the mid-seventh century, at least. It is unclear exactly how carinated bosses were manufactured. The other type is the tall cone boss, which was commonly used from the seventh century onward. These bosses were constructed of an iron sheet (or sheets), and were welded together from the rim to the apex. Iron or bronze rivets were then used to attach the boss to the shield; four or five rivets were most commonly used, although as many as twelve were used in some instances. Behind the boss, the shield was cut and an iron grip was attached to the opening, so that the shield could be held. Grips were usually 10 to 16 cm (4 to 6 in) in length, the sides of which were either straight or gently curved. Evidence indicates that flanges were sometimes used to enclose a wooden handle.

As for defensive equipment, most Anglo-Saxon warriors only had access to shields. Pollington theorized that the shield was "perhaps the most culturally significant piece of defensive equipment" in Anglo-Saxon England, for the shield-wall would have symbolically represented the separation between the two sides on the battlefield. Smaller shields were lighter and easier to manoeuver, and therefore were best used in minor skirmishes and hand-to-hand combat. In contrast, larger shields were most commonly used in full-scale battles—they would have provided better protection from projectiles and were needed to construct a shield wall.

=== Mail ===
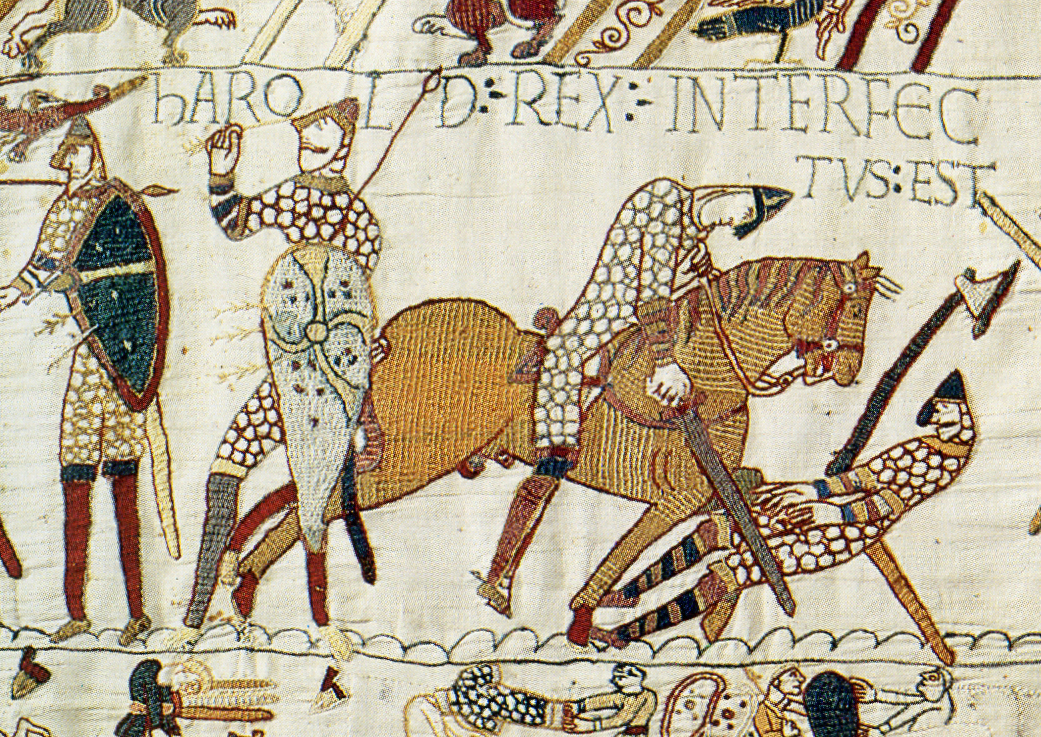
Scene from the Bayeux Tapestry showing Norman and Anglo-Saxon soldiers in coats of mail

In Old English, mail armour was referred to as byrne or hlenca. It is frequently referred to in late Anglo-Saxon literature, but few examples have been found archaeologically. The only known complete Anglo-Saxon mailcoat was discovered in the cemetery at Sutton Hoo in Suffolk, but it is severely damaged by corrosion. Therefore, the scarcity of archaeological examples may simply be due to the widespread corrosion of mail. A completely intact coat of mail from the fourth or fifth century, similar to those that probably were used in Anglo-Saxon England, was found in Vimose, Denmark, which has been rebuilt by archaeologist Marjin Wijnhoven.

The coat of mail found at Sutton Hoo comprised iron rings 8 mm (0.31 in) in diameter. Some rings were filled in with copper rivets, indicating that the coat was made of alternate rows of riveted and forged rings. When worn, the coat probably extended to the hip. The manufacture of a mailcoat would have first required the production of a thin metal wire, via swaging or drawing. The wire was then tightly coiled around a circular ring approximately 10 mm (0.39 in) in diameter. The smith would then chisel any individual circuits off the rod, reheat it, and anneal it. Finally, the rings were joined together and closed using welding and riveting. Following construction, the coat was case hardened by being packed in charcoal and subsequently reheated, so that some carbon could transfer to the metal's outer face.

Mail would have greatly protected a warrior in battles by reducing the impact of enemy blows, and therefore those who wore mail had a significant advantage over opponents who did not. They were particularly effective against cuts by a sword or axe, since the impact was absorbed and distributed across the many rings. However, mail was less effective at preventing spear injuries—the concentrated force of spears could break a few links and allow the spear to enter the body, sometimes causing the rings to enter with it. Mailcoats added a great deal of weight to the warrior and made mobility more difficult; therefore, wearers of mailcoats were greatly disadvantaged in skirmishes and fast-moving battle lines. Mail also rusted easily, and had to be maintained as a result.

=== Helmets ===
The Old English word for helmet was helm. In battle, helmets would have served to protect the wearer's head from enemy blows. Evidence indicates that helmets were never common in Anglo-Saxon England, although their usage may have increased by the eleventh century. Cnut the Great issued an edict in 1008 which required that warriors in active service possess a helmet. In that same year, Aethelred the Unready ordered the manufacture of helmets. The Bayeux Tapestry reflects the idea that helmets were a standard piece of military equipment for an Anglo-Saxon army by 1066. Late Anglo-Saxon literature, such as Beowulf, also makes some references to helmets. Four mostly intact Anglo-Saxon helmets have been discovered, although archaeologists have unearthed additional fragments of what might have been helmets. All the helmets which have been found are substantially different from the others in their construction and ornamentation. It is possible that most helmets were made of boiled leather and therefore did not physically survive.

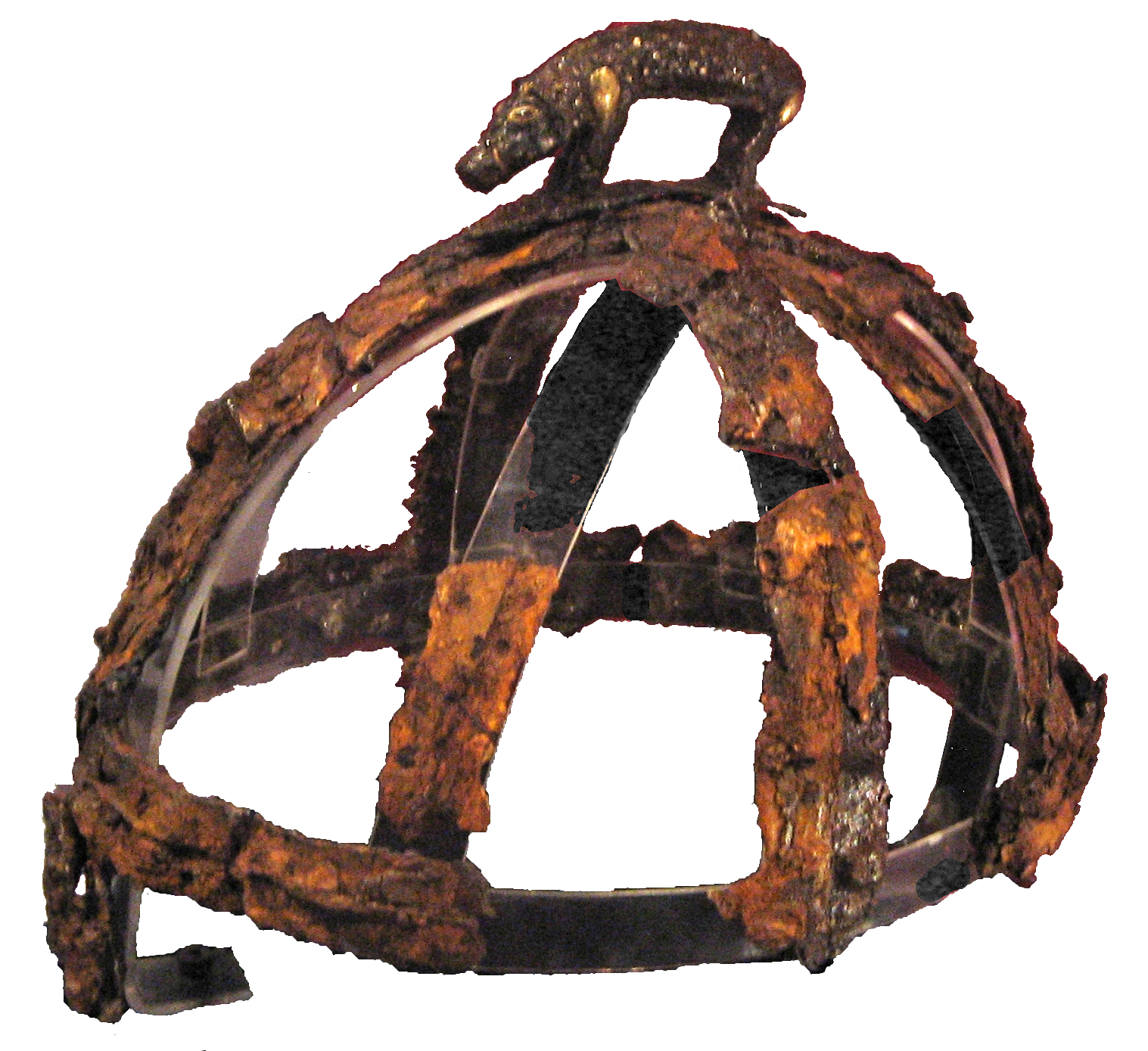
The Benty Grange Helmet on display in the Weston Park Museum

The earliest known example was found at Sutton Hoo, an elite burial from the seventh century. However, the helmet itself could date as early as the first quarter of the sixth century. The helmet's bowl comprises one piece of metal, and attached to it are cheek pieces, a metal neck guard, and a face mask. The helmet is elaborately decorated; a winged dragon on the face plate soars upwards to confront a two-headed dragon running along the crest, while embossed foil sheets of tinned bronze, forming five different designs, cover nearly the entire helmet. The decorations on the helmet are similar to others found in England, as well as Germany and Scandinavia. The helmet itself bears similarity to helmets found at Vendel and Valsgärde in Sweden, leading to speculation that it was made in Sweden or by a Swedish craftsman who lived in England. Possible fragments of helmet crests similar to the one at Sutton Hoo have been discovered in Rempstone, Nottinghamshire, and in Icklingham, Suffolk—this suggests that these helmets may have been more common than the evidence indicates.

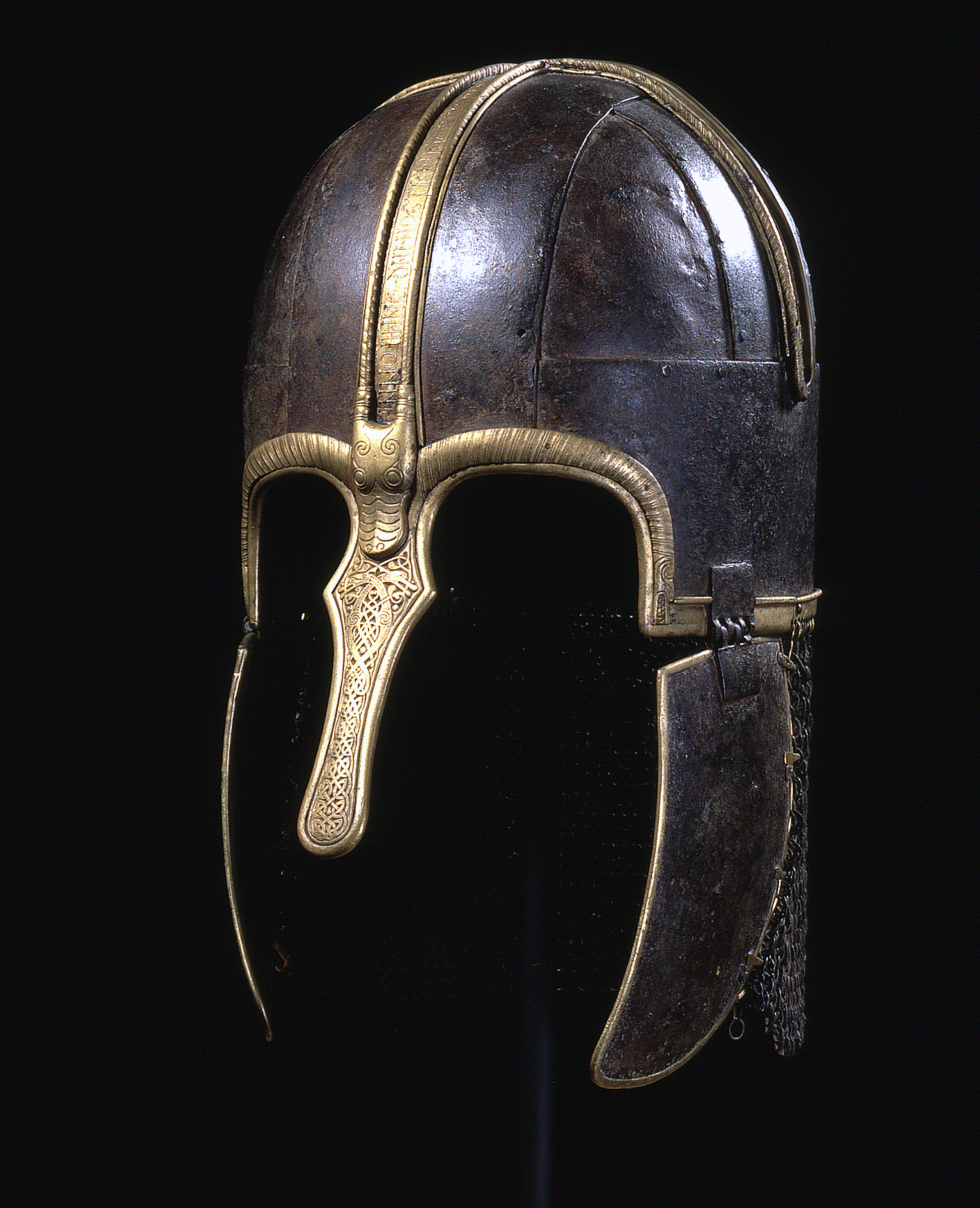
The Coppergate Helmet

Boar crested helmets have been found such as the mid-seventh century Benty Grange helmet, discovered in 1848 by Thomas Bateman at Benty Grange, Derbyshire. The frame comprises seven pieces of iron, and the helmet is crested with a bronze boar figure—the figure is decorated with garnet eyes mounted in beaded gold, along with gilded, inlayed tusks and ears. In Guilden Morden, Cambridgeshire, another bronze boar was discovered at a female grave. The boar was apparently a helmet crest, but no other helmet pieces were found there; therefore, the crest may have been detached from the helmet before being buried. There is also a boar crest on the Pioneer Helmet, unearthed in Wollaston, Northamptonshire, although this boar was made with iron.

The Coppergate helmet, from the middle to late eighth century, was found in a Viking settlement in York, but the helmet itself was made by the Angles. Iron plates were used to construct the helmet bowl—iron cheek-pieces were hinged to the sides, and curtain of mail was attached at the back of the helmet for neck protection. The nasal plate, interlaced with engravings of animals, extended over the eyebrows and ended in small canine designs at the head. At the two helmet crests, there are Latin inscriptions praising the Christian Trinity.

== Manufacture of weapons ==
According to Underwood, any smith could have manufactured basic weapons, such as spearheads and knives. However, he proposed that a specialist was required to manufacture swords and many other weapons. Archaeologists have discovered some Anglo-Saxon smith's tools—a set of tools from the seventh century, which included an anvil, hammers, tongs, a file, shears, and punches, was discovered in a grave at Tattershall Thorpe in Lincolnshire.

Artistic elements of Anglo-Saxon weapons are greatly similar to weapon art found in other parts of northern Europe and Scandinavia, indicating that these regions were in continual contact with one another. Some external developments were adapted by the English, but it is clear that developments from England also influenced continental civilizations. For instance, the ring-sword was evidently created in Kent in the mid-500s, but by the seventh century it had become widespread across Europe, being used by Germanic-speaking peoples as well as in Finland and the Kingdom of the Lombards.
