= Hrunting =

One of the swords used by Beowulf

Hrunting was a sword given to Beowulf by Unferth in the ancient Old English epic poem Beowulf. Beowulf used it in battle against Grendel's mother.

Beowulf is described receiving the sword in lines 1455–1458:

And another item lent by Unferth
at that moment of need was of no small importance:
the brehon handed him a hilted weapon,
a rare and ancient sword named Hrunting.
The iron blade with its ill-boding patterns
had been tempered in blood. It had never failed
the hand of anyone who hefted it in battle,
anyone who had fought and faced the worst
in the gap of danger. This was not the first time
it had been called to perform heroic feats.

However, although the sword possessed great power and was claimed to have never failed anyone who used it, when Beowulf descended to the bottom of the lake to fight Grendel's mother, the sword proved ineffective. As the "fabulous powers of that heirloom failed", Beowulf was forced to discard it.

== Hrunting's significance ==
Swords have great significance in the war-centred Anglo-Saxon culture from which Beowulf arises. Therefore, emphasis is strongly placed on the exchange of weapons of war. Weapons such as swords circulated through Anglo-Saxon society as inheritance through family, birthed through the monsters, found under magic rocks, and as rewards between lords and their subjects. Occasionally such exchange was also seen between warriors. One example of a weapon as a gift is seen in the exchange of Hrunting. As Unferth passes his sword to Beowulf, he admits the loss of his glory, and his submission to this greater warrior. However, when Hrunting fails Beowulf in his battle against Grendel's mother, it possibly reflects its previous owner, Unferth, who failed to defeat the hated Grendel. In addition, Beowulf's defeat of Grendel prompts the Danish king Hrothgar to bestow upon him many gifts consisting of weapons; this further emphasizes the importance of weaponry to such a society. Beowulf then passes on his rewards to his king Hygelac, thereby establishing his obligation to his king. Hrunting's various meanings demonstrate that weapons of war can carry not only positive, but also negative, significance.

== Symbolism of Hrunting ==
Unferth's very act of giving Hrunting to Beowulf and the sword's unexpected failure in the battle against Grendel's mother bear much symbolism in the poem. Given that Unferth shows his dislike for Beowulf early in the story, Unferth's choice to award Beowulf with Hrunting can be interpreted as a sign of peace and acceptance. In this light, the giving of the sword seems to be an indication of Unferth's recognition of Beowulf as a capable and powerful warrior. On the other hand, the poem portrays Unferth as a sly and treacherous man. Furthermore, scholars even propose that Hrunting is "the very sword with which [Unferth] slew his own kin". It is possible then that Unferth's motive in giving away his sword upon being confronted with the problem of Grendel's mother could very well be to avoid going into battle. The passing of Hrunting from Unferth's hand to Beowulf is therefore a reflection of Unferth's treachery as he abandons his role as a warrior of Heorot. At first glance, Unferth's sudden act of generosity towards Beowulf appears to have been done for noble reasons. However, what is known about Unferth and the sword's inefficacy in battle strongly suggest that Unferth's intentions are cowardly rather than noble – something reinforced by the similarly equivocal role played by the sword's "hafted" counterpart in Grettis Saga.

== Hrunting's failure ==
The reason behind Hrunting's failing against Grendel's mother has been a point of much scholarly debate. J.L. Rosier, in A Design for Treachery: The Unferth Intrigue, puts forth the contention that Unferth deliberately gave Beowulf a sword that he knew would fail, possibly for the purpose of preventing Beowulf from succeeding where Unferth himself failed. Yet this point has been contested by J.D.A Oglivy, who notes that the poem itself offers another explanation. First, Oglivy notes that if Unferth supplied an inferior weapon then it doesn't follow for the poet to have gone into extensive detail about the magical infallibility of the sword. Further, as the sword that Beowulf ultimately finds and slays Grendel's Mother with is noted to be made by giants, it implies that Grendel's line possesses magical invulnerability that prevents weapons made by man from harming them. Moreover, where Heaney's translation says, in line 1527, "Here at last", other translations, such as those of David Wright, Michael Alexander, Constance B. Heatt, J.R.R. Tolkien, et al., rendered the phrase "wæs forma sið" – "For the first time" Hrunting failed to strike an effective blow; so that Unferth would not have expected it to fail.

Another explanation that has been put forth connects Hrunting's failure to the broader underlying message of Christianity prevalent throughout the poem. Kent Gould, in his essay "Beowulf" and Folktale Morphology: God as Magical Donor, suggests that Hrunting fails because it was given to Beowulf by Unferth, a heathen. Only the more powerful replacement blade that God gives Beowulf is capable of destroying evil. According to Gould, "the message would be clear enough to the poem's Christian audience: only God can contribute enough power to overcome enemies to whom the poem has elsewhere given a Scriptural history". Grendel and Grendel's mother have such a history, as Grendel's lineage is described in lines 106–108 to have descended from Cain.

== See also ==
- Nægling, another sword used by Beowulf
- Ulfberht swords
