= Carrick =

Carrick is an Anglicised version of creag/carraig, Gaelic for "rock", and may refer to:

== People ==
- Carrick (surname)
- Donnchadh, Earl of Carrick (died 1250), Scottish Mormaer and first Earl of Carrick
- Marjorie of Carrick (1256–1292), mother of Robert the Bruce and Countess of Carrick
- Niall of Carrick (died 1256), Scottish Mormaer and second Earl of Carrick

== Places ==
=== Australia ===
- Carrick, New South Wales
- Carrick, Tasmania

=== Canada ===
- Carrick, Ontario, part of South Bruce, Ontario since 1999
- Carrick, Manitoba, a community within the Rural Municipality of Piney

=== Ireland (Republic) ===
==== County Westmeath ====
- Carrick, County Westmeath (civil parish), a civil parish in the barony of Fartullagh, County Westmeath
- Carrick, Fartullagh, a townland in the civil parish of Carrick, barony of Fartullagh, County Westmeath
- Carrick, Lackan, a townland in the civil parish of Lackan, barony of Corkaree, County Westmeath
- Carrick, Noughaval, a townland in the civil parish of Noughaval, barony of Kilkenny West, County Westmeath
- Carrick, St Mary's, a townland in the civil parish of St Mary's, barony of Fore, County Westmeath

==== Elsewhere in the Republic of Ireland ====
- Carrick, County Donegal, a village
- Carrick, County Kildare, a civil parish
- Carrick-on-Shannon, a town in County Leitrim
- Carrick Mountain, a mountain in County Wicklow
- Carrick-on-Suir, a town in County Tipperary
- Carrick, Killygordon, a townland in County Donegal

=== United Kingdom ===
- Carrick, Cornwall, a former local government district
- Carrick Heaths, a Site of Special Scientific Interest in Cornwall
- Carrick Roads, an estuary in Cornwall, 3rd largest deep-water natural harbour in the world
- Carrick, Scotland
- Carrick Castle (village) in Argyll and Bute, Scotland
- Carrick, County Armagh, a townland in County Armagh, Northern Ireland
- Carrick, County Fermanagh, a townland in County Fermanagh, Northern Ireland
- Carrick, County Londonderry, a civil parish and townland in County Londonderry, Northern Ireland
- Carrick, County Tyrone, a townland in County Tyrone, Northern Ireland
- Carrick (Northern Ireland Parliament constituency)

=== United States ===
- Carrick, California
- Carrick (Pittsburgh), Pennsylvania

== Titles ==
- Earl of Carrick, title of a medieval Scottish provincial ruler
- Earl of Carrick (Ireland), title in the peerage of Ireland

== Other uses ==
- City of Adelaide (1864), also known as HMS Carrick, a clipper ship
- Carrick bend, a knot
- Carrick Church, located in County Fermanagh, Northern Ireland
- Carrack-class light cruiser, a fictional ship class in Star Wars video games

== See also ==
- Carrack, a type of mediaeval sailing ship
