= English-language editions of The Hobbit =

This list contains only complete, printed English-language editions of The Hobbit by J. R. R. Tolkien. It is not for derived or unprinted works such as screenplays, graphic novels, or audio books.

== Introduction ==
For this list, a printing is a separate edition if any of the following criteria is met:

- The publisher declares it to be a new edition.
- Substantial changes to the text have been introduced beyond correcting typographical errors.
- A publisher prints the basic design for the first time.
- The dust jacket or cover design has changed appreciably.
- The height or width of the book has changed.
- The binding materials have changed.

For this list, a printing is a variant of a separate edition if both it is not a separate edition itself and also any of the following criteria is met:

- Inconspicuous marks or annotations declare it to be from a different publisher than an edition it is otherwise identical to (e.g., book club edition).
- Some internal illustrations appear as color instead of black-and-white, or vice versa.
- Some small change has been made in the design of the book or its binding or dust jacket without affecting the whole design.

A printing is 'not' a separate edition or variant solely because of any of the following:

- Binding color changed.
- Dust jacket color scheme changed but design remained the same.
- Typographical errors were corrected.

Numbered pages means the page number of the last page of the story itself, regardless of whether the page number actually appears on the page. It does not include end papers or advertisement pages, even if they are numbered.

== List of editions ==
No.	Identifier	Description	Variants
1	AU1937	George Allen & Unwin LTD of London, 1937 Light green cloth binding over boards, imprinted with stylized Misty Mountains scene in deep blue ink along the top, all the way around, and a dragon at the bottom, both front and back. Dust jacket in green, black, dark blue, and white, showing a drawing of stylized mountains with the moon and eagles soaring above, a forest, and a river. End paper maps in red, black, and white. All artwork by Tolkien. 14.0 × 19.6 cm, 310 numbered pages.	1. Second printing (1937) converted four plates to color.
2	HM1938	Houghton Mifflin Co. of Boston & New York, 1938. Tan cloth binding over boards, imprinted with a bowing hobbit in red to the upper right of the title on the front. Dust jacket in blue with the Hobbiton frontispiece in color in front. Title page shows outline of the same bowing hobbit as on the cover. All artwork by Tolkien. No half-title page. Chapter VII mis-labeled as Chapter VI; List of Illustrations mistakenly lists Thror's map to be at the front, where the text declares it to be. 15.1 × 21.0 cm, 310 numbered pages.	1. Title page bowing hobbit insignia was changed to the publisher's device of a seated flautist in second printing. Date unknown. Half-title page added. List of Illustrations places Thrór's map at rear.; 2. Chapter VII heading corrected from "Chapter VI". Date unknown.; 3. Buckram style "C", and maps on roughly calendered stock. Date unknown.; 4. Buckram style "D", and maps on roughly calendered stock. Date unknown.; 5. Orange library binding, silk screen of original American dust jacket in black outline. Binding may apply to any printing.
3	AU1942	George Allen & Unwin LTD of London, 1942. Similar to AU1937 but smaller. Color plates have been removed except for the frontispiece. 13.0 × 19.0 cm, 310 numbered pages.	
4	CB1942	The Children's Book Club of London, 1942. Same sheets as AU1942 but no maps and no frontispiece. Yellow cloth over boards, title on spine only. Dust jacket in white and orange, displaying a dandified hobbit. 13.0 × 18.8 cm, 310 numbered pages.	
5	AU1951	George Allen & Unwin LTD of London, 1951. Covers and dust jacket in same art as AU1937 but size has changed. Tolkien modified the story (particularly Riddles in the Dark) to match what The Lord of the Rings had evolved into. Color frontispiece; otherwise black-and-white illustrations, as with AU1942. This is the first printing of the second edition and the fifth printing overall. Printings through the 15th occasionally change printing signatures, correct typographical errors, and add advertising for other Tolkien books. 13.0 × 19.0 cm, 315 numbered pages.	
6	HM1951	Houghton Mifflin Co. of Boston and New York, 1951. Identical sheets, illustrations, and binding as AU1951. Only the spines of the book and dust jacket have changed to name the publisher.	
7	HM1954	Houghton Mifflin Co. of Boston and New York, 1954. Identical sheets and illustrations as the 6th UK printing (second printing of AU1951), but the binding reverted to a design similar to HM1938, only smaller and without the bowing hobbit insignia on the front cover. Unlike the corresponding UK edition, the American covers changed color roughly every printing, though samples can be found with sheets from one UK printing and binding color prevalent on a neighboring US printing. Unlike the UK impressions, most of the US printings of the second edition did not declare the impression on the reverse of the title page, making them difficult to identify. 13.0 × 19.0 cm, 315 numbered pages.	
8	PB1961	Penguin Books, 1961. (From the Puffin Books series.) Paperback with illustration of the adventurers in the Misty Mountains passes during the storm, by Pauline Baynes. All illustrations have been removed, and the maps are printed in black-and-white. 11 × 17.9 cm, 284 numbered pages.	
9	HM1964	Houghton Mifflin Co. of Boston, 1964? Covers and dust jacket similar to HM1954, but cover is light green and does not vary in successive printings. Color frontispiece removed, and the red from the end paper maps has changed to black. There is no color left within the book at all. These comprise the US 15th through 23rd printings, with sheets printed in the US. Format has enlarged to 13.8 × 21 cm. 315 numbered pages.	
10	BB1965	Ballantine Books, Inc., of New York, 1965. Paperback with fanciful illustration of Hobbiton in an oval frame with emus and a lion in the foreground. Cover art by Barbara Remington. Maps in black and white; no internal illustrations. 10.5 × 17.7 cm, 287 numbered pages.	1. On the 6th printing, Ballantine airbrushed out the lion on the cover because it greatly irritated Tolkien.
11	UB1966	Unwin Books of London, 1966. Paper jacket on stiff paper with Tolkien's color pencil illustration of Smaug over Lake Town. Maps in black and white; no other illustrations. 12.2 × 18.4 cm, 271 numbered pages.	
12	AU1966	Allen & Unwin of London, 1966. Cloth on boards. Similar in design and format to AU1937a, but this is the third edition and also the 16th impression counting from AU1937. As in AU1937a, four color plates, and end paper maps in black, white, and red. Similar dust-jacket to AU1937. 12.2 × 18.4 cm, 317 numbered pages.	
13	HM1968	Houghton Mifflin Company of Boston, 1968. Very similar in design and format to HM1965, but this is the third edition text based on AU1966. As in HM1965, no color illustrations, and maps in black and white. 13.8 × 21 cm, 317 numbered pages.	
14	HM1973	Houghton Mifflin Company of Boston, 1973. Forest green simulated leather boards with red and gold gilt runic inscription around the periphery in front and a stylized road-going-into-forest-in-front-of-mountains illustration in gold gilt a little above center. Matching slipcase in simulated leather with the same cover illustration on a paste-down in green, black, and yellow. Printed on heavy paper. All original illustrations from HM1938 restored, including color plates. Black-and-white illustrations printed as black-and-green, maps in black and green, and each page neatline is in green. 18 × 23.5 cm, 317 numbered pages.	1. Book-of-the-Month edition, distinguished by annotation on the copyright page.
15	BB1973	Ballantine Books, Inc., of New York, 1973. Continuation of BB1965. Cover art has changed to Tolkien's illustration of Bilbo Comes to the Huts of the Raft-elves.	
16	AU1976	George Allen & Unwin LTD, of London, 1976. Deluxe edition of The Hobbit. Gold inlaid dragon on black covers. Title page states George Allen & Unwin LTD, and the frontispiece is Tolkien's rendition of Hobbiton in color.	1. A variant binding, corresponding to FS1979, has been seen occasionally. The run may have been a mistake or contingency printing. The printing run seems to have been small.
17	HA1977	Harry N. Abrams, Inc., of New York, 1977. Illustrations by Lester Abrams et al., from the 1977 Rankin/Bass Productions, Inc., animated film. All illustrations in full color, some fold-out. Illustrations printed directly on the front and back boards: (front) the company in the Misty Mountains during the storm; (back) Smaug's treasure. Clear acetate jacket overlays the book title and author onto the boards' illustrations and augments the cover illustrations with Smaug's image. In the front, he's flying around the mountain to attack the company, even though the illustration is of the Misty Mountains, not the Lonely Mountain. On the rear, Smaug lies on his hoard. Bilbo's ghostly image appears in the foreground. 29.4 × 27.7 cm, 220 numbered pages.	
18	GP1978	Guild Publishing of London, 1978. Illustrations by Tolkien. 4th edition text. Burgundy, full imitation leather, elaborate gold gilt. No bookmark ribbon. Free end-paper maps in black, white, and red; other illustrations in black and white. No slipcase or dust jacket. 14.0 × 21.5 cm, 255 numbered pages.	
19	FS1979	The Folio Society of London, 1979. Illustrations by Eric Fraser. 3rd edition text. Burgundy leather quarter-bound with remainder in burgundy cloth on boards. Gold gilt "maze" pattern on front and spine. End-paper maps in black, white and red; other illustrations in black and white. Light gray-green slipcase. 15 × 22.8 cm, 245 numbered pages.	1. An edition in identical binding appeared with content apparently corresponding to the 1976 deluxe edition published by George Allen & Unwin LTD. See AU1976a.
20	BB1981	Ballantine Books, Inc., of New York, 1981. Continuation of BB1965. Cover art has changed to Darrell K. Sweet's illustration of The Lord of the Eagles.	
21	EP1984	Easton Press of Norwalk, Connecticut, 1984. Probably from the same sheets as HM1973 with margins trimmed. Frontispiece illustration by Michael Hague showing the company in the foreground and The Lonely Mountain in the background; otherwise all illustrations and maps are as described for HM1973. Full leather covers; ribbed spine; gold-leaf edges all around; tipped-in bookmark; gold gilt runic lettering on front cover. 14.8 × 22.5 cm, 317 numbered pages.	
22	BB1985	Ballantine Books, Inc., of New York, 1985. Continuation of BB1965. Cover art has reverted to Tolkien's illustration of Bilbo Comes to the Huts of the Raft-elves, but framed and shrunk down comparatively.	
23	HM1987	Houghton Mifflin Company of Boston, 1987. 50th Anniversary Edition. Similar in design to HM1973, but covers and slipcase are in gold instead of green, and the front cover illustration is a "50" in green. All monochrome illustrations, including maps, in gold and black instead of green and black. Color plates same as HM1973. Foreword by Christopher Tolkien describes the history of the writing and publication of The Hobbit.	1. Book-of-the-Month Club edition, distinguished by annotation on copyright page.
24	EL1987	ELT Publishing of Hamburg, 1987. Fourth Edition, 21st impression Unwin Paperbacks sheets bound by ELT. Paperback. Cover illustration by Jan Buchholz & Reni Hinsch.	
25	UH1988	Unwin Hyman of London etc., 1988. The Annotated Hobbit. Extensively annotated text by Douglas A. Anderson. Black cloth binding on boards. Purple dust jacket framed in black, with centerpiece title above a copy of the original dust jacket. Interior illustrations culled from most extant editions, especially foreign-language. Annotations include all significant changes to the text from the 1937 original. It also includes "The Quest of Erebor", first published in Unfinished Tales. 22.0 × 28.8 cm, 335 numbered pages.	
26	HM1988	Houghton Mifflin Company of Boston, 1988. American edition of UH1988. Blue paper binding on boards. Dust jacket is an enlargement of the original 1937 dust jacket. Interior same as UH1988.	
27	GB1989	Galahad Books of New York, 1989. Red cloth binding over boards. Smaller reprint of HA1977 with similar dust jacket art but on paper. 27.2 × 22.9 cm, 220 numbered pages.	
28	HM1989	Houghton Mifflin Company of Boston, 1989. Paperback. Illustrated by Michael Hague. Orange front cover lettered in green; illustrated with Smaug on his hoard. Purportedly the first softcover edition to be illustrated. 48 full-color scenes. 304 pages. ISBN 0-395-52021-5.	
29	FS1997	The Folio Society of London, 1997. Illustrations by Eric Fraser. 3rd edition text. Red vegetable parchment on boards. Gold gilt "celtic" pattern on outside, with block design by Francis Mosley featuring dragon head breathing fire on front. End-paper maps in black, white and brown; other illustrations in black and white. Burgundy slipcase. Caxton wove paper. 15 × 22.8 cm, 245 numbered pages.	
30	HM1997	Houghton Mifflin Company of Boston & New York, 1997. Paperback of 60th Anniversary Edition. Cover illustration by Alan Lee shows Gandalf and Bilbo standing beside a river with a bridge in the background. Cover design by Steve Cooley which is primarily colored dark orange. Included are Thror's Map on the first two facing pages and the Map of Wilderland on the last two facing pages. Notes on the text by Douglas A. Anderson, 7 December 1994. ISBN 0-618-00221-9. Available by itself or part of 4vo The Lord of the Rings box set. 4th printing. 272 numbered pages.	
31	HC1998	HarperCollins Publishers UK, 1998. Paperback with John Howe's Smaug illustration on front cover. Other illustrations by David Wyatt. New reset edition. Published in hardback in 1995. Preluded by a note on the text by Douglas A. Anderson. ISBN 978-0-00-675402-2. Published in the United States in 1999, ISBN 0-261-10221-4. 310 numbered pages.	
32	HC1999	HarperCollins Publishers UK, 1999. Leather-bound de luxe hardback edition in a slipcase. Front cover is plain black with a gold gilt image of the dragon in the center. Inside front cover (endpaper 1) there is the illustration of Mirkwood. Map of Wilderland on the inside rear cover (endpaper 2). 14.3 ×22.2 cm. ISBN 978-0-261-10257-6.	
33	HM2001	Houghton Mifflin Company of Boston, 2001. Edition for young readers features large margins and increased text size. Dust jacket features artwork by Peter Sis. On the front is a 3x3 grid of scenes from the story. On the back is Sis's version of Tolkien's Map of Wilderland. Text is based on Collins Modern Classics version of 1998 with some new corrections as explained in a note on the text by Douglas A. Anderson, May 2001. Book features Tolkien's black and white illustrations on the inside. Hardcover ISBN 0-618-16221-6. Paperback ISBN 0-618-15082-X. 330 numbered pages.	
34	HC2004	HarperCollins Publishers UK, 2004. Fourth impression of HC1999. Green book spine cover. Front cover is plain grey with a red and gold gilt image of the dragon at the lower edge and a runic symbol in the center. 14.3 ×22.2 cm. ISBN 978-0-00-711835-9.	
35	HM2007	Houghton Mifflin Company of Boston & New York, 2007. Published by HarperCollins Publishers, 2007. This is the 70th Anniversary hardcover edition. The text of this edition is based on that published by HarperCollins Publishers in 1995. Dust jacket is an enlargement of the original 1937 dust jacket. However, on the front cover there is a red sun over the mountains, and there is a drawing of Smaug in red in the sky with a crescent moon on the back cover. Black paper over boards. Inside front cover (endpaper 1) is Thror's Map in black and red ink. Inside rear cover (endpaper 2) is the Map of Wilderland in blue ink. Preface is excerpted from the forward to The Hobbit 50th Anniversary Edition by Christopher Tolkien published in 1987. Notes on the text by Douglas A. Anderson from 2001. Chapter 1 of The Fellowship of the Ring, "A Long-Expected Party", appears as an appendix. ISBN 0-618-96863-6. 1st printing Sept. 2007. Bottom right corner of front cover flap has "0907". 276 numbered pages.	
36	HC2008	HarperCollins Publishers UK, 2008. Paperback edition with illustrations by Alan Lee. The front cover shows an image of Smaug resting on his hoard. Thror's Map and the Map of Wilderland are the same as HM2007. 13.0 × 19.7 cm. ISBN 978-0-00-727061-3.	
37	HC2012/1	HarperCollins Publishers UK, 7 June 2012. Paperback featuring a drawn cover image similar to one of the film teaser posters for Peter Jackson's 2012 film The Hobbit: An Unexpected Journey, showing Bilbo from behind as he steps out of the door of his Hobbit hole. Front cover contains a line: "International children's bestseller". The maps of Wilderland and Mirkwood are included in the appendix. 13 × 19.7 cm. ISBN 978-0-00-745842-4.	
38	HC2012/2	HarperCollins Publishers UK, 30 August 2012. Paperback film tie-in edition with the actual cover image from the film teaser poster depicting Martin Freeman as Bilbo. Front cover headline reads: "Now a major motion picture". Preface by Douglas A. Anderson and illustrations by David Wyatt from HC1998. Chapter 1 of The Fellowship of the Ring, "A Long-Expected Party", appears as an appendix. 13 × 19.7 cm. ISBN 978-0-00-748728-8. Published by Houghton Mifflin Harcourt, 2012, ISBN 978-0-547-84497-8.	1. Random House Publishing Group mass market edition (2012) has a film poster cover image that is slightly tilted to the right. ISBN 978-0-345-53483-5.
	HM2012	Houghton Mifflin Harcourt/Mariner Books, 18 September 2012. Paperback 75th anniversary edition with a front cover referencing the original 1937 cover layout, but with golden mountains and birds, and red sun on a black and dark blue background. Chapter 1 of The Fellowship of the Ring, "A Long-Expected Party," appears as an appendix. 13.8 × 21 cm. ISBN 978-0-547-92822-7.	
39	HC2012/3	HarperCollins Publishers UK, 8 November 2012. Hardback special collector’s film tie-in edition. Includes new reproductions of all illustrations and maps by Tolkien. Grey front cover shows a graphic with brownish trees against a silhouette of mountains and a golden sky. 15.3 × 22.1 cm. ISBN 978-0-00-748730-1.	

== Early American editions ==
First American edition

The early United States editions of The Hobbit were published by the Houghton Mifflin Company of Boston and New York City and are particularly collectible but difficult to identify. Tolkien's publisher was George Allen & Unwin of London (A&U). Houghton Mifflin of Boston and New York arranged to publish Tolkien's books in the United States. Houghton Mifflin printed sheets for the first edition from plates etched from a photo-enlargement of the Allen & Unwin first edition. For the second edition they imported sheets directly from A&U. However, they bound their own volumes, usually distinctly from their British counterparts. The American versions differed from the British in one respect crucial to the collectibles market: beyond the first printing, most of Houghton Mifflin's impressions did not identify which printing run they came out of or even a copyright date. This failure caused confusion in the collectibles market, as few people can identify the Houghton Mifflin second editions, which were extant from 1951 to 1966.

Very roughly, earlier printings are valued more than later. In particular, the first edition, with its different account of Riddles in the Dark, is in great demand. However, the fifth overall impression, or the first printing of the second edition, seems to be garnering prices as high as the British fourth printing, which was the cheapest and most common of the first edition printings. Later second edition printings are valued much less than first edition printings or the first printing of the second edition. The presence of the matching dust-jacket often doubles the value of any of these printings, particularly if it is in good shape. However, because the second American edition changes its binding color from printing to printing, they gain considerable charm displayed in array without their jackets.

=== The first edition ===
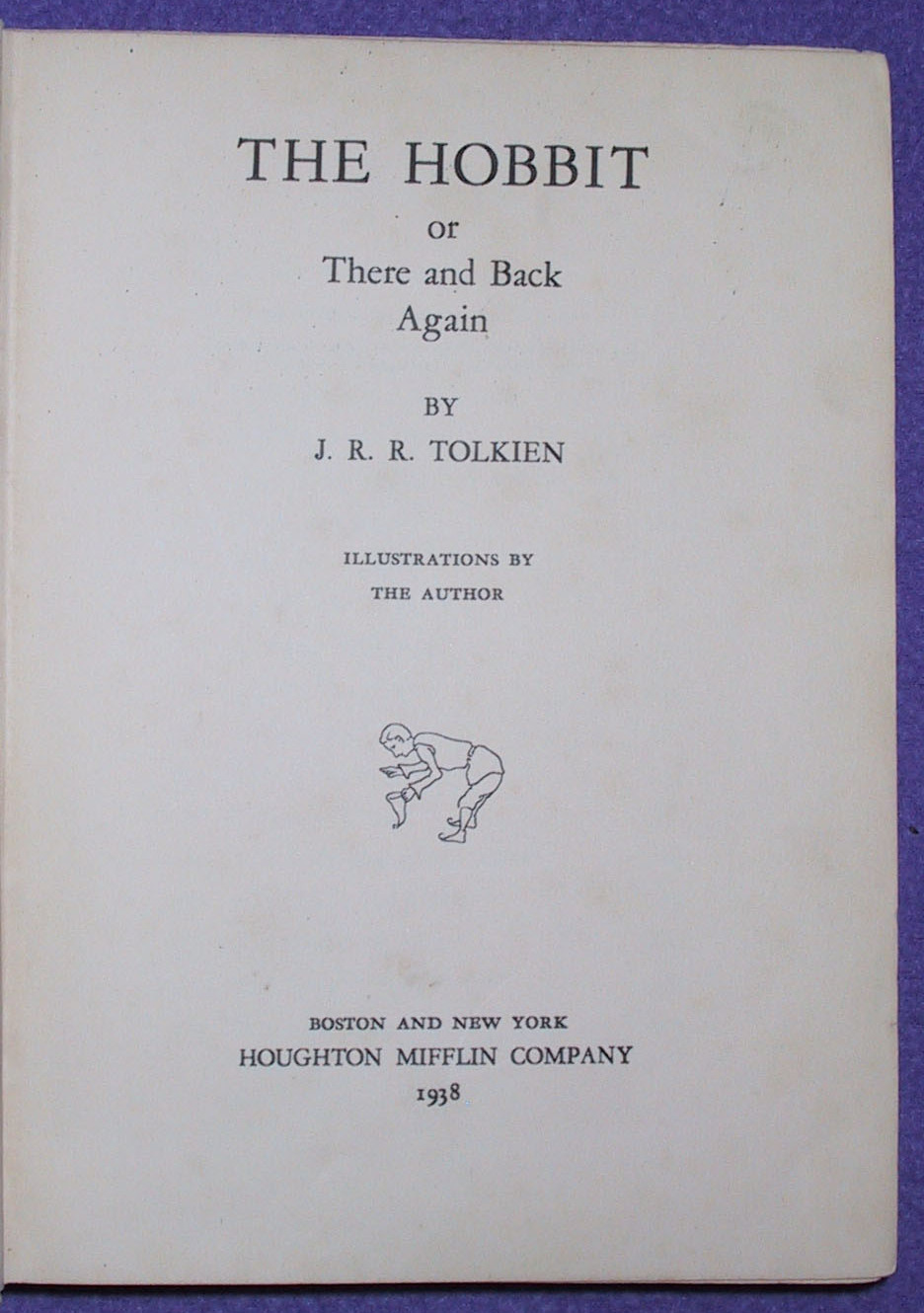
1st edition, 1st printing

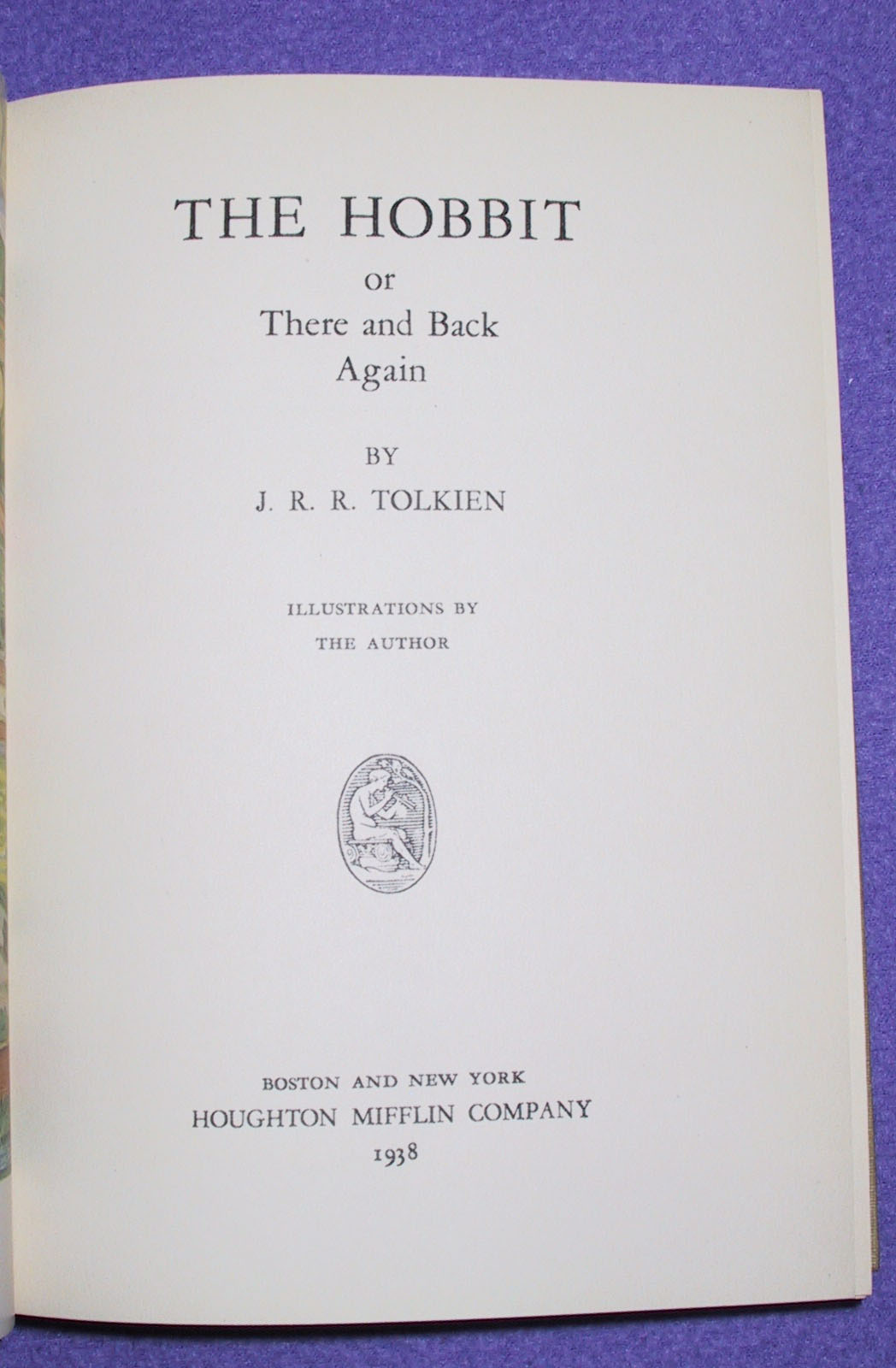
1st edition, later printings

Houghton Mifflin published the first American edition of The Hobbit in spring of 1938 following its September, 1937 debut in the United Kingdom. For this first edition Houghton Mifflin printed the sheets in the United States. They chose to print it in a larger size and on heavier stock than Allen & Unwin's first edition, and they included four color plates of Tolkien's original artwork. Margins are ample and the typesetting well crafted for readability. The lettering on the tan cloth cover is printed in deep blue. The bowing hobbit emblem on the front and the dwarf's hood emblem on the spine are filled with bright red. The end-paper maps were printed in red only, instead of the black and red chosen by Allen & Unwin. The publisher mistakenly put the Wilderland map at the front and the Lonely Mountain map at the back, the reverse of the description in the text.

Surviving dust-jackets on the first edition are rare. It is not known whether that is because of attrition, because some printings were not jacketed, or because lots directed to some markets did not come with jackets. What is known is that jackets have been reported on more than one of the printings, most commonly on the first printing. The jacket has a medium blue field all around. The front announces the title in white, beneath which appears, in color and framed in red, Tolkien's illustration of Hobbiton. The reverse displays Tolkien's illustration of Smaug on his trove, also in color.

A series of changes to the book suggest that Houghton Mifflin printed the first edition several times. The earliest copies show the same bowing hobbit emblem on the title page as is visible on the cover, but in outline. The first printing appeared on March 1, 1938. This earliest printing also has no half-title page. At some point the publisher replaced the emblem on the title page with a seated flautist. The first two printings mistakenly identify Chapter VII as Chapter VI on page 118, a defect corrected in the third. The binding's cloth changes slightly in color and texture in step with other changes. The first printing's table of illustrations lists Thrór's map as the front endpaper, in accordance with the text (page 30) but contradicting the actual order. The later printings of the first edition list the Wilderland map as the front endpaper, in accordance with the actual order but contradicting the text.

(Regarding the bowing Hobbit emblem, some say the boots the hobbit wears conflicted with the text's description of a bare-footed hobbit, prompting the publisher to replace it. Yet the device comes directly from Tolkien's picture of Bilbo bowing to Smaug on his horde of treasure. Tolkien defended the boots to an astute reader by explaining that Bilbo had acquired them along the way.)

Hammond & Anderson refer to these variations as "states" within the "first printing", and recorded only two: one with the bowing hobbit on the title page, and one with the seated flautist. Houghton Mifflin's practice was to place the publication year at the foot of the title page for the first printings of its first editions. All first edition Hobbit copies, of all variations, with or without the bowing hobbit of the first printing, show "1938" as the date on the title page, perhaps discouraging bibliographers from ascribing different printings to them.

Other library bindings have been reported. A red library binding with yellow title and a simple geometric design in black, and including free-leaf maps, has been seen with the stamp "New Method Book Bindery", a company well known in the trade at the time (later becoming "Bound to Stay Bound Books Inc".)

All printings of the first edition measure 15.0 x 21.0 cm. They contain 310 numbered pages.

==== First edition identifier ====
Printing characteristics matrix
printing	emblem	half-title	binding	page 118	map order†	map stock	map leaves	type flaws	date††
1	hobbit	none	book cloth A	Chapter VI	Thrór front	smooth	paste-down	clean	03/1938
2	flautist	present	book cloth A	Chapter VI	Thrór back	smooth	paste-down	clean	11/1938
3	flautist	present	book cloth B	Chapter VII	Thrór back	smooth	paste-down	clean	11/1938
4a	flautist	present	book cloth C	Chapter VII	Thrór back	rough	paste-down	broken A, broken B, or broken B/C	09/1944
4b	flautist	present	book cloth D	Chapter VII	Thrór back	rough	paste-down	broken B; Some have broken B/C	12/1942
4c	flautist	present	book cloth E	Chapter VII	Thrór back	rough	paste-down	broken C	

†Note the explanation below: this is not the order the maps appear, but, rather, the order stated in the List of Illustrations. In all first editions the Wilderland map appears as the front paste-down.
††Earliest confirmed date as seen in publisher's records, owner's inscriptions, or library stamps.

- emblem
  - hobbit: Center of title page shows a bowing hobbit emblem.
  - flautist: Center of title page shows a seated flautist emblem.
- half-title
  - none: Volume has no half-title page.
  - present: Volume has a half-title page.
- binding
  - book cloth A: Yellowish-tan with slight greenish cast. Even color, tight weave in both directions.
  - book cloth B: Neutral light tan, the lightest amongst the group. Tight weave.
  - book cloth C: Slightly darker than book cloth B; very faint pinkish cast in some light. Even weave.
  - book cloth D: Variegated darker tan, lacking any greenish or yellowish pall. Linen-like weave.
  - book cloth E: Similar to book cloth A, but more intensely yellow.
  - library: Deep orange with jacket design silk-screened in black.
- page 118
  - Chapter VI: The chapter title is mislabeled.
  - Chapter VII: The chapter title is correct.
- map order
  - Thrór front: The List of Illustrations mistakenly states Thrór's map is the front endpaper.
  - Thrór back: The List of Illustrations correctly states Thrór's map is the rear endpaper.
- map stock
  - smooth: The paper the maps are printed on is smoothly calendered.
  - rough: The paper the maps are printed on is no smoother than the text block.
- map leaves
  - paste-down: The outside leaf of each map is pasted down onto the inside of the cover.
  - free: The outside leaf of each map is a free leaf.
- type flaws
  - clean
    - None of the flaws listed below.
  - broken A
    - p. 193: Line 8, the "t" in "into" is broken.
    - p. 193: Line 10, the "o" of "of" is broken.
    - p. 205: Line 5, the "e" of "else" is broken.
    - p. 237: Last paragraph, there may be spots of thin ink toward the left, especially the two (s)s of "darkness" as well as "the" below.
  - broken B
    - All of broken A plus:
    - p. 81: Line 16, the comma after "blade," is light, and so is the opt left of the "o" just below.
    - p. 119: Line 3, the "o" in "below" is broken at the bottom.
    - p. 125: Line 4, the "o" in "to see" is broken at the bottom.
    - p. 125: Line 13, the "ea" in "mean" is slightly clipped at the top.
    - p. 145: Line 16, the "he" in the first "the" is lightened.
  - broken B/C
    - All of broken B plus:
    - p. 213: Line 13, the right stem of "n" in "nor" is broken in the middle.
    - p. 217: Line 1, the hump of the "h" in "the" has a hairline crack.
  - broken C
    - All of broken B/C plus:
    - p. 17: Line 2, the upper half of the left stem of the "w" in "well" is lightened slightly.

=== The second edition ===
==== Basics ====
Tolkien began work on The Lord of the Rings in the years after The Hobbit's publication. As the story evolved, Tolkien realized he needed to change how Bilbo and Gollum interacted in The Hobbit to suit the plot of The Lord of the Rings. He also wrote a new version of the introductory note to explain an apparent discrepancy between the map, saying that Thrain had been king under the mountain despite Thorin's father Thrain never having held that title. This was explained as the map referring to a distant ancestor, Thrain I. However, this introduced contradictions with the text, such as statements that Erebor had been founded in the time of Thorin's grandfather, thus precluding an ancient Thrain I having ruled there. These issues were eventually addressed with changes for the third edition. Allen & Unwin prepared a new edition of The Hobbit for release in 1951, and Houghton Mifflin followed suit. These American impressions from the 5th through the 14th were bound from sheets printed in Great Britain, corresponding to the same George Allen & Unwin printings of the second edition. Unlike the AU printings, the American copies do not state the printing until the 18th in the second edition, making them very difficult to identify in isolation. The only exceptions are the 11th, 12th, and one of the two variants of the 5th impression, each of which states the full printing history. The following list of "points" was developed by Strebe by comparing unknown American printings to known British printings. Steve Frisby untangled the 9th printing, which differs from its Allen & Unwin counterpart on page 315. (This divergence likely resulted from the cancel title pages AU was obliged to supply when they converted 9th printing sheets intended for British domestic use into Houghton Mifflin sets.) Information regarding the print run sizes of the Second American Edition of The Hobbit is held by the University of Reading Special Collections Service.

The American second editions from the 5th through 14th printings measure 12.7 x 19.0 cm, contain 315 numbered pages, and have end-paper maps printed in black, white, and red. The frontispiece is printed in color, but the remaining color plates of the first edition have been eliminated. With the exception of the 5th printing, the cover design is similar to the American first edition, only smaller, differently colored, and lacking the bowing hobbit emblem on the front board. Both variants of the 5th printing, on the other hand, are bound identically to the British printings, with the only distinction being the notation "Houghton Mifflin Company" at the base of the book's spine.

==== Print runs ====
The following table lists the printing dates, export dates, and number of sheets exported from George Allen & Unwin to Houghton Mifflin across the second edition, as determined from George Allen & Unwin records. The Stated date is the date listed in the corresponding UK impression's printing history on the copyright page.

Impression	Printed	Stated	Exported	Copies
5a	1950	1951	January, 1951	1,000
5b	1950	1951	March, 1953	700
6	1954	1954	August, 1954	1,000
7	1955	1955	June, 1955	1,000
8	1956	1956	March, 1956	1,000
9	1957	1957	June, 1957	1,000
10	1958	1958	March, 1958	2,500
11	1959	1959	May, 1959	2,500
12	1960	1961	December, 1960	2,500
13	1961	1961	November, 1961	2,500
14	1963	1963	March, 1963	4,000

==== 5th printing variants ====
Houghton Mifflin issued two distinct variants corresponding to the British 5th printing.

The earlier variant (5a) is constructed in a similar style to the subsequent American printings of the second edition. That is, the title page states "Houghton Mifflin Company - Boston, The Riverside Press - Cambridge", and the book lacks the printing history and colophon entirely. Even so, the sheets for the text body came from A&U and thus are identical to the British 5th printing.

The later variant (5b) is identical to the British 5th printing in every regard except for the "Houghton Mifflin" notation at the base of the spine. In particular, the title page states "London, George Allen & Unwin Ltd, Museum Street"; the colophon shows the A&U St. George and the Dragon insignia and the addresses of the publishers offices worldwide; and the title page verso shows the full printing history.

==== Dust-jackets ====
American second edition dust-jackets are nearly identical to British, except that Houghton Mifflin is printed at the bottom of the spine instead of George Allen Unwin. The design is basically unchanged from the original 1937 edition of The Hobbit. Dust-jackets declare the impression and often may be used to ascertain at least the approximate printing of the book. Sometimes, however, the publisher put dust-jackets from one printing onto books of a neighboring printing. Also lost, damaged or discarded dust-jackets are sometimes replaced with ones acquired elsewhere. Hence the jacket cannot be considered definitive.

==== Collation ====
The 5th and 6th impression signature marks are at the bottom center:
[B] on page 17, henceforth incrementing one letter every 16 pages.
[*] on page 307.

The 7th, 8th, and 9th impression signature marks start with [B] on page 17, henceforth incrementing one letter every 32 pages.
[*] on page 307.

Signature marks change on the 10th impression: [A*] at the bottom of the Table of Contents; [B] at bottom left of page 33 etc. These signature marks remain unchanged through the 14th impression.

==== Paper ====
Paper weight, measured as thickness, varies from printing to printing. Generally the earlier impressions are thinner than the later. Measurements exclude the binding and end papers; they start from the half-title page and extend to the last story page. The leaves should be pressed tightly when measuring. Measurements are rounded to the nearest half millimeter.

Impression	Paper weight
5th impression	18.0 mm
6th impression	20.0 mm
7th impression	19.0 mm
8th impression	17.0 mm
9th impression	16.0 mm
10th impression	19.0 mm
11th impression	20.0 mm
12th impression	22.5 mm
13th impression	24.0 mm
14th impression	23.0 mm

==== Binding ====
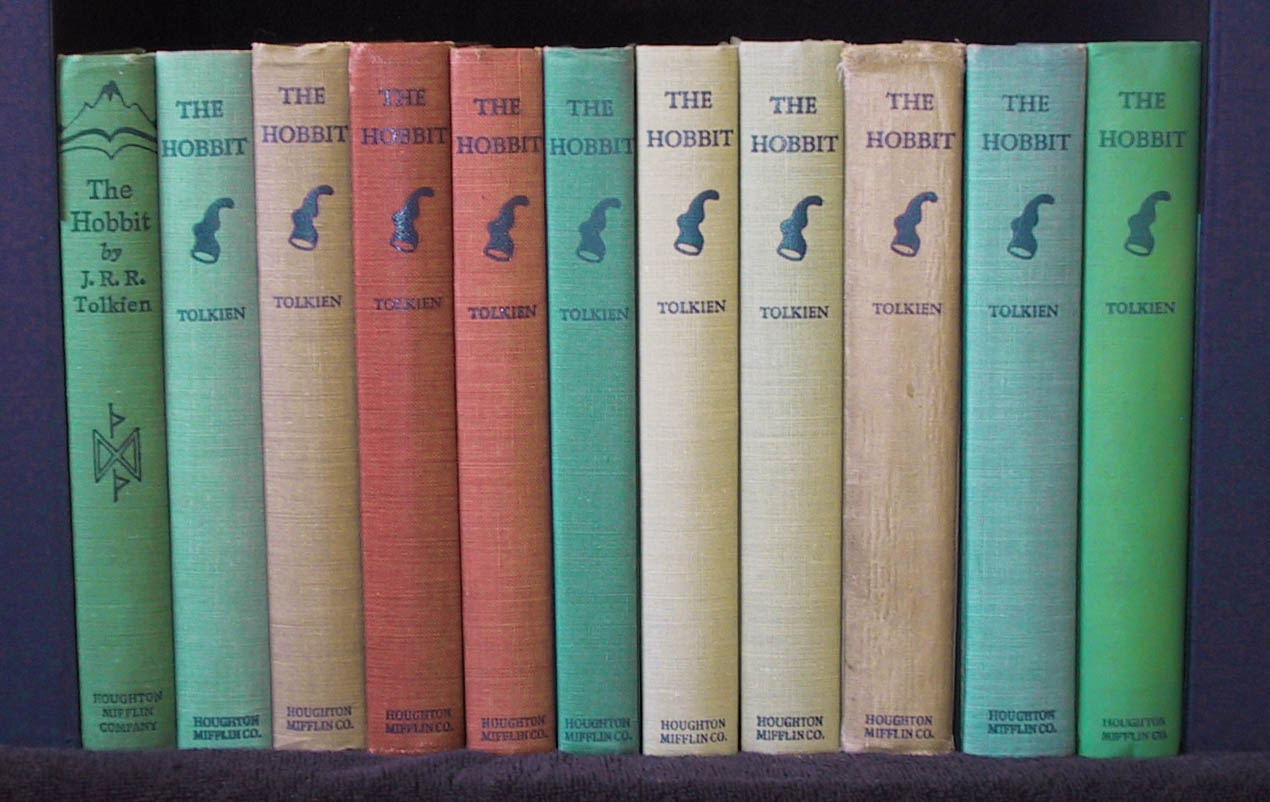
Second edition printings 5th-14th, with two 7ths of different color

The 5th through 14th impressions come in a variety of colors. Generally all the books from one printing are bound in the same color, but exceptions may have been found, perhaps when bindings intended for one printing were left over and found use at the beginning of the next printing. Hence the color of the covers cannot conclusively identify a book.

Impression	Binding
5th impression	Bound identically to the British impressions. Green with mountains and dragon bordering.
6th impression	Light blue-green. The 6th impression is the first of the American-style covers.
7th impression	Some in khaki; some in rust brown with a slight orange cast.
8th impression	Rust brown with a slight orange cast.
9th impression	Teal.
10th impression	Very light green.
11th impression	Very light green.
12th impression	Very light green.
13th impression	Slate blue with a greenish tint.
14th impression	Saturated grass green.

==== Advertisements ====
Commencing with the 7th impression, the final page of the story advertises The Lord of the Rings. The distance between the advertisement and the main body of the text varies from impression to impression. Here the distance is measured from the baseline of the last line of the story's text down to the baseline of the first line of the advertisement.

Impression	Distance
7th impression	52.0 mm down.
8th impression	53.0 mm down.
9th impression	53.0 mm down (this differs from the A&U 9th impression's 38 mm).
10th impression	51.5 mm down.
11th impression	38.0 mm down.
12th impression	38.0 mm down.
13th impression	38.0 mm down.
14th impression	42.0 mm down.
15th impression	15.0 mm down.

- The 5th impression advertises Farmer Giles of Ham on the reverse of the half-title page.
- The 6th impression advertises The Lord of the Rings on the reverse of the half-title page but not on the last page of the text.
- The 6th through 13th impressions advertise Farmer Giles of Ham and Lord of the Rings* on the reverse of the half-title page.
- The 14th impression advertises The Adventures of Tom Bombadil, Farmer Giles of Ham, and Lord of the Rings on the reverse of the half-title page.
- The 15th impression of the Allen & Unwin British edition advertises The Adventures of Tom Bombadil, Farmer Giles of Ham, (The) Lord of the Rings, and Tree and Leaf on the reverse of the half-title page. Houghton Mifflin probably did not issue a printing from these sheets.

* The advertisement for The Lord of the Rings on the half-title page is missing 'The' until the 24th printing.

==== Printing flaws ====
Starting with the 7th impression, the first "o" on page 22 is broken at 5:00 o'clock.

The 13th impression, on the bottom of page 315, displays an illegible "ab" in "you will learn a lot more 'about them". The 7th through 12th impressions, on the other hand, are clean. The illegible "ab" persists throughout remaining printings of the second edition, both British and American.

==== Later printings of second edition ====
Houghton Mifflin enlarged the book to 14.0 x 21.0 cm commencing with the 15th printing, probably in 1964. At that point they abandoned importing sheets from George Allen and Unwin. Parallel to the single British 15th printing, Houghton Mifflin reprinted The Hobbit nine times from their own plates until the advent of the third edition. They dropped the red color from the maps and removed the color frontispiece so that no color remained in the book's interior. The 15th and remaining printings of the second edition are bound in light green with lettering in dark blue. Beginning with the 18th impression the volumes state the printing number on the reverse of the title page. The 23rd impression is the final impression of the second edition.

The 24th printing belongs to the third edition: it replaces the second edition's description of the revised edition with a description of runes; the type is completely reset; and the page count increases to 317.

While the Allen and Unwin sheets appear to have been printed from Linotype plates, clues suggest that Houghton Mifflin opted to filmset the later printings of the second edition. They did not phototypeset new plates; rather they seem to have photographed the 14th impression. While the sheets are larger, the type block itself is identical. All the print surface flaws that the Allen and Unwin plates had accumulated up to that point were faithfully reproduced in film for the remaining printings. Because any number of copies of the film can be made and stored for future use, the type does not degrade from printing to printing the way it would with Linotype. If the film tears or loses its crispness, it may simply be replaced with a duplicate. Indeed, the 23rd impression's type block is effectively identical.

By settling on a single binding color and dropping all color from the interior, Houghton Mifflin cheapened later printings of the second edition, making them less 'collectible'.

=== The third edition ===
In 1965, finding a grey area in copyright law and irregularities in Houghton Mifflin's copyright and import compliance, publisher Ace Books issued a paperback edition of The Lord of the Rings against Tolkien's wishes. Already aware of potential copyright weakness and now having learned of Ace's plans, that same year George Allen & Unwin asked Tolkien to prepare a list of revisions to both The Hobbit and The Lord of the Rings, so that their copyrights could be renewed. Several dozen short changes were then introduced in the next few impressions of The Hobbit, starting with the 24th printing in 1966 and being complete by 1968. These were primarily minor stylistic variations (e.g. "They hadn't been riding..." to "They had not been riding...") and revisions to bring the story more in line with Tolkien's latest ideas about the broader mythology of his Middle-earth stories. Collectively, these changes are considered the third edition. The printings of the standard third edition are not marked as such. Instead, they list their printing on the reverse of the title page in the original succession, dating right back to the first UK printing. They are bound identically to the later printings of the second edition. The first impression of the third edition is the one marked as the 24th printing with a copyright date of 1966. Second editions contain the original description of the revised edition, beginning with, "In this reprint several minor inaccuracies...". The third edition's foreword, on the other hand, describes the runic characters seen on the maps and in the text. It commences with, "This is a story of long ago." Also, third editions contain 317 numbered pages, as compared to the 315 of the second edition.

== Other known English-language editions ==
- BCA Publishing edition of 1992. Quarterbound with gilded lettering on spine and raised ribbing.
- Alan Lee illustrations, 60th anniversary edition, 1997
- HarperCollins Alan Lee illustrations, 2000, published for Dealerfield Ltd. Pictorial laminated boards. Almost certainly just a variant of 1997 Alan Lee.
- Michael Hague illustrations, hardcover
- Unwin 4th edition
- Del Rey paperback with cover matched to Peter Jackson's films
- 1999 HarperCollins DeLuxe edition
- "Collins Modern Classics", Title on front shifted left of center
- Thorndike Press Large Print Basic Series, 483 pages.
- Unwin early 80s mass-market paperback with Smaug on his hoard, "The Hobbit" over a rust-colored background rectangle
- Harper Collins Limited Editions Collectors' Box with CD, fold-out map, etc. 2000.
- Unwin Hyman 1987 50th anniversary
- Black softcover with red dragon at bottom on front and runes in circle in middle
- Ballantine 1987 paperback 50th anniversary edition (with or without 50th anniversary note); Bilbo and Gollum on cover, cover illustration by Michael Herring.
- Ballantine 1978 film art edition, softcover edition of HA1977 Rankin/Bass animation.
- Late 1990s Ballantine softcover with "natural" scene of Gandalf in foreground, bridge in background, river flowing to foreground, forest on the right.
- 3D pop-up edition illustrated by John Howe
- Houghton Mifflin hardcover 4th edition, 255 pages, with Tolkien illustrations, but dust jacket shows Smaug on his hoard and vases, cups, and chalices in the foreground.
- 1970 The Hobbit "Pleasure in Reading" edition. 279 pages. Australian edition? Complete?
- Ballantine paperback edition with "The Greatest Epic Fantasy of Our Time" on green background; Gandalf approaching Bag End; 305 pages.
- 1972 English edition printed in Taiwan.
- Newer version of EB1990 with new cover art
- Harper Collins, 80th anniversary facsimile of 1937 first printing
- Harper Collins, 90th anniversary edition, with illustrations by Tove Jansson from the 1962 Swedish edition.

== See also ==
- Translations of The Hobbit
