= Carrick (surname) =

Carrick is a surname. Notable people with the surname include:

- Alexander Carrick (1882–1966), Scottish sculptor
- Bill Carrick (1873–1932), American baseball player
- Connor Carrick (born 1994), American ice hockey player
- Dale Carrick (born 1994), Scottish footballer
- David Carrick (born 1975), Police officer and serial rapist
- David Carrick (1946–1989), English footballer
- Donald Carrick (1906–1997), Canadian lawyer, political figure, Olympic boxer, and national golf champion
- Edward Carrick (1905–1998), British art designer, film director and author
- Ethel Carrick (1872–1952), English-born Post-Impressionist painter
- James Stewart Carrick (1855–1923), Scottish rugby union and cricket player
- John Carrick (disambiguation), various
- Mervyn Carrick (born 1946), Northern Ireland politician
- Michael Carrick (born 1981), English footballer
- Phil Carrick (1952–2000), English cricketer
- Sir Roger Carrick (born 1937), British former diplomat and author
- Sam Carrick (born 1992), Canadian ice hockey player
- Samuel Carrick (1760–1809), American Presbyterian minister
- Thomas Heathfield Carrick (1802–1874), English portrait miniature painter
- William Carrick (1827–1878), Scottish-Russian artist and photographer
- Willie Carrick (1952–2023), Irish former footballer
