= Southern Pacific (disambiguation) =

The Southern Pacific Railroad was an American railroad.

Southern Pacific may also refer to:

- Southern Pacific (band), an American country rock band
  - Southern Pacific (album), 1985
- Southern Pacific (narrow gauge), a network of narrow gauge railroad lines operated by the Southern Pacific Railroad
- Southern Pacific Ocean
- The Southern Pacific Railroad, originally the Texas Western Railroad, completed from Marshall, Texas, to the Louisiana border in 1861, and absorbed by the Texas and Pacific Railway in 1872; unaffiliated with the California-based company of the same name

== See also ==
- South Pacific (disambiguation)
