= John Mole =

John Mole may refer to:

- John Mole (musician) (1949–2006), English bass guitar player
- John Mole (poet) (born 1941), British poet
- John Henry Mole (1814–86), English painter

== See also ==
- John L. Moll (1921–2011), American electrical engineer
