= The Enchanted World =

Book series by Time-Life Books

- Edited by: Ellen Phillips, Tristram Potter Coffin, et al.
- Translator: various
- Illustrator: various
- Cover artist: various
- Country: Alexandria, Virginia, US; Amsterdam, Netherlands; London, UK; Augsburg, Germany; Moscow, Russia
- Language: en-us, en-uk, de, fr, nl, ru
- Genre: Fairy Tales, Folklore, Mythology
- Publisher: Time-Life Books. Inc.: Time-Life Books B.V.; Caxton Publishing Group; Weltbild Verlag; Terra
- Published: 1984–2005
- Published in English: 1984–1987
- Media type: print
- No. of books: 21 (or less for some foreign editions)
- OCLC: 11854843

The Enchanted World was a series of twenty-one books published in the time period 1984–1987. Each book focused on different aspects of mythology, fairy tales or folklore, and all were released by Time-Life Books. Their overall editor was Ellen Phillips and their primary consultant was Tristram Potter Coffin, a Guggenheim Fellowship Award-winning University of Pennsylvania Professor Emeritus of English.

== Premise ==
A unique part of the series was that its books were written as stories, taking place from an "in-universe" perspective, presenting its subjects as real people, places, and things. Related to such things having once been real, a common thread through several of them was its documentation of the alleged decline of magical things from "when the world was young" to the modern day. The subjects - dragons, dwarfs, giants - are presented as being potent and strong at the dawn of time, but magical creatures grow weaker and eventually disappear as humans spread and demystify the world, though there is always the promise that the magic will return once again.

The books' subject matter often overlap; for example, while King Arthur and his knights only have one book completely devoted to them, Fall of Camelot, they often appear in other books. Half of Legends of Valor is about them, and they appear in Wizards and Witches, Fairies and Elves, Dwarfs, Spells and Bindings and Giants and Ogres. Nonetheless, a series characteristic was that attention was also given to folklore tales, legends and fairy tales originating from other parts of the world (the until then fairly unknown ones from Eastern Europe in particular) besides the ones from Western Europe alone such as the Arthurian legends or the Brothers Grimm fairy tales, even though they remained over-represented in the series.

Christendom is often related to the decline. Though The Enchanted World describes it as humankind's greatest shield against those magics and beings of magic that would prove hostile to it, it proved detrimental even to good magic as people ceased to believe in the old gods in favor of Christ. According to the series, this was because Christianity was centered around a god of reason and that it promised a clearly defined universe of order and stability, a universe where there could be only one god. Magic could hardly thrive under such circumstances. It continued to exist either in opposition to Christianity or, more often, in connection to in-between places and in-between things. The series states that magic had always had a strong connection to things that were neither one thing nor another because as neither one thing nor another, such things could escape definition and be more than what they appeared.

== Release overview ==
The volumes in the series were known for their art and the extensive research used by their respective authors' retold stories, and were executed as gold imprinted, cloth bound hardcover books, with a glued-on cover illustration. A richly illustrated series, its wealth of illustrations consisted of a mix of especially commissioned ones done by an international array of contemporary book illustrators of repute, as well as already existing ones lifted from older works from the hand of past masters, especially those from the Victorian and Edwardian ages of romanticism, which had seen a strong revival of interest in folklore, the Arthurian legends in particular. At first, the books were not furnished with dust jackets. They were however provided for the retail copies, after the regular retail bookstore channel became employed by the publisher for their book publications as well from 1991 onward, alongside their hitherto traditional Direct-to-Customer (DTC)-only distribution method.

As had been customary with the Time-Life Books series print publications, each of the original US first-edition series volumes had received two ISBNs (the second one usually eight numbers higher), with the lower number indicating the retail (with dust jacket)/DTC copies whereas the higher ones indicate the library binding ("lib. bdg.") copies as specified in the book colophons. The popularity of the Enchanted World series, resulting in multiple reprint runs for most of the individual titles, led to the subsequent followup publication of the 1987-91 Mysteries of the Unknown series.

=== International editions ===
French, German, and Dutch-language editions were near-concurrently released by the local "Time-Life Books B.V." Amsterdam branch. Truncated, the Dutch-language edition (as Het Rijk der Fabelen, which literally translates as "The Realm of Fables"), did not see the last eight volumes in translation – most likely because of disappointing sales. The same branch was also responsible for the UK English-language editions, of which the latter were also intended for all territories outside the US/Canada and indistinguishable from the US source publications, save for their ISBNs and the use of the British versus the American spelling. Unlike their Dutch counterpart, the French and German-language series editions were completed in their entirety as Les mondes enchantés and Verzauberte Welten ("Enchanted Worlds" – plural in both cases) respectively. Contrary to the French and Dutch editions, which only saw one print run each, the series was a popular one in the German-speaking territories, enjoying multiple reprints.

In 1996, Moscow-based publisher Terra released a licensed Russian-language edition, entitled Зачарованный мир ("Zacharovannyĭ mir"), a literal translation of the series title. This edition was published in its entirety, contrary to both the Dutch-language edition and the German second-edition release, which ran for only eight volumes.

The UK too saw a partial second-edition release in 2003-2005, licensed to the London-based Caxton Publishing Group under a full license from the European "Time-Life Books B.V." Amsterdam branch, which remained in business a few years longer after the American "Time-Life Books, Inc." mother division had gone defunct in 2001 as a dedicated book publisher. As with the German second-edition release, this British second-edition was only a partial reprint of the series, with only six titles.

=== Volume titles of The Enchanted World ===
In order of publication; the UK and German-language editions have their first-edition ISBN listed first, followed by the second-edition ISBN where applicable:

==== "Wizards and Witches" (1984, ISBN 0809452049, 0809452057) ====
Brendan Lehane's book opens stating that in the earliest days the world was not yet fully ordered and the process of creation not yet completed. Since reality was fluid, it was relatively easy for mighty wizards such as Finland's Väinämöinen, Taliesin, Manannán mac Lir, Math the Ancient and Gwydion to cast their magic. Magic in those days was almost instinctual and inborn; it was an art. Those days ended with Merlin, the last of the old wizards, famous for his mentorship of King Arthur and the realm of Camelot. When he withdrew from the world, magic itself began to withdraw, and the wizards retreated from human sight.

As Christianity came to define the world, the use of magic became much more difficult and even dangerous. It was now no longer an art to be understood instinctively, but a science that required years of study, and perhaps presumed too much: to reshape the order of reality was to challenge God (the author of that reality), and, more often than not, a wizard found himself taking the aid of the devil himself. Some wizards earned their powers legitimately and used them responsibly; Roger Bacon is one example, as revealed in one tale. Others, such as Michael Scot, gambled their souls by attending the Scholomance, the school of black magic. Still others, such as Faustus, took the quick and easy way and made deals with the Devil, always with grisly results.

Concurrent with the scholar wizards were their more humble cousins, the witches. Unlike their male counterparts, their magic retained links to the natural world. Some witches were good and were called white witches, cunning folk, and fairy doctors. They tended to be good Christians and they used their powers for good; their spells were often indistinguishable from prayers. The White Paternoster is just one example. They were needed to counterbalance and oppose their evil sisters who used their powers for the sake of greed, revenge, or even just cruel pleasure. They more often than not placed themselves in the service of the devil and served as his perfect followers. The Witches' Sabbath was their chief pleasure.

Lehane closes that as time marched on and witches retreated from humankind, their magic was forgotten and relegated to stories for scaring children. Even so, their ancestors, the sleeping wizards, are still alive and waiting for the time to awaken.

The book contains 143 pages and is divided into the following three chapters, which each contain sub-chapters and side bar stories.

- Cover: (illustrated by James C. Christensen)
- Contents: (illustrated by Arthur Rackham)
- Chapter One: Singers at the World's Dawn (illustrated by Akseli Gallen-Kallela, Mel Odom, James C. Christensen, Lorraine D. Rivard, John Jude Palencar, Master of Edward IV, N. C. Wyeth, and Eleanor Fortescue-Brickdale) (pg.6)
  - Timaren's bride quest (illustrated by Akseli Gallen-Kallela) (pg.9)
  - Life songs in the lands of the dead (illustrated by Akseli Gallen-Kallela) (pg.11)
  - The island enchantress (illustrated by John William Waterhouse) (pg.13)
  - Wizard of Kiev (illustrated by Ivan Bilibin) (pg.21)
  - A realm in the balance (illustrated by Louis Rhead) (pg.35)
  - A blade for Britain's King (illustrated by N. C. Wyeth) (pg.36)
  - The Welsh Enchanter's Fosterling (illustrated by Kinuko Y. Craft) (pg.40)
- Chapter Two: Masters of Forbidden Arts (illustrated by James C. Christensen, Carlo Dellarocca, Kinuko Y. Craft, and Harry Clarke) (pg.56)
  - The Provençal prophet (illustrated by Charles Nicolas Canivet) (pg.64)
  - Taletelling Cards (illustrated by Judy King-Rieniets and Bonifacio Bembo) (pg.67)
  - Diviners of the far North (illustrated by Alicia Austin) (pg.71)
  - The Black School (illustrated by John Jude Palencar) (pg.73)
  - Legions of the Night (illustrated by Louis Le Breton) (pg.75)
  - Tidings of the Heavens (illustrated by Judy King-Rieniets, Hans Holbein the Younger, Venturino Mercati, Cristoforo de Predis, Paul Limbourg, and Mark Hess) (pg.88)
- Chapter Three: The Shadowy Sisterhood (pg.96)
  - Workaday witchery (pg.99)
  - A soft-footed servant (pg.100)
  - Golden maid in a stony cage (pg.103)
  - A silent spy (pg.106)
  - A raucous-voiced herald (pg.107)
  - Snaring an earthbound demon (pg.108)
  - The Witch's Garden (pg.110)
  - The secret of flight (pg.112)
  - A pair of sinuous helpers (pg.115)
  - Belled and beribboned dancers (pg.119)
  - A cache of charms (pg.120)
  - Haunter of the Birch Forest (pg.122)
- Index: (illustrated by Arthur Rackham)

UK edition: "Wizards and Witches" (1984, 2003, ISBN 0705408809, 1844471829)
Dutch edition: "Heksen en tovenaars" (1984, ISBN 9061828511)
German edition: "Zauberer und Hexen" (1984, ISBN 9061828511)
French edition: "Sorcières et magiciens" (1984, ISBN 2734402831)
Russian edition: "Kolduny i vedʹmy" (1996, ISBN 530000538X)

==== "Dragons" (1984, ISBN 0809452081, 080945209X) ====
Dragons opens recounting the legends of Apep, Tiamat, Jörmungandr, Nidhoggr, and Typhon. Born before time began, these creatures were sons of chaos, and so the gods did battle with them, for only when they were beaten could order prevail and the universe be born. Across various cultures, the same story was told with Set and Ra, Marduk, Thor, and Zeus playing the same role. The gods ultimately did prevail and these cosmic dragons were destroyed but the fight was not yet over because they left descendants with whom mortals would do battle. Cadmus's dragon was one example.

Chinese dragons and other Asian dragons were an exception to all this; unlike their western cousins, they never lost their semi-divine status and, again unlike them, they were mostly benevolent. The creator goddess Nu Kua was herself partly dragon, and the Emperor of China sat on the Dragon Throne. The Dragon Kings governed wind and water and for the rain they sent the Chinese people loved them.

No such love was present for European dragons. While not always evil as seen with the Laidly Worm, dragons were nearly always a threat, and even when they were not, they guarded treasures that man sought, whether gold or water or something else. They had to be destroyed and Christianity, "the hammer of the dragon race", proved one of the most powerful weapons against them because it promised a world in which dragons, creatures of appetite, could have no place. Some saints killed their dragons, such as Saint Margaret, while other saints, such as Carannog, tamed theirs. Regardless of the good intentions of men like Carannog, however, peaceful coexistence between man and dragon was almost impossible as the tale of Saint Martha and Tarasque shows. The dragonslayers rose up to destroy them as well. Saint George is the most famous example. A dragonslayer could expect to win gold, women, and everlasting glory, but it was usually a quest for survival. In the end, humans civilized the world and drove dragons to extinction.

The book contains 143 pages and is divided into the following four chapters, which each contain sub-chapters and side bar stories.

- Contents: (illustrated by Wayne Anderson)
- Chapter One: Chaos Incarnate (pg.6)
  - A perilous feasting place (pg.10)
  - Destroyer at the roots of the world (pg.13)
  - A pallet worthy of a god (pg.21)
  - Sleepless guardian of the golden apples (pg.22)
  - An enchantress' shifting of the odds (pg.25)
  - A Field Guide to Dragons (illustrated by Wayne Anderson) (pg.30)
- Chapter Two: Glittering Gods of the East (pg.40)
  - Queller of the great deluge (pg.43)
  - Reclaiming an Emperor's gift (pg.59)
  - A Maid Who Braved the Deep (pg.62)
- Chapter Three: The Serpent Ascendant (pg.70)
  - Winged torch of Europe's towns (pg.74)
  - Where Dragons Dwelled - MAP (pg.78)
  - Of Maidens and Dragons (pg.83)
  - Bejeweled haunters of the Alps (pg.93)
  - The serpent and the Cross (pg.95)
  - Sojourn in a Watery Realm (pg.98)
- Chapter Four: Rise of the Dragonslayer (pg.106)
  - The desperate combat of Lancelot (pg.112)
  - The Terror of Kiev (pg.115)
  - Death to a dragon from on high (pg.120)
  - A prophet's daring ploy (pg.124)
  - Ancient Tales of Persian Kings (pg.132)
- Index: (illustrated by Wayne Anderson)

UK edition: "Dragons" (1985, ISBN 0705408825)
Dutch edition: "Draken" (1984, ISBN 906182852X)
German edition: "Drachen" (1985, 1995, ISBN 906182852X, 389604009X)
French edition: "Dragons et serpents" (1985, ISBN 2734402955)
Russian edition: "Drakony" (1996, ISBN 5300006203)

==== "Fairies and Elves" (1984, ISBN 080945212X, 0809452138) ====
Unlike other books in the series, this text does not concentrate on the decline of magic, though it does state that in the beginning, beings of pure magic (not exactly gods but more than mortal) freely intermingled with mortals (the friendship of Arawn and Pwyll is one example) only to separate themselves later on. They were known to the Norse as the Alfar or elves in English and sometimes as fairies, a word that derives from the Latin fatum/fate and fatare/enchant. Fairie correctly refers to their lands or magic. In contrast to mortals, beings who sought order, these magical beings were said to be very fickle and unpredictable. Even members of the usually good Seelie Court were prone to mischief.

The chief classifications were the trooping and solitary fairies the aristocrats and peasants of their kind. Among the Trooping fairies are mentioned the Sidhe, the Tuatha Dé Danann and the children of the Dagda. Though friendly enough to their mortal counterparts, they eventually withdrew from their sight and were replaced in mortal interactions by their smaller cousins. Leshy, polevik, and other nature spirits continued to haunt the wilds of the world. They were all very unpredictable; some were friendly to humans and used their powers to help them with their household chores while others were cruel and delighted in tormenting mortals.

Inevitably, the fairies weakened in the wake of humanity. This was in changelings; a fairy mother would exchange her child with a human child, perhaps to add the vigor of humanity to a weakening race. Also, the friendly meetings which had characterized their relationship with mortals grew increasingly rare. Husbands of swan maidens often won their wives only through deceit. True love was possible between fairies and mortals but, as in the case of Melusine, the love failed when the mortal husband broke the wife's trust.

The book contains 143 pages and is divided into the following four chapters, which each contain sub-chapters.

- Cover: (illustrated by John Atkinson Grimshaw)
- Contents: (illustrated by Jözef Sumichrast)
- Chapter One: Lands behind Enchantment's Veil (illustrated by Winslow Pinney Pels) (pg.6)
  - A World in Miniature (pg.36)
- Chapter Two: Guardians of Field and Forest (pg.46)
  - The Myrtle Tree's Sweet Tenant (pg.68)
- Chapter Three: Of Fairy Raids and Mortal Missteps (pg.76)
  - Tam Lin (pg.100)
- Chapter Four: The Heart's Far-Carrying Call (pg.108)
  - Trials of a Charmed Passion (pg.132)
- Index: (illustrated by Jözef Sumichrast)

UK edition: "Fairies and Elves" (1986, 2005, ISBN 0705408817, 1844471845)
Dutch edition: "Feeën en elfen" (1984, ISBN 9061828538)
German edition: "Feen und Elfen" (1984, ISBN 9061828538)
French edition: "Les Elfes et les fées" (1984, ISBN 2734402890)
Russian edition "Fei i ėlʹfy" (1996, ISBN 5300005258)

==== "Ghosts" (1984, ISBN 0809452162, 0809452170) ====
This book about ghosts opens starting with one of the many ghost stories contained throughout the book. A short excerpt is: "Late one spring night in the last century, a certain Englishman found himself, to his astonishment, standing in the garden outside his house. It was quite bewildering. He remembered falling asleep in his bed, but he had no memory of waking and walking out the door. Yet here he was, shivering in the chill, his bare feet buried in rain-soaked grass. Another surprise awaited him: when he tried the door, it proved to be locked".

The book contains 143 pages and is divided into the following four chapters, which each contain sub-chapters.

- Chapter One: Guises of the Reaper (pg.6)
  - Song of the Sorrowing Harp (pg.32)
- Chapter Two: Invasions by the Angry Dead (pg.38)
  - A Meeting on the Road Home (pg.62)
- Chapter Three: Shadow Plays of Grief and Pain (pg.70)
  - The Hooded Congregation (illustrated by Chris Van Allsburg) (pg.100)
- Chapter Four: Hands Across the Void (pg.108)
  - Glam's Tale (pg.132)

UK edition: "Ghosts" (1985, ISBN 0705408833)
Dutch edition: "Spoken" (1985, ISBN 9061828546)
German edition: "Gespenster" (1985, ISBN 9061828546)
French edition: "Fantômes et revenants" (1985, ISBN 2734403072)
Russian edition: "Privideniia" (1996, ISBN 5300008273)

==== "Legends of Valor" (1984, ISBN 0809452200, 0809452219) ====
Written by Brendan Lehane, Legends of Valor centers primarily on Cúchulainn and the world of the Ulster Cycle, and later on King Arthur and the Matter of Britain. Other heroes briefly mentioned are Perseus, Sigurd, and Roland from Greek myth, Volsunga saga, and the Matter of France/Song of Roland, respectively.

In detailing the life of Cuchulain, Lehane writes that in the early world, tribes needed champions to protect them and lead them in battle. The king could not risk his life, so in his place a hero fought and were the jewels in a king's crown. It emphasizes that heroes were often born to gods and mortal Queens—it was not given to peasants to sire or spawn heroes. Such men were warriors and were expected to be fierce and savage. Their lives were short, bound to vows of vengeance and the "cruel demands of honor". The life of Irish hero Cuchulain is retold, and with it, how while there were other men of the Red Branch, he proved himself the greatest champion of Conchobar mac Nessa, King of Ulster. Cuchulain, the son of Lugh fought bravely for his king and became a warrior without peer, although he was killed by Maeve who tricked him into breaking his various vows or geis. After Cuculain's death, Ireland was plunged into chaos, though later, as the Fenian cycle told, order was restored. Leading men milder and more civilized, but just as valiant, High King Cormac Mac Art and his Fianna protected Ireland from invasion. Even there conflicting vows could spell doom as when Grianne betrayed her husband the king by sleeping with his champion Diarmuid.

The rest of the story centers on the "Brotherhood of the Round Table". Heroes still lived but they were different from their forebears, most notably in the moralizing effects of chivalry. A knight was expected to be kind to women, to show mercy to defeated foes, and to refuse no plea for help. Horses also gave men greater mobility. Under the salvific influence of Christianity, Arthur and his men were the finest heroes in all Christendom and beyond. Despite the Christian kingdom of Camelot being at peace, such men were needed as giants, dragons, and witches made Britain a place of wonder and danger. Some magical beings, such as the Lady of the Lake, proved friends. However, those who would harm the innocent were kept at bay due to Arthur's Knights, chief among them Lancelot, the Lady's son. Lancelot's love for Guinevere, Arthur's Queen, would bring down Camelot which was already grievously exhausted by the Grail Quest. In searching for the Holy Grail, the Knights of the Round Table did prove themselves the very best heroes of all times but the loss of so many good men in the quest crippled Camelot and left it vulnerable to decay from within. Arthur's bastard son Mordred, in the end, destroyed the perfect world his father tried to create, though it is promised that one day, Arthur will return.

The book contains 143 pages and is divided into the following four chapters, which each contain sub-chapters.

- Contents: (illustrated by Alicia Austin)
- Chapter One: Lords of the Chariot and the Spear (illustrated by Anne Yvonne Gilbert, Leo and Diane Dillon) (pg.6)
  - A Champion's Schooling in Another World (pg.34)
- Chapter Two: The Cruel Demands of Honor (illustrated by John Jude Palencar) (pg.42)
  - Treachery of the Nibelungs (pg.64)
- Chapter Three: Brotherhood of the Round Table (pg.74)
  - Warriors in a World of Wonders (pg.100)
- Chapter Four: The Noblest Quest of All (pg.108)
  - The Great King's Final Battle (illustrated by John Mulcaster Carrick) (pg.132)
- Index: (illustrated by Alicia Austin)

UK edition: "Legends of Valour" (1985, ISBN 0705408841)
Dutch edition: "Heldensagen" (1985, ISBN 9061828554)
German edition: "Heldensagen" (1985, 1995, ISBN 9061828554, 3896040081); the only second-edition title to carry the original cover illustration
French edition: "Légendes chevaleresques" (1985, ISBN 2734403102)
Russian edition: "Legendy doblesti" (1996, ISBN 5300007927)

==== "Night Creatures" (1985, ISBN 0809452332, 0809452340) ====
This book opens with one of many stories in the book about creatures of the night. The first story is an old Danish tale. Following is an excerpt: "Within this hall, hearths and torches blazed warm and bright, and drinking horns passed freely among the warriors of the Scylding clan; bards intoned the praises of their chieftain, Hrothgar, the valorous King; harpists sang of warmth and light. Outside the hall, however, solitary in the cold and dark, another kind of being walked. Although manlike, that being was no man. Huge and hairy, it shambled through the night mists of fell and fen, its claws scrabbling from time to time in the dirt as it tore at its hapless prey - hares, ferrets and other small beasts".

The book contains 141 pages and is divided into the following four chapters, which each contain sub-chapters.

- Cover: (illustrated by Matt Mahurin)
- Chapter One: Perilous Paths through the Dark (pg.6)
  - A Reckoning with the Fianna's Ancient Bane (pg.30)
- Chapter Two: Visitations from the Realm of Shadow (illustrated by John Jude Palencar) (pg.38)
  - Charting the Kingdom of Dreams (illustrated by Willi Glasauer) (pg.62)
- Chapter Three: Blood Feasts of the Damned (illustrated by Anne Yvonne Gilbert) (pg.72)
  - Nighstalker of Croglin Grange (pg.98)
- Chapter Four: The Way of the Werebeast (pg.108)
  - The Fox Maiden (pg.132)

UK edition: "Night Creatures" (1985, ISBN 0705408876)
Dutch edition: "Wezens van de duisternis" (1985, ISBN 9061828589)
German edition: "Nachtgeschöpfe" (1985, ISBN 9061828589)
French edition: "Les Créatures de la nuit" (1985, ISBN 2734403366)
Russian edition: "Prizraki nochi" (1996, ISBN 5300006017)

==== "Water Spirits" (1985, ISBN 0809452456, 0809452464) ====
Water Spirits opens with the story of man who saved the life of a mermaid who promptly blessed him with the power to heal and to break witchcraft and cursed him so that every generation one man from his family would drown. This was done to illustrate people's fear of the sea as a mysterious and fickle place that could from one moment give life and in the other death. Water was hailed as the source of life; the Hindus worshipped the Ganges under the name of Ganga, Mimir's well gave Odin his wisdom, the Nile and the Jordan River built civilizations, and everywhere people sought the Fountain of Youth. Water Spirits then points out that the creation myths of many cultures imagine the universe coming out of the watery deep and that many cultures recalled a time when the world was washed clean of sinners by the Great Flood.

Humans began taking the initiative in sea quests, however, as seen with Jason and his Argonauts. He was faithful to the gods and led a crew of heroes across the Mediterranean, Aegean, and Black Seas. Regardless of his initial faithfulness to the gods, those same gods destroyed Jason but turned the Argo into a constellation. That was a testimony to how fickle the gods could be, because sea gods were viewed in relation to their seas. Poseidon, for example, was as arbitrary as the enchanted seas and magic islands he ruled. On the contrary, the kinder Ea came from the calmer Persian Gulf to teach men civilization and agriculture whilst the consistently cruel Rán ruled the volatile North Sea. The gods would lose their strength, however.

In Christian times, sailors no longer worshipped the sea gods but still lived in fear of the sea's power. For example, ships were still launched on Woden's Day/Wednesday and not, for example, on Thor's Day for fear of storms and thunder. Figureheads replaced the oculi, or eyes, of Greek Triremes, but the function remained the same; keep a lookout for evil. Anointing a ship with wine replaced the pagan custom on smearing ships with animal and even human blood. There were limits, as seen with how Christian priests were rarely let on board for fear of angering the old gods.

Lakes and rivers held their powers too in the form of Nixes and Undines. The Japanese told of Urashima and Europeans of selkies and mermaids; daughters of foam-born Aphrodite, they were carved on churches as warning against lust.

The book contains 143 pages and is divided into the following four chapters, which each contain sub-chapters.

- Contents: (illustrated by Alicia Austin)
- Chapter One: Wellspring of the Universe (pg.6)
  - Scourges from the North (pg.28)
- Chapter Two: Daring the Sea-gods' Realm (pg.36)
  - Predators from the Primal World (pg.60)
- Chapter Three: Wraiths of Wind and Wave (illustrated by Troy Howell, Karel Šedivý) (pg.68)
  - Rendezvous with a Death Ship (pg.92)
- Chapter Four: Perilous Borderlands (pg.100)
  - A Doomed Alliance of Earth and Water (pg.126)
- Index: (illustrated by Alicia Austin)

UK edition: "Water Spirits" (1985, ISBN 0705408906)
Dutch edition: "Watergeesten" (1985, ISBN 9061828619)
German edition: "Wassergeister" (1986, 1995, ISBN 9061828619, 3896040057)
French edition: "Les Génies des eaux" (1986, ISBN 2734403498)
Russian edition: "Dukhi vod" (1996, ISBN 5300007099)

==== "Magical Beasts" (1985, ISBN 0809452294, 0809452308) ====
Magical Beasts opens with a recounting of how early in humanity's existence the world was locked in an Ice Age. Humans feared the animals and worshipped the cave bear. Time passed and the cave bear perished, but other beast gods remained such as Cernunnos. The gods of Egypt were beast men and the Greeks spoke of their gods disguising themselves as animals. There are other examples such as Chiron; a centaur, he was hailed as the divine beast. There came the day, however, that Pan, the goat god, died and the beast gods's decline began. This was seen in how animalistic Fomorians of Ireland had lost their magic and were forced to ruling with brute force. They and Balor, their king, were routed by his grandson Lugh of the Long Hand, champion of the ascendant Tuatha de Danaan. Magic was dying as Europe was Christianized, but there were other places in the world such as Asia where magic yet held sway and dog men, monopods, and Blemmyes.

It also recounts that many flying animals, both mundane and magical, commanded respect for reason that they were able to escape the mundane world by flight. Pegasus, the roc, simurghs, firebirds, the phoenix, and even ordinary birds like the raven in mythology and the robin were revered. Other flying animals were also known such as griffins, harpies and tengus.

Of all magical beasts, however, the unicorn was the most respected. It epitomised beauty and purity but courage as well because it would never let itself be taken alive. Its cousins included China's ki-lin and the Persian karkadann which, unlike their European counterpart, respectively embodied only gentility or ferocity. All, however, could be tamed by maidens. Unicorn horns also had the power to cure poison and disease; in their desire to obtain the horns, humans drove unicorns to extinction.

The text mentions other beasts such as the manticore, mermecolion, barometz, basilisk, and peryton.

The book contains 143 pages and is divided into the following three chapters, which each contain sub-chapters.

- Chapter One: Vestiges of the Elder Days (pg.6)
  - The Tale of the Monkey-God (pg.44)
- Chapter Two: Riders of the Wind (pg.56)
  - An Enchanted Bestiary (pg.88)
- Chapter Three: Paragon of Purity (pg.100)
  - A Peerless Mount for World-Conquering Alexander (pg.130)

UK edition: "Magical Beasts" (1985, ISBN 0705408868)
Dutch edition: "Fabeldieren" (1985, ISBN 9061828570)
German edition: "Fabeltiere" (1985, 1995, ISBN 9061828570, 3896040073)
French edition: "Bestiaire magique" (1985, ISBN 2734403285)
Russian edition: "Volshebnye zhivotnye" (1996, ISBN 5300006629)

==== "Dwarfs" (1985, ISBN 0809452243, 0809452251) ====
Dwarfs (actual spelling used in book - this is the traditional spelling - "dwarves" comes from The Hobbit author J.R.R. Tolkien and was an intentional change of spelling) opens with the Younger ("Prose") Edda, a narration of Norse mythology. It opens with Norse dwarves and tells how the race began soon after Odin and his Aesir killed Ymir, using his flesh to make the earth. The maggots that crawled from the flesh became dwarfs. Corpse grey and subterranean troglodytes, the gods tended to look down on them but the dwarfs, brash and brazen, knew that when Aesir needed weapons or wanted luxuries that the dwarfs by their magical craftsmanship alone could provide what was needed. While author Tim Appenzeller admits that such tales contain much fiction, they still contain a grain of truth.

In time the dwarfs lost the ability, or the will, to stand as equals to the gods and walked among mortals. With the pagan gods dead and the God and His Church dominant, a new world had dawned. Even so, the dwarf kings such as Herla or Laurin of the Tyrol's Mountains were not afraid and outshone their cavedwelling ancestors in splendor. The dwarfs adapted well to Christian Europe, befriending mortals; Alberich, for example, was famous for befriending King Otnit of Lombardy and going with him to Syria to help him win an exotic pagan princess for a bride. The tale of Elidor is also recounted.

The dwarfs' decline is further explored with the dwarfish peasantry. They were friendly towards mortal peasants with whom they shared parallel lives and they often helped each other just as their respective kings did. As humans grew stronger, forming centralized states, large cities, roads, and factories, and as the dwarfs' own magic began to fail them, the fragile ties of friendship began to unravel and most dwarfs left the mortal world. Those that remained, abandoned by their fellows suffered a diaspora and placed themselves at mortals' mercy. They went on to become household spirits slavishly serving as domestic help of their particular mortals, though even there they would go into retreat. The last sightings of dwarfs concerned the Knockers, beings that lived in mines and watched over miners. While, the text says, miners would give them food and drink; these were offerings, not rewards. Tim Appenzeller goes on to speculate that knockers are just the most visible members of hidden dwarf kingdoms. While some of them might be recent dwarf refugees from the outside world, some of them might have always lived there, "awaiting the day when their earth-shaping skills will once again dazzle mortals and gods alike".

The book contains 141 pages and is divided into the following four chapters, which each contain sub-chapters.

- Cover: (illustrated by Arthur Rackham)
- Contents: (illustrated by James C. Christensen)
- Chapter One: Stern Sons of the Earth (pg.6)
  - A Blade Charged with Vengeance (pg.32)
- Chapter Two: The Diminutive Nobility (pg.40)
  - King Herla's Costly Promise (pg.64)
- Chapter Three: An Ancient Race in Retreat (pg.72)
  - A Sampling of Dwarf Types (illustrated by Wayne Anderson) (pg.98)
- Chapter Four: Haunters of Hearth and Hayloft (illustrated by John Howe) (pg.106)
  - The Night Workers (illustrated by Alicia Austin) (pg.130)
- Index: (illustrated by James C. Christensen)

UK edition: "Dwarfs" (1985, ISBN 070540885X)
Dutch edition: "Dwergen" (1985, ISBN 9061828562)
German edition: "Zwerge" (1985, ISBN 9061828562)
French edition: "Gnomes et nains" (1986, ISBN 2734403277)
Russian edition: "Gnomy" (1996, ISBN 5300006025)

==== "Spells and Bindings" (1985, ISBN 0809452413, 0809452421) ====
On magical spells.

- Chapter One: Double-Edged Power (pg.6)
  - Ancient Metamorphoses (pg.34)
- Chapter Two: Webs of Enchantment (illustrated by Donna Neary) (pg.50)
  - An Embowered Sleep (illustrated by Roberto Innocenti) (pg.74)
- Chapter Three: Deliverance from Magic's Coils (illustrated by Anne Yvonne Gilbert, Alicia Austin, Julek Heller) (pg.88)
  - A Spell-Shackled Devotion (illustrated by John Howe) (pg.124)

UK edition: "Spells and Bindings" (1985, 2004, ISBN 0705408892, 184447187X); the UK 1st edition version differs from the US one by featuring a purple cloth cover instead of a brown one. The second printing of the first edition however, followed the pattern as set by the original US edition.
Dutch edition: "Toverspreuken" (1986, ISBN 9061828600)
German edition:"Zauberbann und Zaubersprüche" (1986, ISBN 9061828600)
French edition: "Charmes et maléfices" (1986, ISBN 2734403455)
Russian edition: "Chary i puty" (1996, ISBN 5300006637)

==== "Giants and Ogres" (1985, ISBN 0809452375, 0809452383) ====
Giants and Ogres opens by stating that at the dawn of time, the giants were the mightiest of beings, creatures whom even the gods feared. It cites the legends of Og, Orion, Cronus, and Ymir, and shows that in those earliest of days, giants were indeed wielders of incredible size and strength. However, these "princes of the cosmos" were also superior to the gods (their children) in authority, wisdom, and magic. In fact, it was from the giants that the Greek and Norse gods had to wrest their dominion. Even after, as was seen in the Northlands where the giants held to their power the longest, the gods looked to the giants as equals, beings to whom they would turn in search of wisdom.

As the "first world" ended and they lost their equality with the gods, giants assimilated into mortal society. Some, such as Bran the Blessed, went on to become kings and heroes, worthy heirs of their ancestors. Others befriended and watched over the peasantry; some giantesses even used their magic as midwives for their tiny neighbors. However, as the giants' decline accelerated, they grew increasingly hostile to humans. They became enemies of humanity, using their superior strength and their magic to attack the younger race that was taking over their world. Their cousins, the trolls and the ogres, became outright predators raping human women and eating human men. Examples such as the giant who had no heart in his body or of the giant who faced Jack atop the beanstalk (illustrated by Barry Moser) are cited.

By the end of their existence, when men like King Arthur and Charlemagne ruled, the giants were totally defeated. While there remained a few wise and noble giants such as Ferragus, who battled Roland, they were the exceptions. Most had shrunk in size to the point that they were only slightly larger than humans. Worse, the giants - beings whose wisdom even the gods had once envied - became degenerate cretins, who could be bested by mere children's tricks. Though the giants disappeared, the common folk never forgot them, they remembered the great monuments they had built, such as Giant's Causeway, and the Long Man of Wilmington, as illustrated by Willi Glasauer.

- Cover: (illustrated by Roberto Innocenti)
- Contents: (illustrated by Alicia Austin)
- Chapter One: Princes of the Cosmmos (pg.6)
  - The Heirs of the First World (illustrated by Matt Mahurin) (pg.30)
- Chapter Two: Protectors and Providers (illustrated by Roberto Innocenti, John Howe) (pg.42)
  - The Tests of the Green Knight (illustrated by Alicia Austin) (pg.68)
- Chapter Three: A Deepening Enmity (illustrated by Barry Moser) (pg.78)
  - Kilhwch and Olwen (pg.102)
- Chapter Four: The Twilight of Power (pg.110)
  - The Earth's Memory (illustrated by Willi Glasauer) (pg.130)
- Index: (illustrated by Alicia Austin)

UK edition: "Giants and Ogres" (1985, ISBN 0705408884)
Dutch edition: "Reuzen en Wildemannen" (1986, ISBN 9061828597)
German edition: "Riesen und Ungeheuer" (1986, 1995, ISBN 9061828597, 3896040030)
French edition: "Ogres et géants" (1986, ISBN 2734403412)
Russian edition: "Velikany i lyudoyedy" (1996, ISBN 5422409353)

==== "Seekers and Saviors" (1986, ISBN 0809452499, 0809452502) ====
Tales and beliefs about the adventures of explorers, heroes, and damsels.

- Chapter One: Under the Wing of Magic (illustrated by Michael Hague) (pg.6)
  - An Undying Guardianship (pg.32)
- Chapter Two: Tests of Love and Loyalty (pg.48)
  - A Slave Maiden's Eye for Evil (pg.78)
- Chapter Three: Strong Arms, Sturdy Hearts (pg.96)
  - The Quest of the Fair Unknown (pg.122)

UK edition: "Seekers and Saviours" (1986, ISBN 0705408914)
Dutch edition: "Sprookjesfiguren" (1986, ISBN 9061828627)
German edition: "Rächer und Retter" (1986, ISBN 9061828627)
French edition: "Les Héros et les humbles" (1986, ISBN 2734403536)
Russian edition: "V poiskakh spaseniia" (1996, ISBN 5300007846)

==== "Fabled Lands" (1986, ISBN 0809452537, 0809452545) ====
About mythological places:

- Contents: (illustrated by Michael Hague)
- Chapter One: Journeys into Wonder (pg.6)
  - An Enchanted Archipelago (pg.32)
- Chapter Two: Realms of Eternal Night (pg.48)
  - Daring the Dark (illustrated by Willi Glasauer) (pg.76)
- Chapter Three: A Parting of Worlds (pg.90)
  - The Countess of the Fountain (pg.120)
- Index: (illustrated by Michael Hague)

UK edition: "Fabled Lands" (1986, ISBN 0705408922)
Dutch edition: "Legendarische Koninkrijken" (1986, ISBN 9061828643); final title to see a Dutch translation
German edition: "Verwunschene Reiche" (1986, 1995, ISBN 9061828643, 3896040103)
French edition: "Royaumes fabuleux" (1986, ISBN 2734403579)
Russian edition: "Volshebnye strany" (1996, ISBN 5300019380)

==== "Book of Christmas" (1986, ISBN 0809452618, 0809452626) ====
Brendan Lehane's Book of Christmas opens with a brief retelling of the Nativity story told in the Gospels of Luke and Mark. It recounts Mary and Joseph going to Bethlehem and the birth of Jesus Christ but states that the pattern was already set. The fact that the birth of Jesus, the Sun of Righteousness, is celebrated in December is no accident. There are many winter festivals. Most people worshipped the sun as a god and so were afraid when winter came and it seemed that the lifegiving sun grew weak; thus they celebrated the Solstice, the winter day when the weakening sun regained its strength. In fact, many Christmas traditions have their roots in pre-Christian traditions but it was the birth of Jesus that made a season of fear into a season of hope.

Such fears are mentioned in tales of animal and even human sacrifice meant to appease the pagan gods such as Odin in hopes of surviving winter. Christmas was also said to be the time of the dead; as it was the time when the whole world seemed to die and was an undefined in between time, it was only right the ghosts and monsters rise up against mortals. Similarly, the Wild Hunt and its various leaders are recounted, various heathen deities such as Berchta and Gwyn ap Nudd being cast out by their former worshippers in favor of the Christian God whose mortal birth those worshippers celebrated.

However, while winter could be terrifying, Lehane asserts that most Christians were not afraid. They celebrated a topsy-turvy Christmastide with mummers and plays and feasts led by the Abbot of Misrule. Christmas was a time filled with old magic when animals could talk and nature spirits abounded, but followers of the new religion saw nothing strange in keeping their ancestors' pagan traditions alive. Their faith was not the abolition, but rather the fulfillment, of their old rituals because with Jesus, the rituals meant to hold back winter's darkness were vindicated. Lehane states: "In the Child born at Bethlehem, they had the promise of spring in the heart of midwinter, the divine gift of a bright, cleansing flame to drive away the dark".

- Chapter One: The Eternal Moment (pg.6)
  - Days of Winter Magic (pg.18)
- Chapter Two: The Heart of Darkness (pg.38)
  - The Midnight Battle (pg.62)
- Chapter Three: Summoning the Sun (pg.78)
  - The Songs of Christmas (pg.104)
- Chapter Four: The Light Triumphant (pg.128)

UK edition: "Book of Christmas" (1986, 2004, ISBN 0705408949, 1844471802)
German edition: "Das Weihnachtsbuch" (1986, ISBN 9061828651)
French edition: "Le livre de Noël" (1987, ISBN 2734403757)
Russian edition: "Kniga rozjdestva" (1996, ISBN 5300006254)

==== "Fall of Camelot" (1986, ISBN 080945257X, 0809452588) ====
The book is 143 pages long. It is divided into seven chapters. Each chapter deals with a different person in the life of King Arthur.

1. Arthur (pg.8)

Arthur's father, Uther Pendragon sees Igraine, the beautiful wife of Gorlois, the Duke of Cornwall. He desires her and asks for help from the Wizard, Prophet and Enchanter Merlin. Merlin promises to do this in exchange for any child that may be conceived from the union. Merlin enchants Uther to look like Gorlois and Uther has his way with Igraine. Nine months later, Arthur is born and taken away by Merlin. He is raised in secret in Wales until the age of fifteen. During a tournament in London, Arthur, acting as a squire, while searching for a sword for the knight he serves, finds the Sword in the Stone in a church courtyard and pulls it out, thereby proving to the world that he is the rightful heir to the throne of England. Even with this heavenly mandate, Arthur still is forced to defeat many other armies in battle in order to win the throne.

2. Morgause (pg.20)

Igraine and Lord Gorlois had had three daughters before Lord Gorlois died. These daughters knew that Arthur was their half-brother. Arthur, though, was unaware. The eldest of the three daughters, Morgause, travelled to Camelot, where Arthur fell in love with her. Merlin prophesied that if Arthur slept with Morgause that the child that would come of it would destroy England and kill Arthur. Arthur ignored this counsel and took Morgause anyway. She then became pregnant and left before Arthur was aware of it. The child that he fathered that evening was Mordred.

3. Guinevere (pg.36)

Guinevere was the daughter of Lord Leodegrain. Arthur fell in love with her and married her. During the wedding feast, Guinevere asked Merlin to perform some magic for her and the guests as entertainment. At first he declined, but then later created an illusion that entertained, but also upset many. After the spell was complete, Merlin told all that his act of casting magic had alerted the Old Ones who were now looking at and paying attention to King Arthur and his court. Having the attention of the Old Ones is something that is not preferred. It can bring a lot of pain.

4. Morgan (pg.56)

All of Gorlois and Igraine's three daughters hated Arthur, but Morgan, the youngest, hated him the most. But she hid her hate well. Arthur knew neither that she was his sister nor that she hated him. She and her husband came to live with Arthur in Camelot, where her husband worked as one of Arthur's knights. Morgan, though, was very beautiful, and many of the knights chose to be close to her. One day, Arthur was kidnapped by a knight who was having an affair with Morgan. Before the fight, Morgan had stolen Arthur's sword Caliburn and had given it to her lover. She then also gave Arthur a cursed copy of his own sword. During the fight, the cursed sword slowed Arthur down and took away enough of his strength that he was about to lose the fight. But the Lady of the Lake arrived, magically pulled the sword from the hand of his enemy, and returned it to Arthur. Arthur, who won the fight, also became aware of Morgan's hate for him. Nevertheless, Morgan tried to kill Arthur several other times, unsuccessfully.

5. Lancelot (pg.74)

At birth, Lancelot's name was Galahad, but after his father was killed and his father's castle destroyed, he was taken and raised by the Lady of the Lake. This was where he received the name Lancelot. He is also sometimes referred to as the "Fair Foundling" and "Lancelot du Lac". He was the greatest of all knights. No one was his equal.

He was presented to Arthur when he was eighteen by the faeries. Arthur took him in and trained him to be a knight. Lancelot and Guinevere though fell in love at first sight and they had a secret affair that lasted for years. Morgan, Arthur's half-sister, found out about this affair and informed the King about it.

Lancelot had a son with another woman and gave him the name Galahad, which had been his own birth name.

6. Mordred (pg.90)

Mordred was unaware for a long time that his father was Arthur. He came with his mother Morgause and lived in Camelot, where he eventually became one of Arthur's knights. During one travel, Mordred and Lancelot met an old man who prophesied to Mordred that he would kill his own father, Arthur, destroy the knights of the round table, and kill the old man as well, but that his father, Arthur, would also kill him. This is how Mordred found out that Arthur was his father. Mordred grew so angry that he drew his sword and killed the old man instantly. Lancelot felt like killing Mordred for his cruelty, but chose not to.

Mordred eventually found out about the affair between Lancelot and Guinevere, and thus, he followed Lancelot and Guinevere and found a place where they were sleeping. In consequence, Mordred brought many knights there to act as witnesses of the affair. Lancelot fought his way out and left Camelot, but Guinevere was taken and arrested. Arthur was law-bound to punish his wife and the law demanded that she be burned at the stake.

The next day, many knights had left Camelot, as everyone had loved Guinevere, and her execution sentence seemed so unjust that the round table was broken. Many knights abandoned their brotherhood. The two knights who were ordered to tie her to the stake and burn her refused to wear their armor to do it. They did not agree with the sentence either, and refused to obey it as knights. But as the fires were lit, a band of rebel knights, led by Lancelot, burst into Camelot, killed the men who had been ordered to execute Guinevere, and took Guinevere away to safety.

7. Gawain (pg.118)

The brother of the two knights slain by Lancelot was Gawain. He had been a knight to King Arthur for years and was one of Arthur's most trusted allies. Gawain's anger for Lancelot was deep and insatiable. Nothing would end his anger except the death of Lancelot. Arthur, who now controlled many fewer knights than before, could not risk losing his greatest ally, so, Arthur and his remaining troops camped around the stronghold where Lancelot now lived in France. Guinevere had long since been returned to Camelot after Lancelot vowed to all that no affair had ever taken place. Guinevere was safe because of Lancelot's lie, but Gawain's anger still demanded that Lancelot die. The siege lasted weeks. During the siege, Arthur received a note that said that Mordred had told the people that Arthur had died in battle and that Mordred was now King. The note also said that Mordred had vowed to take Guinevere as his wife.

Arthur immediately returned to Camelot with all of his forces. There was a great battle in which Gawain, Arthur and Mordred were slain. Mordred killed Arthur and as he died, Arthur's stroke also killed his son Mordred.

UK edition: "Fall of Camelot" (1986, 2003, ISBN 0705408957, 1844471810)
German edition: "Die Ritter der Tafelrunde" (1986, 1995, ISBN 9061828678, 3896040049)
French edition: "La fin du roi Arthur" (1986, ISBN 2734403765)
Russian edition: "Padenie Kamelota" (1996, ISBN 5300006033)

==== "Magical Justice" (1986, ISBN 0809452693, 0809452707) ====
- Chapter One: The Code (pg.6)
  - The Prodigal Mill (pg.8)
  - A Harsh Payment in Kind (pg.16)
  - The King of Beasts Returns a Favor (pg.19)
  - The Dutiful Daughter (pg.20)
  - The Waters of Hell and Heaven (pg.24)
  - An Artful Ally (pg.30)
  - Purgation in the Wilderness (pg.34)
  - Raiment beyond Compare (pg.36)
  - The Beggar's Bride (pg.40)
  - A Quest for Expiation (pg.42)
  - The Trees' Perpetual Penance (pg.43)
  - A Perilous Courtship (pg.44)
- Chapter Two: Fortune's Wheel (pg.56)
  - Parrying the Forces of Fate (pg.58)
  - Beloved of the Gods (pg.66)
  - The Warrior King who Scorned a Goddess (pg.70)
  - A Slanderer Undone (pg.72)
  - The Wrath of Artemis (pg.78)
  - The Cruel Reply to a Mortal's Boast (pg.82)
  - Following the Trail of Corruption (pg.84)
  - A Well-Intentioned Blunder (pg.89)
  - Wanderers on a Road without End (pg.90)
- Chapter Three: The Mediators (pg.102)
  - A Celestial Usurper (pg.104)
  - An Evil Loosed upon the World (pg.108)
  - A Futile Flight from Retribution (pg.110)
  - Summons at the Hour of Doom (pg.114)
  - An Enchanted Snare for the Envious (pg.116)
  - A Discriminating Distillation (pg.122)
  - The Cold Light of Justice (pg.124)
  - Stranger at the Revels (pg.126)
  - Paths to a Final Reckoning (pg.130)

UK edition: "Magical Justice" (1986, ISBN 0705408973)
German edition: "Triumph der Gerechtigkeit" (1987, ISBN 9061828694)
French edition: "Justice magique" (1987, ISBN 2734403870)
Russian edition: "Volshebnaia spravedlivost" (1996, ISBN 5300006173)

==== "Lore of Love" (1987, ISBN 0809452812, 0809452820) ====
- Chapter One: Destiny's Playthings (pg.6)
  - A Groom for the Sea-Lord's Daughter (pg.8)
  - The God of Marriages (pg.18)
  - Maiden's Questions (pg.24)
  - A Love Forgotten (pg.26)
  - The Cursed Embrace (pg.32)
  - A Rendezvous in Dreams (pg.36)
- Chapter Two: Blighted Passions (pg.50)
  - An Aztec Couple's Reunion (pg.52)
  - Recipes for Romance (pg.58)
  - The Stone Avenger (pg.60)
  - The Pot of Basil (pg.64)
  - The Tale of a Demon-Bride (pg.68)
  - Vanity's Reflection (pg.74)
  - Doomed Trysts (pg.76)
  - The Obsession (pg.78)
  - A Warlock's Comeuppance (pg.84)
  - An Ill-Starred Mating of Earth and Sea (pg.86)
- Chapter Three: True Love Triumphant (pg.96)
  - The Soldier and the Saracen Maiden (pg.98)
  - Rescue from the Underworld (pg.108)
  - Travails of an Indian Queen (pg.110)
  - The Enchanter's Snare (pg.120)
  - Deathless Devotion (pg.122)
  - Of a Knight and his Lady Lost (pg.128)

UK edition: "Lore of Love" (1987, ISBN 0705409007); this UK version differs from the US one by featuring a dark green cloth cover instead of the purple cover of the US edition
German edition: "Liebesglück und Liebesleid" (1987, ISBN 9061829348)
French edition: "Histoires d'amour" (1987, ISBN 2734404028)
Russian edition: "Skazaniia o liubvi" (1996, ISBN 530000667X

==== "The Book of Beginnings" (1986, ISBN 0809452650, 0809452669) ====
Creation myths and folklore.

- Chapter One: Out of Chaos (pg.6)
  - The Water-Mother (pg.9)
  - A Terrestrial Paradise (pg.17)
  - First Fruits (pg.24)
  - Fall of the Sky Maiden (pg.26)
  - The Trembling Earth (pg.35)
  - Fiery Lairs of Gods and Monsters (pg.38)
  - Phaethon's Folly (pg.40)
- Chapter Two: Celestial Lore (pg.50)
  - Cleaving the Day (pg.52)
  - The Twin Luminants (pg.56)
  - The Light-Eaters* (pg.62)
  - The Fractured Moon (pg.64)
  - Lunar Denizens (pg.70)
  - Lindu's Astral Veil (pg.72)
  - Hieroglyphics of the Heavens (pg.74)
  - Dark Dramas of the Firmament (pg.82)
- Chapter Three: The Dance of Life (pg.96)
  - The Primal Potter (pg.98)
  - A Tale of Many Tails (pg.100)
  - A Red Badge of Courage (pg.106)
  - A Feathered Heraldry (pg.110)
  - The Fox and the Fishes (pg.112)
  - A Muddy Metamorphosis (pg.114)
  - A Glorious Genesis (pg.116)
  - The Garden of the Gods (pg.118)
  - Bequest of a Golden Stranger (pg.124)
  - Noah's Miraculous Voyage (pg.130)

UK edition: "The Book of Beginnings" (1986, ISBN 0705408965)
German edition: "Mythen der Urzeit" (1987, 1995, ISBN 9061828686, 3896040065)
French edition: "Le Livre des commencements" (1987, ISBN 273440382X)
Russian edition:"Kniga nachal" (1996, ISBN 530000717X)

==== "Tales of Terror" (1987, ISBN 0809452774, 0809452782) ====
- Chapter One: The Walking Dead of Brittany (pg.6)
- Chapter Two: An Implacable Army (pg.22)
- Chapter Three: In the Body of the Beast (pg.28)
- Chapter Four: Harvest of Horrors (pg.36)
- Chapter Five: The Goblin's Guest (pg.54)
- Chapter Six: An Unfinished Death (pg.62)
- Chapter Seven: Furies of the Far North (pg.70)
- Chapter Eight: Bloodguilt of a Royal House (pg.78)
- Chapter Nine: A Story Reckoning (pg.88)
- Chapter Ten: Bride of the Ghost-Chief (pg.96)
- Chapter Eleven: The Kiss of Evil (pg.106)
- Chapter Twelve: Demons of the Dreamtime (pg.122)
- Chapter Thirteen: The Healer's Secret (pg.130)

UK edition: "Tales of Terror" (1987, ISBN 070540899X)
German edition: "Gruselgeschichten" (1987, ISBN 906182933X)
French edition: "Histoires terrifiantes" (1987, ISBN 2734403986)
Russian edition: "Skazaniia uzhasov" (1996, ISBN 5300008281)

==== "The Secret Arts" (1987, ISBN 0809452855, 0809452863) ====
- Chapter One: The Power of the Word (pg.6)
  - The Secret Script of Egypt's Priestly Mages (pg.8)
  - Inscriptions Charged with Occult Force (pg.15)
  - A Hoary Charm from Magic's Morning (pg.17)
  - A Calligraphic Cure for Stomach Pains (pg.22)
- Chapter Two: Decoding Destiny (pg.24)
  - Revelations Writ in Flesh (pg.27)
  - An Arithmetical Talisman (pg.36)
  - Mother of All the Triads (pg.37)
  - Ghostly Replicas Presaging Doom (pg.39)
  - The Esoteric Number (pg.40)
- Chapter Three: Arcane Harmonies (pg.44)
  - Collusions of Sweet Sounds and Savagery (pg.46)
  - A Demon Army Put to Flight (pg.54)
- Chapter Four: The Witch's Kitchen (pg.60)
  - A Lethal Antidote to Hostile Spells (pg.72)
  - Opening Windows on a Hidden World (pg.73)
- Chapter Five: Lapidary Lore (pg.80)
  - The Chain of Cosmic Connections (pg.86)
  - Living Liquid Turned to Stone (pg.89)
  - A Sage's Golden Quest (pg.94)
- Chapter Six: Mirrors and Metals (pg.100)
  - Trapped in an Enchanter's Web (pg.109)
  - A Romany Ritual to Catch a Thief (pg.110)
- Chapter Seven: A Magician's Arsenal (pg.114)
  - Defenses against Spiritual Assault (pg.124)
  - The War between Light and Darkness (pg.132)

UK edition: "The Secret Arts" (1987, ISBN 0705409015)
German edition: "Die magischen Künste" (1987, ISBN 9061829356)
French edition: "Les Secrets de la magie" (1987, ISBN 2734404079)
Russian edition: "Taĭnye iskusstva" (1996, ISBN 5300006742)

==== "Gods and Goddesses" (1987, ISBN 0809452731, 080945274X) ====
- Chapter One: God-Kings of the Nile (pg.6)
- Chapter Two: The Passions of Olympus (pg.30)
  - The Morrigan Spectral Queen of War and its Wake (pg.62)
- Chapter Three: Denizens of Eternity (pg.70)
  - A Tale of Radiance Reborn (pg.90)
- Chapter Four: Prideful Rulers of the Elder World (pg.100)
  - Doom Unleashed (pg.126)

UK edition: "Gods and Goddesses" (1987, 2004, ISBN 0705408981, 1844471837)
German edition: "Göttinnen und Götter" (1987, ISBN 9061829321)
French edition: "Dieux et deesses" (1987, ISBN 2734403935)
Russian edition: "Bogi i bogini" (1996, ISBN 5300005878)

== Promotion ==
The Enchanted World was advertised with a series of commercials transmitted either in first-run syndication or during late-night television programming. The first of these known to be transmitted featured four people who described themselves as being in touch with the Enchanted World:
1. Susan Hammett, who called herself an authentic witch. She began the first commercial by saying:

"People think witches exist only in fairy tales. I'm living proof that we're real--and still around today! In fact...I'm from a long line of witches".

2. Litany Burns, a self-styled clairvoyant. Her statement was:

"Ever since I was a little girl, I could detect objects that aren't visible to ordinary senses. So ghosts are nothing new to me. I've seen them many times".

3. Olga Hayes, a tarot card reader. According to her statement:

"The tarot cards are over five hundred years old. With them, I can tell a person's future. I can also tell what they were--in another life".

And
4. Wayne Weiseman, a self-styled psychic and the only male on-camera participant in the commercial. As he phrased his contacts with the Enchanted World:

"There are times when I find myself in another world. The bespectacled Weiseman here removed his eye-glasses and faced the camera more directly. I'm actually there. A lot of people have this power. They just have to develop it".

At least two of the later commercials featured actor Vincent Price, well known for his frequent roles in horror films:

- The first of these, which featured a series of animals—first a rabbit, then a crow or a raven, then a frog, then a cat—transforming into each from the last through special photographic effects, had him, as the narrator, exhorting viewers, "Enter 'The Enchanted World'". At the end of this commercial, the cat transformed—again, through special photographic effects—into a human; specifically, self-styled authentic witch Susan Hammett from the previous commercial, who pointed out, "After all, how can you be sure witches don't exist--if you don't know what one looks like?"
- In the second, Price was shown on camera promoting the series and reading at least one of the books by candlelight. At one point, a gust of wind from an open window blew out the candle, which Price re-lit with a match. Then, through lighting trickery, his skin turned glowing green.

All the commercials ended with announcer Ted Alexander providing a toll-free telephone number for viewers to call, together with a mailing address where payment for each book in the series could be sent after a ten-day trial.

The television ad campaigns, such as the 1987 one on MTV, were complementary to Time-Life's standard operating procedure of sending out elaborate multi-sheet mailings to their already existing customer base, in which a series was introduced in detail to a potential subscriber; having taken out a subscription once, a customer was then registered in Time-Life Books' customer database, at the time a crucial business model marketing tool for the company, making that customer eligible for receiving the company's book series promotional direct mailings henceforth.

As was customary for Time-Life Books at the time when a subscription was taken out, the first book sent (typically the "Wizards and Witches" volume in this case) was done so on a ten-day trial basis at a reduced price, after which each bi-monthly next installment could be assessed by customers on the same basis. That first book came additionally with a free bonus gift in the form of a set of gypsy fortune telling cards, which became a collectible in its own right in recent years. Customers were allowed to keep the card set even if they decided to return the volume it came with.

== Reception ==
British genre author Colin Greenland reviewed "Fairies and Elves" for the contemporary May 1985 issue of Imagine magazine, and called it "a big colour book, of fairy stories and paintings, medieval, Elizabethan and Victorian, all jumbled together with little sense of history or meaning". Compatriot and fellow genre author Katie Metcalfe on the other hand, had much later become far more favorably inclined towards the series by stating on her "Wyrd Words & Effigies" website that she was, "[...]an enormous fan of the fabulous Enchanted World books, published by Time Life Books in the 1980's. In the past, I've reviewed "Night Creatures" and "Ghosts" and have done so with lashings of praise. "Seekers and Saviours" is the final book in my collection, sadly, and I feel an ache in my heart knowing there will be no more reviews of Enchanted World publications". Metcalfe's sentiments have been shared by various latter-day YouTube vloggers.
