= South Pacific (disambiguation) =

The South Pacific Ocean or "South Pacific" is the Southern Hemisphere portion of the Pacific Ocean.

South Pacific may also refer to:

== Arts and entertainment ==
- South Pacific (novel), a 1992 book by James A. Michener
- Tales of the South Pacific, a 1947 collection of short stories by James A. Michener

=== TV, film and theater ===
- South Pacific (musical), a 1949 musical play by Rodgers and Hammerstein
  - South Pacific (1958 film), an adaptation
  - South Pacific (2001 film), a television production
- South Pacific, a 1943 play by Howard Rigsby and Dorothy Heyward, staged on Broadway by Lee Strasberg
- Survivor: South Pacific, the 23rd season of the American TV show Survivor, which took place in Samoa
- South Pacific (TV series), a 2009 BBC nature documentary series
- South Pacific Television, a former New Zealand broadcasting company

=== Music ===
- Southpacific, a space rock band from Canada
- South Pacific (original Broadway cast recording), a 1949 album containing a recording of the musical South Pacific
- South Pacific (Decca album), a 1949 album featuring Bing Crosby
- South Pacific (soundtrack), a soundtrack to the 1958 film South Pacific
- South Pacific in Hi-Fi, a 1958 jazz album by the Chico Hamilton Quintet
- "South Pacific", a 1993 song by the Verve from Voyager 1

== Other uses ==
- Bank South Pacific, a bank in Papua New Guinea
- South Pacific Pictures, a New Zealand television and film production company
- South Pacific Television, a defunct New Zealand television channel
- University of the South Pacific, a public university with locations across a dozen countries
- South Pacific Area, a multinational U.S.-led military command active during World War II

== See also ==
- List of islands in the Pacific Ocean
- North Pacific (disambiguation)
- Pacific Ocean Areas (command)
- Pacific Ocean theater of World War II
- South Pacific Airlines of New Zealand, operating from 1960 to 1966
- South Pacific Applied Geoscience Commission, an inter-governmental regional organisation
- South Pacific Commission, former name of the Secretariat of the Pacific Community
- South Pacific Division of Seventh-day Adventists, one of the 13 world divisions of the church
- South Pacific Tourism Organisation, an inter-governmental body for the tourism sector
- South Pacific Trade Commission, former name of the Pacific Islands Trade and Investment Commission
- South West Pacific theatre of World War II, a theatre of the war between the Allies and Japan
