= Thomas Heathfield Carrick =

English painter

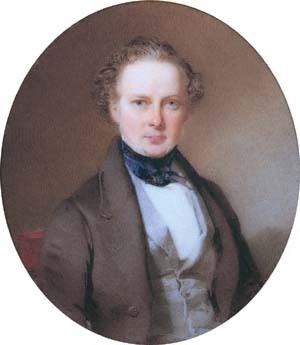
Thomas Allom by Carrick (1846)

Thomas Heathfield Carrick (4 July 1802 – 1874) was an English portrait miniature painter who portrayed many leading political and literary figures of his age. He developed the method of painting portraits on marble rather than the usual ivory.

== Life and work ==
Carrick was born in Upperby, near Carlisle in Cumberland (now Cumbria), the son of John Carrick (d. 1852), thought to be a Carlisle Mill owner but listed on the register of births as a calico printer, and Mary (née) Anderson. He was educated at Carlisle Grammar School and by his uncle, the Rev. John Topping. He was said to be self-taught in art, but since he also began exhibiting at the Carlisle Academy in 1827, it is likely that he also attended art classes there.

After a quarrel, Carrick left home, trained, and then set up as a chemist (in Carlisle). While in business he continued to paint miniatures, despite never having seen an example by another artist, apart from himself, until he came across a piece by William Charles Ross. He gradually built up a reputation as a portraitist in the locality, painting, for example, the actor Charles Kean (who was beginning to win popularity as a provincial actor).

On 27 July 1829, he married Mary Mulcaster by whom he had five children. He was eventually able to sell up his apothecary business, and moved to Newcastle upon Tyne in 1836 (after exhibiting there in 1835), then to London, with his family, in November 1839. From 1841 to 1866, he exhibited his work at the Royal Academy, but never accepted an associateship.

Amongst his illustrious subjects were Thomas Carlyle, Sir Robert Peel, Lord John Russell, William Wordsworth, Samuel Rogers, Caroline Norton, Eliza Cook, William Charles Macready, Nellie Farren, Luigi Lablache, Henry Wadsworth Longfellow, Daniel O'Connell and Robert Owen. In 1845, he received a medal from Prince Albert for his work in painting miniatures on marble.

Carrick abandoned miniature painting in 1868, the profession having been superseded by photography, and retired to Newcastle, having been awarded the Turner annuity (a pension) by the Royal Academy a year before his retirement. There he died in 1874.

His son, John Mulcaster Carrick (1833–1896) was a landscape and figure painter. Among Carrick's pupils was landscape artist John Henry Mole (1814–1886).
