= Julia Cunningham =

American writer

Julia Woolfolk Cunningham (October 4, 1916 – February 27, 2008) was an American author of children's literature. She is best remembered for her novel Dorp Dead which won the Lewis Carroll Shelf Award, and for The Treasure Is The Rose which was a finalist for the National Book Award. Her 1980 book, A Mouse called Junction, was illustrated by Michael Hague.

She was sister to John W. Cunningham, a Western author who created the story of the 1952 Western film High Noon. Her first cousin was the neuroscientist and physician John C. Lilly.
