= John Carrick =

John Carrick may refer to:

- John de Carrick (died 1380), Scottish Chancellor and bishop
- John Carrick (botanist) (1914–1978), botanist and author of plant names
- John Carrick (Australian politician) (1918–2018)
- John James Carrick (1873–1966), Canadian real estate promoter and political figure from Ontario
- John Mulcaster Carrick (1833–1896), painter
- John Donald Carrick (1787–1837), Scottish journalist and songwriter

== See also ==
- John Carik, a comic book character
