= Michael Hague =

American illustrator (1948–2026)

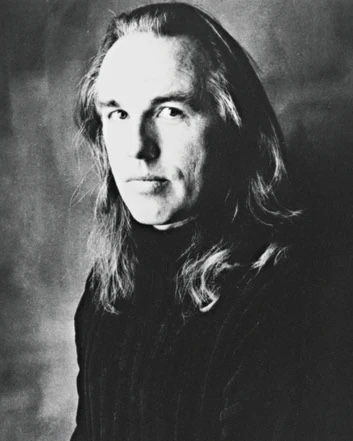
- Born: September 8, 1948; Los Angeles, California, U.S.
- Died: March 10, 2026 (aged 77)
- Known for: Children's book illustrations
- Notable work: The Wind in the Willows, The Hobbit, Children’s book of Virtues, Alice in Wonderland, The book of Dragons

Michael Hague (September 8, 1948 – March 10, 2026) was an American illustrator, primarily of children's fantasy books.

== Life and career ==
Among the books, he has illustrated classics such as The Wind in the Willows, The Wizard of Oz, The Hobbit and the stories of Hans Christian Andersen. He was known for the intricate and realistic detail he brought to his work, and the rich colors he chose.

Hague trained at the Art Center College of Design in Los Angeles. He listed his influences as the comics series Prince Valiant and the works of Disney, Japanese printmakers Hiroshige and Hokusai, and turn of the 20th century illustrators Arthur Rackham, W. Heath Robinson, N. C. Wyeth and Howard Pyle. His first big break came through Trina Schart Hyman, who as an art director for Cricket, gave him several cover art assignments.

He collaborated with family members on some works. In 2008, he and his son, graphic designer Devon Hague, produced the graphic novel In the Small. He and his wife, author Kathleen Hague, have also collaborated on several books together. They lived in Colorado Springs, where he donated time each year to making a poster for the nonprofit arts organization Imagination Celebration.

Hague died on March 10, 2026, at the age of 77.

== Books illustrated ==
- Gulliver in Lilliput: A Hallmark Pop-Up Book (Hallmark Children’s Editions, 1975)
- The Cabbage Moth and the Shamrock by Ethel Marbach (Green Tiger Press, 1978)
- Dream Weaver by Jan Yolen (Collins, 1979)
- A Necklace of Fallen Stars by Beth Hilgartner (Little, Brown, 1879)
- Beauty and the Beast retold by Deborah Apy (Holt, Rhinehart & Winston, 1980)
- Demetrius and the Golden Goblet by Eve Bunting (Harcourt, Brace, Jovanovich, 1980)
- Dragons of Light by Orson Scott Card and Dave Smeds (Ace Books, 1980) ISBN 0-441-16660-1
- East of the Sun and West of the Moon retold by Kathleen and Michael Hague (Harcourt Brace Jovanovich, 1980) ISBN 0-15-224703-3
- Moments: Poems about the Seasons edited by Lee Bennett Hopkins (Harcourt Brace Jovanovich, 1980)
- A Mouse called Junction by Julia Cunningham (Pantheon, 1980)
- The Wind in the Willows by Kenneth Grahame (Henry Holt & Co., 1980)
- The Man Who Kept House (Harcourt Brace Jovanovich, 1981)
- Michael Hague's Favourite Hans Christian Andersen Fairy Tales by Hans Christian Andersen and Jane S. Woodward (Holt, Rhinehart & Winston, 1981)
- The Night before Christmas by Clement C. Moore (Holt, Rinehart & Winston, 1981)
- The Unicorn and the Lake by Marianna Mayer (Dial Books for Young Readers, 1982)
- The Dragon Kite by Nancy Luenn (Harcourt Brace Jovanovich, 1982)
- The Wizard of Oz by L. Frank Baum (Holt, Rinehart & Winston 1982)
- The Lion, the Witch, and the Wardrobe by C.S. Lewis (Macmillan, 1983)
- The Reluctant Dragon by Kenneth Grahame (Holt, Rinehart & Winston, 1983)
- The Velveteen Rabbit by Margery Williams (Holt, Rhinehart & Winston, 1983)
- Alphabears: An ABC Book by Kathleen Hague (Holt, Rinehart & Winston, 1984)
- The Frog Princess retold by Elizabeth Isle (Thomas Y. Crowell, 1984)
- The Hobbit by J. R. R. Tolkien (Houghton Mifflin, 1984)
- Mother Goose: A Collection of Classic Nursery Rhymes (Holt, Rinehart & Winston, 1984)
- Rapunzel by Jakob Grimm and Wilhelm Grimm (Creative Education, 1984)
- Aesop's Fables (Holt, Rinehart & Winston, 1985)
- Alice’s Adventures in Wonderland by Lewis Carroll (Holt, Rinehart & Winston, 1985)
- A Child's Book of Prayers (Holt, Rinehart & Winston, 1985)
- The Legend of the Veery Bird by Kathleen Hague (Harcourt Brace Jovanovich, 1985)
- Numbears: A Counting Book by Kathleen Hague (Holt, Rinehart & Winston, 1986)
- Out of the Nursery, into the Night by Kathleen Hague (Holt, Rinehart & Winston, 1986)
- Enchanted World Series
  - Seekers and Saviors (1986), vol. 12
  - Fabled Lands (1986), vol. 13
- Michael Hague's World of Unicorns (Holt, Rinehart & Winston, 1986), revised as Michael Hague's Magical World of Unicorns (Simon & Schuster Books for Young Readers, 1999)
- Unicorn Pop-up Book (Holt, Rinehart & Winston, 1986)
- Peter Pan by J.M. Barrie (Henry Holt & Co., 1987)
- The Secret Garden by Frances Hodgson Burnett (Henry Holt, 1987)
- The Land of Nod, and Other Poems for Children by Robert Louis Stevenson (Holt, Rinehart & Winston, 1988)
- Rootabaga Stories, Part One by Carl Sandburg (Harcourt Brace Jovanovich, 1988)
- Rootabaga Stories, Part Two by Carl Sandburg (Harcourt Brace Jovanovich, 1989)
- Bear Hugs by Kathleen Hague (Holt, Rinehart & Winston, 1989)
- Cinderella and Other Tales from Perrault (Henry Holt & Co., 1989)
- The Fairies by William Allingham (Henry Holt & Co., 1989)
- The Unicorn Alphabet by Marianna Mayer (Dial, 1989)
- Old Mother West Wind by Thornton W. Burgess (Holt, Rinehart & Winston, 1990)
- Jingle Bells (Henry Holt & Co, 1990)
- Prairie-Town Boy by Carl Sandburg [With Joe Krush] (Harcourt Brace Jovanovich, 1990)
- My Secret Garden Diary (Arcade, 1990)
- Magic Moments: A Book of Days (Arcade, 1990)
- Our Baby: A Book of Records and Memories (Arcade, 1990)
- A Unicorn Journal (Arcade, 1990)
- The Borrowers by Mary Norton (Harcourt Brace Jovanovich, 1991)
- The Pilgrim's Regress by C. S. Lewis (Wm. B. Eerdmans Publishing Co.; 1992)
- Michael Hague's Illustrated "The Teddy Bears' Picnic” (Holt, Rinehart & Winston, 1992)
- Twinkle, Twinkle, Little Star (Morrow Junior Books, 1992)
- South Pacific retold by James A. Michener (Harcourt Brace Jovanovich, 1992)
- The Rainbow Fairy Book (Morrow, 1993)
- The Fairy Tales of Oscar Wilde (Michael O’Mara Books, 1993)
- The Little Mermaid by Hans Christian Andersen (Holt, Rinehart & Winston, 1993)
- Little Women by Louisa May Alcott (Holt, Rinehart & Winston, 1993)
- Teddy Bear, Teddy Bear: A Classic Action Rhyme (Morrow, 1993)
- Sleep, Baby, Sleep: Lullabies and Night Poems (Morrow, 1994)
- The Book of Dragons (Morrow, 1995)
- The Children's Book of Virtues edited by William J. Bennett (Simon & Schuster, 1995)
- Michael Hague's Family Christmas Treasury (Holt, Rinehart & Winston, 1995)
- The Owl and the Pussy-Cat, and Other Nonsense Poems (North-South Books, 1995)
- Michael Hague's Family Easter Treasury (Holt, Rinehart & Winston, 1996)
- The Perfect Present (Morrow, 1996)
- The Children’s Book of Heroes edited by William J. Bennett (Simon & Schuster, 1997)
- The Story of Doctor Dolittle by Hugh Lofting (Books of Wonder, 1997)
- The Children's Book of America edited by William J. Bennett (Simon & Schuster, 1998)
- The Twenty-third Psalm: From the King James Bible (Holt, Rinehart & Winston, 1999)
- Ten Little Bears: A Counting Rhyme (Morrow, 1999)
- The Book of Fairies (HarperCollins, 2000)
- The Children's Treasury of Virtues edited by William J. Bennett (Simon & Schuster, 2000)
- The Children's Book of Faith edited by William J. Bennett (Doubleday, 2000)
- A Wind in the Willows Christmas (SeaStar Books, 2000)
- The Book of Pirates (HarperCollins, 2001)
- Kate Culhane, a Ghost Story (SeaStar Books, 2001)
- The Tale of Peter Rabbit by Beatrix Potter (2001) ISBN 1-58717-052-3
- The Voyages of Doctor Dolittle by Hugh Lofting (Books of Wonder, 2001)
- The Children's Book of Home and Family edited by William J. Bennett (Doubleday Books for Young Readers, 2002)
- Good Night, Fairies by Kathleen Hague (SeaStar Books, 2002)
- The Teddy Bears' Picnic by Jimmy Kennedy (Henry Holt, 2002)
- The Life and Adventures of Santa Claus by L. Frank Baum (Henry Holt, 2003)
- The Nutcracker (Chronicle, 2003)
- The Book of Fairy Poetry (HarperCollins, 2004)
- Where Fairies Dance (Harper Collins, 2004)
- Legendary Creatures of Myth and Magic by Marianna Mayer (Madison Park Press, 2006)
- Lionel and the Book of Beasts by E. Nesbit, retold by Michael Hague (HarperCollins, 2006)
- Animal Friends: A Collection of Poems for Children (Henry Holt, 2007)
- Little Bitty Mousie by Jim Aylesworth (Walker & Company, 2007)
- The Book of Wizards (HarperCollins, 2008)
- In the Small (Little, Brown, 2008)
- Irving Berlin’s White Christmas (HarperCollins, 2010)
- Michael Hague’s Treasured Classics (Chronicle, 2011)
- Michael Hague's Read-to-Me Book of Fairy Tales (HarperCollins, 2013)
