= A Mouse Called Junction =

1980 children's book by Julia Cunningham

- Author: Julia Cunningham
- Illustrator: Michael Hague
- Language: English
- Genre: Children's fiction
- Published: March 12, 1980
- Publisher: Pantheon Books
- Publication place: United States
- Pages: 32 (unpaged)
- ISBN: 0-394-84112-3

A Mouse Called Junction is a 1980 children's picture book by Julia Cunningham, with illustrations by Michael Hague. About a young mouse who ventures into the forest in search of emotions and is adopted by a rat, it received mixed reviews that praised Hague's illustrations but criticized the text and ending.

== Synopsis ==
Junction, the youngest mouse in his family, lives a cozy life without having ever experienced emotions. One day, he leaves his home for the first time in search of them, and in doing so, encounters the dangers of the forest. When an owl carries him off, he is rescued by a rat whom the forest animals warn is a threat, but comes to adopt him and treats him like a prince.

== Themes ==
In The New York Times, Natalie Babbitt wrote: "Perhaps the point of the book is this: Test things out for yourself instead of accepting ready-made opinions. Maybe. But the fact that it can be read in two such different ways is surely significant." According to Kirkus Reviews, "One might speculate on why the mouse is called Junction, but not very profitably. Cunningham shows him at a junction in his life, a protected wide-eyed innocent eager for experience and unacquainted with tears, fear, or hunger."

== Reception ==
Publisher Pantheon Books promoted A Mouse Called Junction as "a picture book of classic majesty". Reviews were mixed; the School Library Journal criticized the text for its "surprising illogic and insensitivity", along with its ending, at the expense of Hague's "rich, detailed, darkly mysterious" watercolor work. Ruth M. Stein of Language Arts expressed similar feelings, as did Babbitt. "There is something disturbing about this story," the latter wrote, "something vaguely kinked in the suggestion that there is pleasure in discomfort.... And the richness of Julia Cunningham's language only compounds the problem." The Fort Worth Star-Telegram found it "a so-what book" that came off as "rather shallow and forced."

Conversely, The Reading Teacher said, "The beauty of the language and the full-page illustrations make this [story] a winner." The Poughkeepsie Journal likewise praised it for its "exceedingly polished prose and superb artistry". Jane Yolen of Massachusetts' Daily Hampshire Gazette commended its strengths, but added, "I wish this had been a bigger[, older] book. It feels like a sketch for something more sophisticated."
