= Carrick Heaths =

Protected area in Cornwall, England

- Site of Special Scientific Interest
- Location within Cornwall Location within England
- Location of Carrick Heaths.
- Area of search: Cornwall
- Grid reference: SW800490
- Coordinates: 50.3003°N 5.0899°W
- Interest: Biological
- Area: 42.7 hectares (0.427 km^{2}; 0.165 sq mi)
- Notification date: 1973

Carrick Heaths is a Site of Special Scientific Interest (SSSI), noted for its biological characteristics, in mid Cornwall, England, UK. It incorporates the old Silverwell Moor SSSI. Within the site the Red Data Book listed barn owl can be found.

== Geography ==
The SSSI comprises ten individual sites, spread over a 12 kilometres (7.5 mi) radius around the city of Truro, totalling an area of 42.7 hectares (106 acres). These are located at the OS grid references:

Site	OS grid reference
1	SW711462
2	SW748482
3	SW755456
4	SW788501
5	SW803473
6	SW729478
7	SW752463
8	SW791514
9	SW796489
10	SW852535
