= North Pacific (disambiguation) =

The North Pacific is the Northern Hemisphere portion of the Pacific Ocean, Earth's largest oceanic division.

It may also refer to:

== Transportation ==
- North Pacific (sidewheeler), a steamboat which operated in Western Canada and Alaska between 1871–1903
- North Pacific Airlines, operated in the US West Coast between 1987–1992
- North Pacific Coast Railroad, a Northern California rail line which operated between 1871–1907
- Northern Pacific Railway, a rail line in the Northern U.S. which operated between 1864–1970
- North Pacific Steamship Company
- North Pacific Yachts, a shipbuilding company founded in 2004

== Nature and wildlife ==
- North Pacific albatross
- North Pacific frostfish
- North Pacific Current
- North Pacific Gyre
- North Pacific hake
- North Pacific High
- North Pacific Anadromous Fish Commission
- North Pacific Intermediate Water
- North Pacific Fishery Management Council
- North Pacific Fur Seal Convention of 1911
- North Pacific Marine Science Organization
- North Pacific Oscillation

== Other uses ==
- NPC (cable system)
- North Pacific Coast Guard Agencies Forum
- North Pacific College
- North Pacific Football League
- North Pacific Group

== See also ==
- List of islands in the Pacific Ocean
