= John Mulcaster Carrick =

English painter

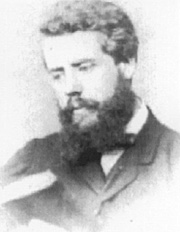
- Born: 1833; Carlisle
- Died: 22 September 1896 (aged 62–63); London

John Mulcaster Carrick (1833 – 22 September 1896) was an English Victorian painter, etcher, and illustrator. He painted mostly landscapes and genre subjects, in a loosely Pre-Raphaelite style.

== Life ==
Carrick was born in Carlisle in 1833 and baptised on 9 April. He took his surname from his father, Thomas Heathfield Carrick and his middle name from his mothers born name. His father was a chemist at the time, but he went on to be an artist in Newcastle in 1836 and is presumed to have trained his son. By 1839 the whole family were in London where Carrick was to remain for most of his life painting mostly landscapes.

He exhibited a study at the British Institution and a view of Borrowdale at the Royal Academy in 1854 and two more in 1855 and in 1856 the influential critic John Ruskin commented on "The Village Postman".

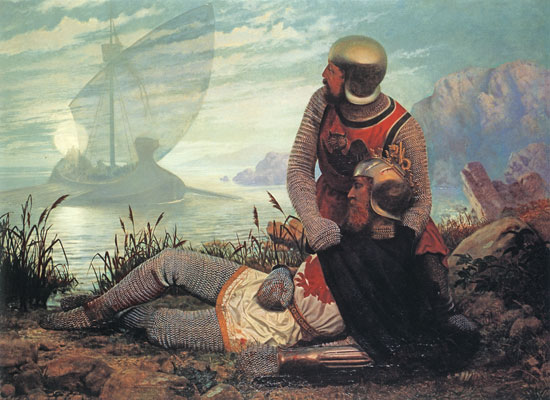
The Death of Arthur

The following year he exhibited, from the same address at the academy, two views of Borrowdale, and again in 1856. This time his work, The Village Postman, was noticed by John Ruskin as containing "more than usual fidelity" and "immense labour". The Spectator also chose this painting as "superior examples". The Athenaeum magazine commented on this painting and a view of Rydal which he exhibited the following year. The Atheneaum made no comment in 1859 but the following year they saw his picture of Nice in winter as a "delight [for] all lovers of nature".

By 1870 he was living with Louisa and his first son and his Spanish landscapes were now considered "Pre-Raphaelite". Both of his sons inherited some of his artistic abilities. He was working in Cornwall in 1871 and with the Newlyn artists by 1883.

He was interested in the Pre-Raphaelite style of painting and joined the Hogarth Club. He traveled in Switzerland and France.

Carrick died in his home in Chiswick at the age of 63. He has paintings in public collections in Glasgow and Dumfries and Galloway.

== Bibliography ==
- The Enchanted World: Legends of Valor (1984)
