= Tristram P. Coffin =

American folklorist (1922–2012)

Tristram Potter Coffin
- Born: February 13, 1922; San Marino, California
- Died: January 31, 2012 (aged 89); South Kingstown, Rhode Island
- Occupations: University professor, academic, author
- Known for: Leading scholar of ballad texts in the 20th century
- Spouse: Ruth Anne Hendrickson Coffin (May 28, 1922 - August 5, 2011)

Tristram Potter Coffin (February 13, 1922 – January 31, 2012) was an American folklorist and leading scholar of ballad texts in the 20th century. Coffin spent the bulk of his career at the University of Pennsylvania, where he was a professor of English and a co-founder of the Folklore Department. He was the author of 20 books and more than 100 scholarly articles and reviews.

== Biography ==
Coffin was born February 13, 1922, in San Marino, California, the son of Tristram Roberts Coffin, an investment banker formerly of Richmond, Indiana, and New York City, and Elsie Potter Robinson of Edgewood Farm, Wakefield, Rhode Island. He had an older sister, Trelsie Coffin Buffum Lucas (1918–1987); an older brother, Roberts Robinson Coffin, who died shortly after birth in 1920; and a younger brother, Peter Robinson Coffin (1923–1998), who was a college professor as well. He also had an older half-sister, Lydia, and half-brother, Richard, from his father's first marriage.

Coming to Rhode Island after his father died of influenza in 1927, he was educated at the Providence Country Day School, Moses Brown School (1939) in Providence, and then Haverford College (1943) outside of Philadelphia. After three years in the United States Army Air Corps and the Signal Corps during World War II, he completed an MA and a PhD from the University of Pennsylvania.

Through his father, he is a direct descendant of Tristram Coffin, one of the original permanent settlers on Nantucket Island in 1660.

In 1944, he married Ruth Anne ("Rusty") Hendrickson (May 28, 1922 – August 5, 2011), a Columbus, Ohio, native and school administrator, who attended the Madeira School in McLean, Virginia, and Bryn Mawr College in Bryn Mawr, Pennsylvania. They had four children, eleven grandchildren, and many dogs.

== Career ==
Coffin was a past Associate Professor of English at Granville, Ohio's Denison University, where he taught and coached (tennis and soccer) for nine years (1949–58). He was elected to the Denison University Athletic Hall of Fame in 1986 and the Tristram P. Coffin Scholarship was established in his and his wife Ruth Anne's honor in 1994 by William G. Bowen of The Andrew W. Mellon Foundation.

In 1959 he moved to the University of Pennsylvania in Philadelphia where he taught until his retirement. With MacEdward Leach, he co-founded the Department of Folklore at Penn, and was a full professor in both the English and Folklore departments, as well as Vice-Dean of the Graduate School of Arts and Sciences.

During his career he was also a guest professor at UCLA, the University of Rhode Island, Providence College, and in 1962 and 1963 was a Visiting Professor of Literature at the US Military Academy at West Point, one of the first civilians to lecture there. Upon retirement, he became a Lecturer in Folklore at Providence College and at the University of Rhode Island.

== Affiliations ==
Coffin was a former Secretary-Treasurer of the American Folklore Society, as well as Editor of their Memoir and their Bibliographical Series and was elected a Fellow of that group. A 1953 Guggenheim Fellow, he was the 20th century's top scholar of ballad texts, is listed in the Who's Who in America Millennium Edition, and was highly regarded internationally.

He was a member of Phi Beta Kappa society and Delta Upsilon fraternity. His club memberships included the Merion Cricket Club (Haverford, Pennsylvania), the URI University Club (Kingston, Rhode Island), The Dunes Club and the Point Judith Country Club (both Narragansett, Rhode Island).

== Television ==
While in Philadelphia, Coffin was active in educational television, appearing in over 100 shows on Folklore and Shakespeare. He was also host of the National Educational Television (forerunner of PBS) show, "Lyrics and Legends", which was shown nationally, and was editor-in-charge of the "American Folklore" series for Voice of America.

== Publications ==
Coffin was an authority on English, Scottish and American ballads. His book, The British Traditional Ballad in North America, has been a standard reference text for over 50 years. In addition to numerous scholarly publications, he also published several more commercial works. His The Book of Christmas Folklore was a Book-of-the-Month Club selection, and The Old Ball Game: Baseball in Folklore and Fiction, Uncertain Glory - The Folklore of the American Revolution, The Female Hero and The Proper Book of Sexual Folklore were widely read. With Hennig Cohen, he also published Folklore of the American Holidays, another standard reference. Finally, Dr. Coffin edited the book Our Living Traditions, in which folklorist Richard Dorson made the first known use of the phrase "urban legend." Altogether, Dr. Coffin published 20 books and over 100 articles, encyclopedia entries, and reviews.
