= South Pacific (novel) =

1992 novel by James Michener

The Novel
- First edition cover
- Author: James Michener
- Language: English
- Genre: Historical novel
- Publisher: Gulliver Books
- Publication date: 1992
- Publication place: United States
- Media type: Print (Hardback)
- Pages: 40
- ISBN: 0-15-200618-4

South Pacific (1992) is a book by American author James A. Michener.

As retold by Michener, the book is based on Rodgers and Hammerstein's award-winning musical, "South Pacific" based on Michener's 1947 book Tales of the South Pacific, about the lives of officers, nurses, a French expatriate, and natives on the islands of the South Pacific during World War II. Includes discussion of the original Broadway production and its cast. Unpaginated glossy pages with some beautiful full-page color illustrations.
