= John Henry Mole =

English painter

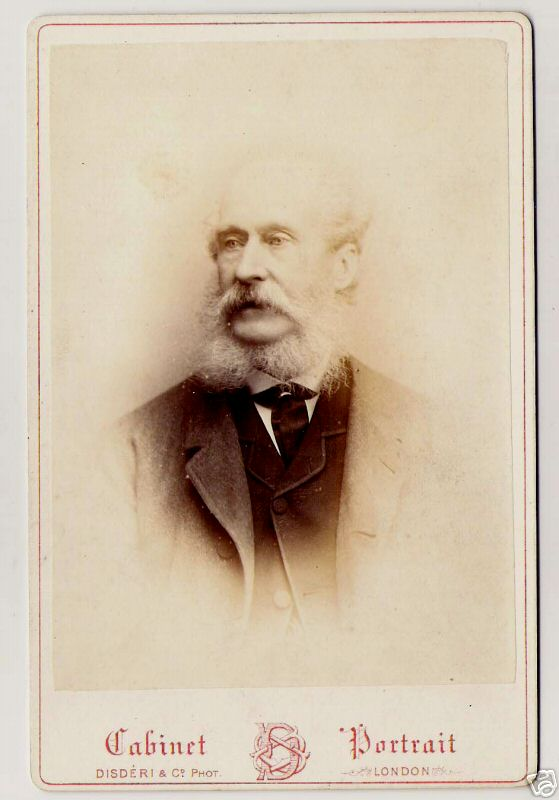
John Henry Mole in 1880

John Henry Mole (1814 – 13 December 1886) was an artist from Alnwick, Northumberland, in the north of England. He initially worked as a solicitor's clerk in Newcastle-upon-Tyne, before becoming a professional miniature painter in 1835, having no previous education in art. He later became a landscape painter, becoming an Associate Member of the New Society of Painters in Water-Colours (later the Royal Institute of Painters in Water Colours) in 1847 and a full Member the following year, becoming vice-president of the Society in 1884. In 1847 he abandoned miniatures to concentrate on landscapes and portraits of children. Although he lived in London, his works primarily depicted Northumbria, the Lake District and Scotland. A number of his works are held in museums in London and the North of England. He rests in Brompton Cemetery.
