= Impact of Tolkien's Middle-earth writings =

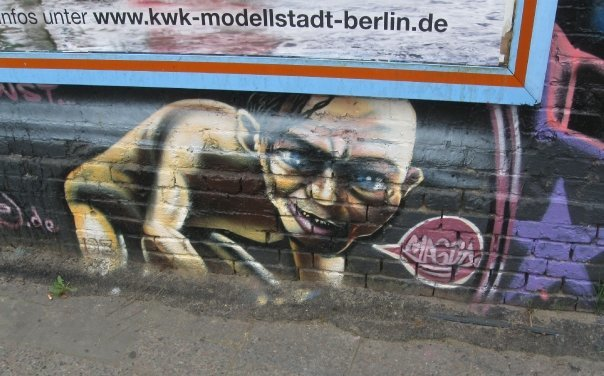
Gollum in street art, Germany, 2008

The fantasy writings of J. R. R. Tolkien have had a huge popular impact. His Middle-earth books have sold hundreds of millions of copies. The Lord of the Rings transformed the genre of fantasy writing. It and The Hobbit have spawned Peter Jackson's Middle-earth films, which have had billion-dollar takings at the box office. The books and films have stimulated enormous Tolkien fandom activity in meetings such as Tolkienmoot and on the Internet, with discussion groups, fan art, and many thousands of Tolkien fan fiction stories. The mythology's Orcs, Trolls, Dwarves, Elves, Wizards, and Halflings are firmly established in popular culture, such as in the tabletop role-playing game Dungeons & Dragons, and in Middle-earth video games. Individual characters like Gollum, too, have become familiar popular figures, for instance featuring in a song by Led Zeppelin.

== Context ==
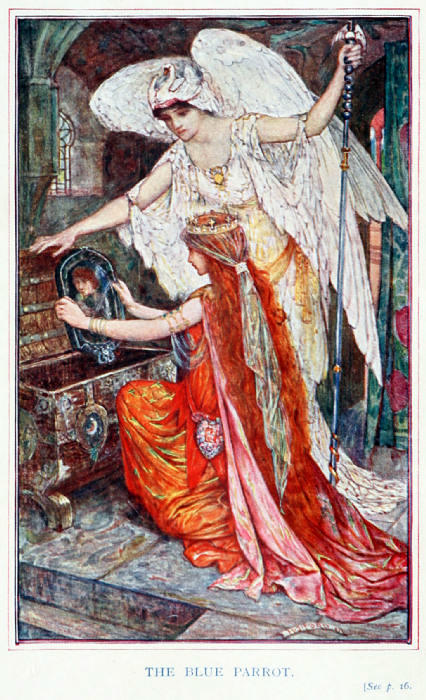
Fantasy before Tolkien: The Blue Parrot by H. J. Ford, for Andrew Lang's 1907 The Olive Fairy Book

J. R. R. Tolkien was an English author and philologist of ancient Germanic languages, specialising in Old English; he spent much of his career as a professor at the University of Oxford. He is best known for his novels about his invented Middle-earth, The Hobbit and The Lord of the Rings, and for the posthumously published The Silmarillion which provides a more mythical narrative about earlier ages. A devout Roman Catholic, he described The Lord of the Rings as "a fundamentally religious and Catholic work", rich in Christian symbolism. (Note: Carpenter 2023, letter #142 to Robert Murray, 2 December 1953) His Middle-earth books have sold hundreds of millions of copies.

== Media ==
=== Fantasy fiction ===
The Lord of the Rings transformed the genre of fantasy writing. Tolkien has been called the "father" of modern fantasy. The author and editor of Journal of the Fantastic in the Arts, Brian Attebery, writes that fantasy is defined "not by boundaries but by a centre", which is The Lord of the Rings.

Many later fantasy writers have either imitated Tolkien's work, or have written in reaction against it. One of the first was Ursula Le Guin's Earthsea series of novels, starting in 1968, which used Tolkienian archetypes such as wizards, a disinherited prince, a magical ring, a quest, and dragons. A publishing rush followed. Fantasy authors including Stephen R. Donaldson and Philip Pullman have created intentionally non-Tolkienian fantasies, Donaldson with an unloveable protagonist, and Pullman, who is critical of The Lord of the Rings, with a different view of the purpose of life.

=== Artwork ===
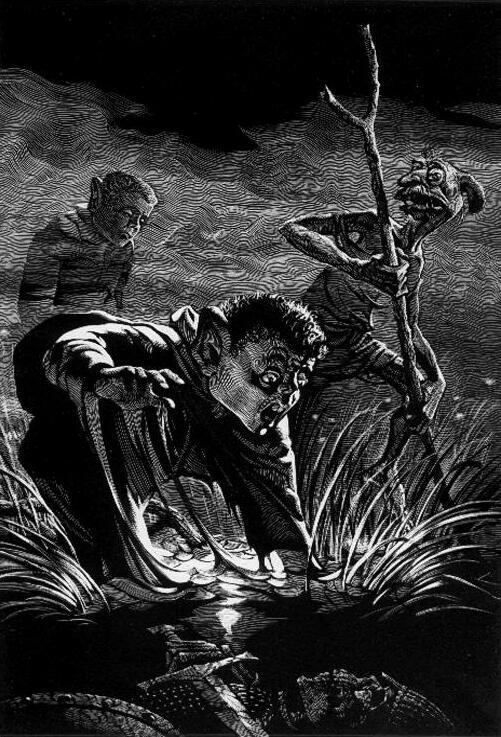
Frodo and Sam guided by Gollum through the Dead Marshes. Scraperboard illustration by Alexander Korotich

Since the publication of The Hobbit in 1937, artists have sought to capture aspects of Tolkien's Middle-earth fantasy novels in paintings and drawings. He liked the work of Cor Blok, Mary Fairburn, Queen Margrethe II of Denmark, and Ted Nasmith, but not the illustrations by Horus Engels for the German edition of The Hobbit. (Note: Carpenter 2023, #107 to Sir Stanley Unwin, 7 December 1946)

After Tolkien's death in 1973, many artists have created illustrations of Middle-earth characters and landscapes, in media ranging from Alexander Korotich's scraperboard depictions, to Margrethe II of Denmark's woodcut-style drawings, Sergey Yuhimov's Russian Orthodox icon-style representations, and Donato Giancola's neoclassical oil paintings. Peter Jackson's 2001–2003 film trilogy of The Lord of the Rings, and later of The Hobbit, made use of concept art by John Howe and Alan Lee; the resulting images of Middle-earth and the story's characters have strongly influenced subsequent representations of Tolkien's work. Jenny Dolfen has specialised in making watercolour paintings of The Silmarillion, winning three awards from The Tolkien Society.

=== Motion pictures ===
The Lord of the Rings and The Hobbit have spawned Peter Jackson's Middle-earth films, which have had billion-dollar takings at the box office.

=== Music ===
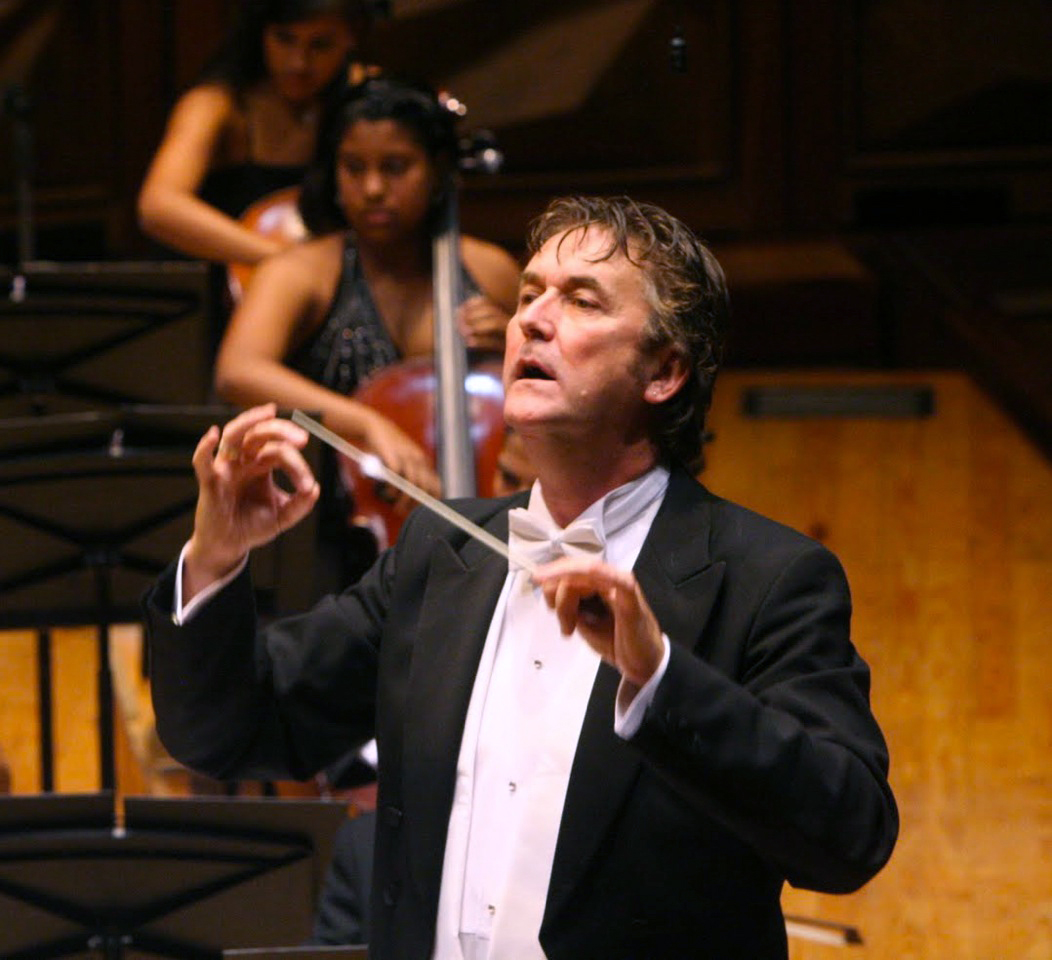
The Dutch composer and trombonist Johan de Meij's first symphony, in 5 movements, is entitled The Lord of the Rings.

A substantial body of music has been created on the basis of Tolkien's works, in a wide range of genres from classical to many kinds of popular music including jazz, blues, country and western, new age, heavy metal, and psychedelic. Donald Swann's 1967 song cycle The Road Goes Ever On sets six of Tolkien's songs to music. The Danish group The Tolkien Ensemble set all the poetry in The Lord of the Rings to music, publishing it on four CDs – An Evening in Rivendell (1997), A Night in Rivendell (2000), At Dawn in Rivendell (2002), and (with Christopher Lee) Leaving Rivendell (2005). Classical music inspired by Middle-earth includes Johan de Meij's Symphony No. 1 "The Lord of the Rings" and Aulis Sallinen's Symphony No. 7 The Dreams of Gandalf. Among many works of popular music that reference Tolkien's works is the Led Zeppelin song "Ramble On", in which Gollum and the Dark Lord (Sauron) get up to some surprising things.

=== Games ===
The mythology's Orcs, Trolls, Dwarves, Elves, Wizards, and Hobbits (or Halflings) are firmly established in popular culture, such as in the tabletop role-playing game Dungeons & Dragons, and in Middle-earth video games.

== Fandom ==
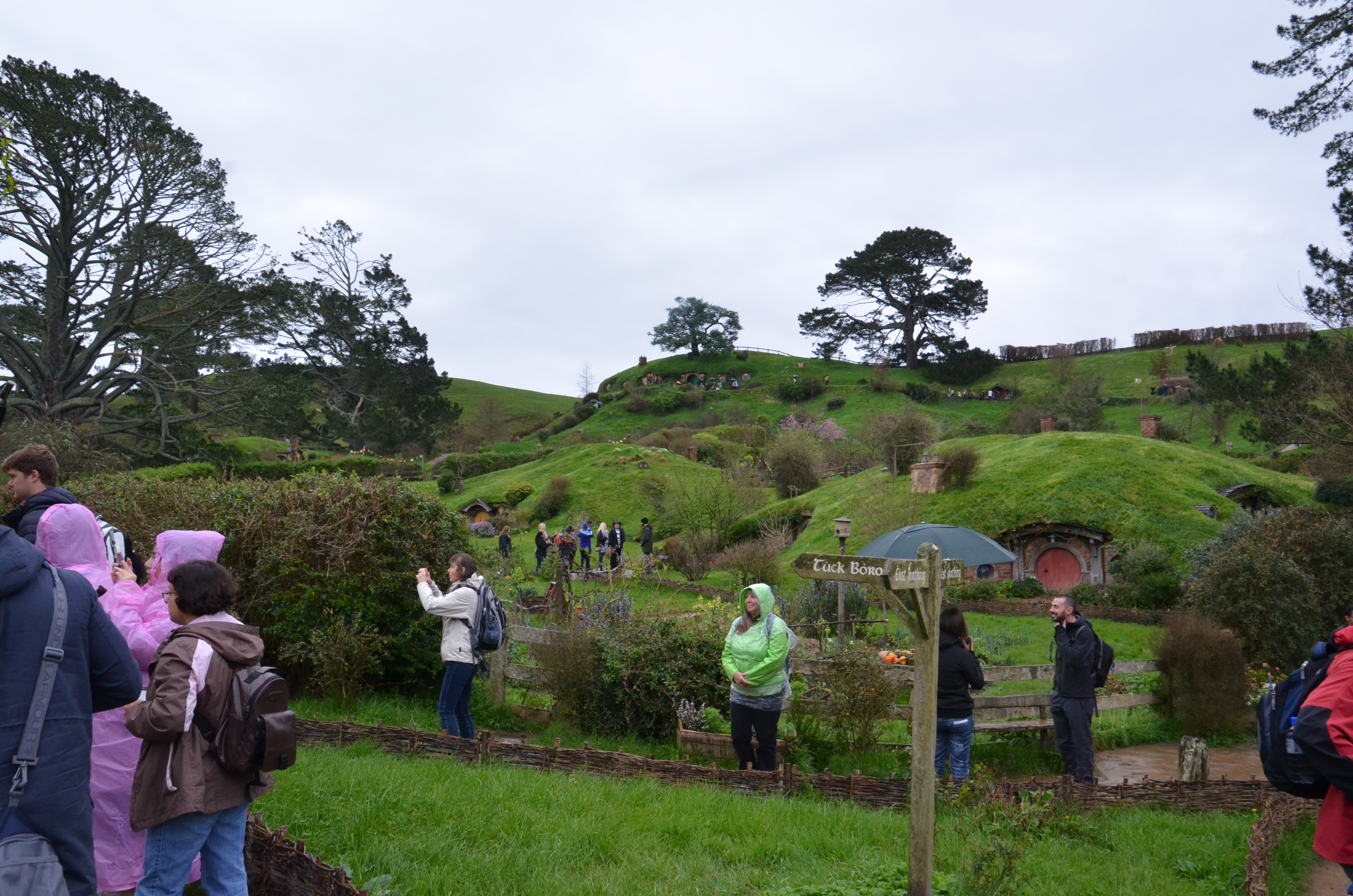
Tolkien tourists visiting the Hobbiton film set in New Zealand

Tolkien's books and Jackson's films have stimulated enormous Tolkien fandom activity in meetings such as Tolkienmoot, in Tolkien Societies in many countries, and on the Internet, with discussion groups, fan art, and many thousands of Tolkien fan fiction stories. Individual characters like Gollum have become familiar popular figures. Tolkien tourism has become commercially important, especially to some of Jackson's film locations in New Zealand, such as the Hobbiton film set.

=== Fan films ===
Tolkien fan films cannot be released commercially as the rights remain private, but some non-commercial films with small budgets and good production standards have been released on the Internet. These include Chris Bouchard's The Hunt for Gollum and Kate Madison's Born of Hope.

=== Fan art ===
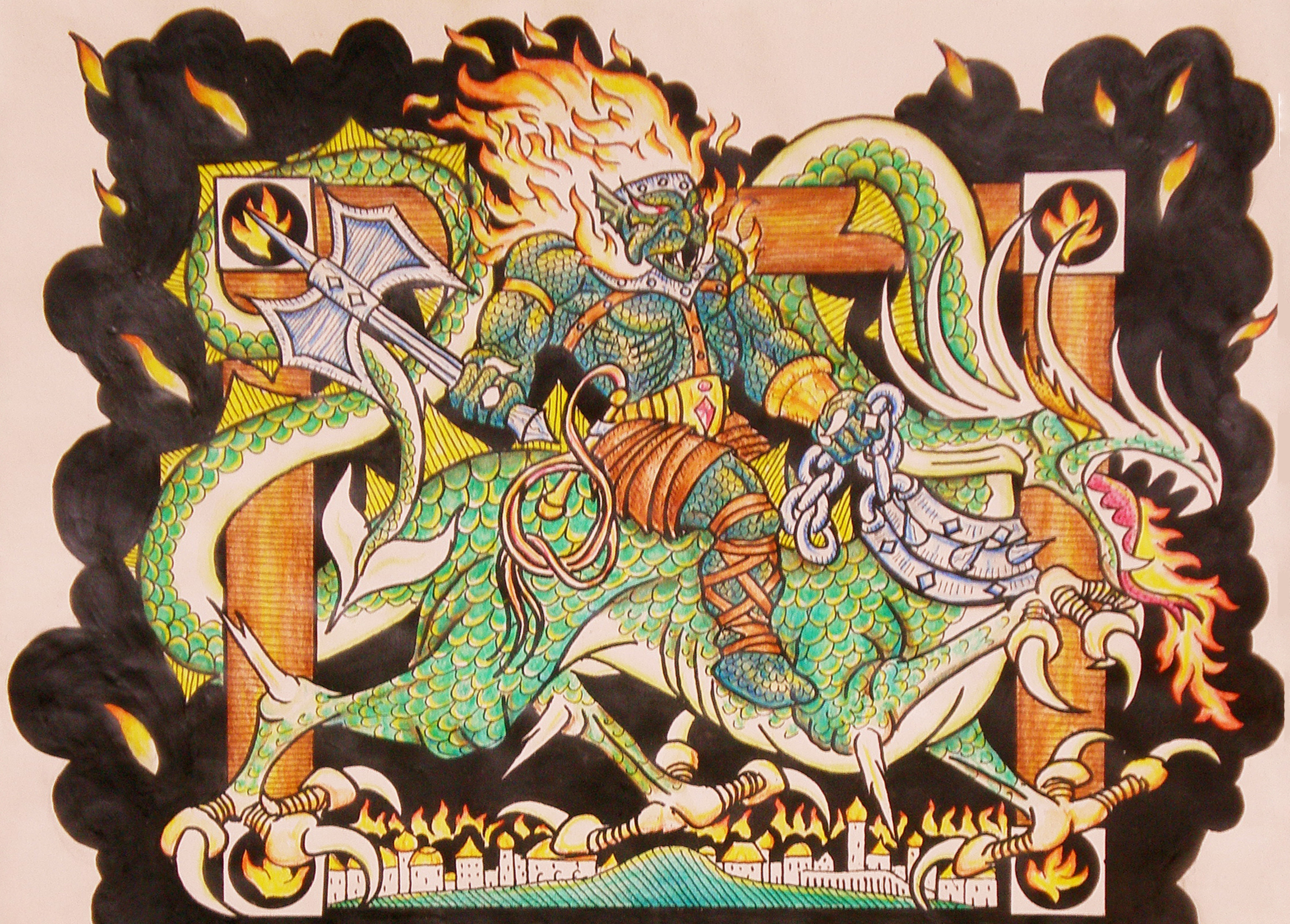
Gothmog, Lord of Balrogs, by Tom Loback

Tolkien fan art consists of Middle-earth-themed artworks created by fans, using any media, but usually shared online in digital form, typically on specialist websites. Fan art elicits abundant responses from other fans. Such responses can be grouped as praise; challenge and multi-person discussion of interpretation; discussion of (romantic) relationships; and references to Tolkien's original text, as authority. People involved in such discussions have nearly always read Tolkien's Middle-earth books. Artworks may feature well-known or minor characters, or may depict dramatic moments from Tolkien's stories.

=== Fan fiction ===
Tolkien fan fiction is fantasy writing by Tolkien fans, usually women, on some aspect of Middle-earth, often shared on the Internet; it exists in enormous quantities. It is based either on Tolkien's books or on a depiction of Middle-earth, especially Peter Jackson's films. Some authors seek to fill in gaps, such as events in the lives of characters before the main action described by Tolkien. Others write about the daily lives of minor characters; or they may invent characters in a suitable Middle-earth setting. The types of writing that have resulted include homoerotic slash fiction and several strands of feminist storytelling.

== Research ==
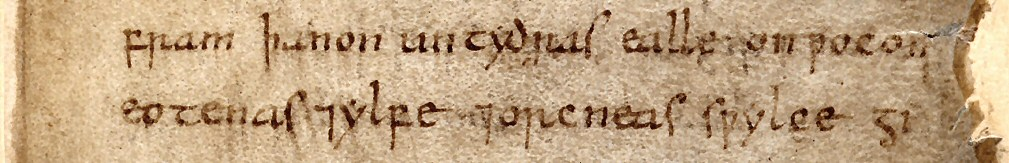
Beowulf's eotenas [ond] ylfe [ond] orcneas, "giants [and] elves [and] devil-corpses" inspired Tolkien's Elves and Orcs.

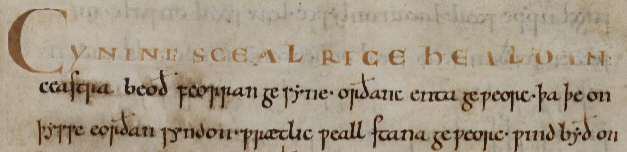
Maxims II's Orthanc enta geweorc, "skilful work of giants" inspired Orthanc and Ents.

Tolkien research has studied Tolkien's sources.

Much early literary comment on Tolkien's fantasy writings, especially The Lord of the Rings, was hostile. Other scholars, including Paul H. Kocher in 1972, Jane Chance in 1979, Tom Shippey in 1982, and Verlyn Flieger in 1983, began a process of rehabilitation, which has enabled the discipline of Tolkien studies to develop.

The scope of Tolkien research encompasses all aspects of his published novels, along with his legendarium that remained unpublished until after his death, and his constructed languages, especially the Elvish languages Quenya and Sindarin. Scholars from different disciplines have examined the linguistic and literary origins of Middle-earth, and have debated the themes of his writings from Christianity to feminism and race. Several journals specialise in the publication of Tolkien research.

== Popular culture ==
Out of Tolkien's writings, The Lord of the Rings in particular has had a profound and wide-ranging impact on popular culture, especially during the 1960s and 1970s when young people embraced it as a countercultural saga. The phrase "Frodo Lives!" became popular at that time. The words "Tolkienian" and "Tolkienesque" have entered the Oxford English Dictionary, and many of his fantasy terms, such as "Hobbit", "Orc", and "Warg", formerly little-known, have become widespread. Among its effects are numerous parodies, especially Harvard Lampoon's Bored of the Rings, which has had the distinction of remaining continuously in print from its publication in 1969, and of being translated into at least 11 languages. Outside commercial exploitation from adaptations, from the late 1960s onwards there has been an increasing variety of original licensed merchandise, with posters and calendars created by illustrators such as Barbara Remington. The Lord of the Rings was named Britain's best novel of all time in the BBC's The Big Read. In 2015, the BBC ranked it 26th on its list of the 100 greatest British novels. It was included in Le Monde's list of "100 Books of the Century".
