= Illustrating Middle-earth =

Depicting Tolkien's fictional world

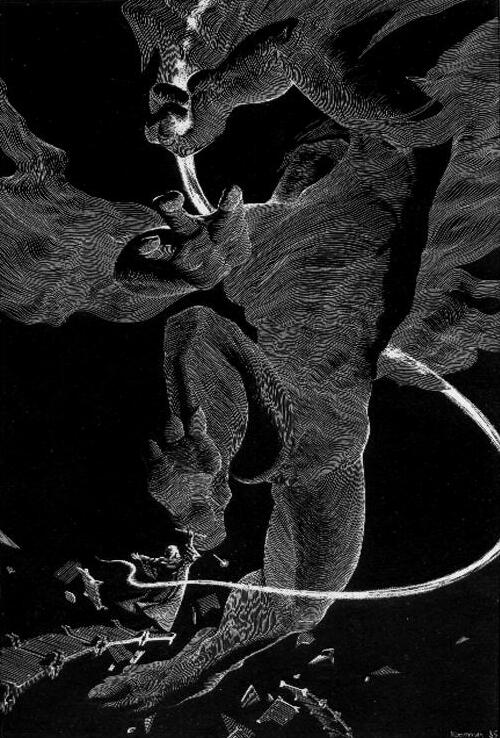
Gandalf fighting the Balrog on the bridge of Khazad-dûm. Scraperboard by Alexander Korotich, 1981

Since the publication of J. R. R. Tolkien's The Hobbit in 1937, artists including Tolkien himself have sought to capture aspects of Middle-earth fantasy novels in paintings and drawings. He was followed in his lifetime by artists whose work he liked, such as Pauline Baynes, Mary Fairburn, Queen Margrethe II of Denmark, and Ted Nasmith, and by some whose work he rejected, such as Horus Engels for the German edition of The Hobbit. Tolkien had strong views on illustration of fantasy, especially in the case of his own works. His recorded opinions range from his rejection of the use of images in his 1936 essay On Fairy-Stories, to agreeing the case for decorative images for certain purposes, and his actual creation of images to accompany the text in The Hobbit and The Lord of the Rings. Commentators including Ruth Lacon and Pieter Collier have described his views on illustration as contradictory, and his requirements as being as fastidious as his editing of his novels.

After Tolkien's death in 1973, many artists have created illustrations of Middle-earth characters and landscapes, in media ranging from Alexander Korotich's scraperboard depictions to Margrethe II of Denmark's woodcut-style drawings, Sergey Yuhimov's Russian Orthodox icon-style representations, and Donato Giancola's neoclassical oil paintings. Peter Jackson's 2001–2003 film trilogy of The Lord of the Rings made use of concept art by John Howe and Alan Lee; the resulting images of Middle-earth and the story's characters have strongly influenced subsequent representations of Tolkien's work. Jenny Dolfen has specialised in making watercolour paintings of The Silmarillion, winning three awards from The Tolkien Society. Graham A. Judd has illustrated his father's book on the Flora of Middle-earth with woodcuts showing both the flowers and the scenes associated with them in the legendarium.

== Tolkien's artwork ==
J. R. R. Tolkien accompanied his Middle-earth fantasy writings with a wide variety of non-narrative materials, including paintings and drawings, calligraphy, and maps. In his lifetime, some of his artworks were included in his novels The Hobbit and The Lord of the Rings; others were used on the covers of different editions of these books, and later on the cover of The Silmarillion. (Note: Tolkien 1977, Front and back cover) Posthumously, collections of his artworks have been published, and academics have begun to evaluate him as an artist as well as an author.

== Tolkien's views on illustration ==
Tolkien held strong opinions on illustrating fantasy, especially of his own works, but his statements made at different times are not easy to reconcile into a single point of view.

=== Destroy useful ambiguity ===
In his 1936 essay On Fairy-Stories, Tolkien wrote that "However good in themselves, illustrations do little good to fairy-stories." (Note: Tolkien 1983, "On Fairy-Stories", Note E.) He argued that by giving somewhat generic descriptions in words, the author leaves freedom for the reader's imagination. The Tolkien scholar Nils Agøy suggests that in The Lord of the Rings, Tolkien makes frequent use of ambiguity for exactly this reason. Tolkien's illustrations for The Hobbit provide, in the words of the Tolkien scholars Wayne Hammond and Christina Scull, "backgrounds on which readers can paint their own mental pictures, directed by a text but not constrained by too specific an image".

=== Could work if well-drawn ===
The 1938 American edition of The Hobbit was illustrated with five of Tolkien's own watercolour paintings. Tolkien was at that time willing to have images in the actual text of the novel, illustrating specific episodes of the narrative. He commented in a 1938 letter to his American publishers, Houghton Mifflin, who were looking for illustrations for their forthcoming edition of The Hobbit, that they should seek an artist "who can draw [human figures]" as his own drawings of hobbits were "an unsafe guide", some of them "very ill-drawn". (Note: Carpenter 2023, #27 to Houghton Mifflin, c. March or April 1938) (Note: One of Tolkien's drawings of hobbits is in the Bilbo Baggins article.) He mentions, too, that there could be "special illustrations of episodes" in the story where the hobbit Bilbo might appear wearing boots, which he says Bilbo acquired in Rivendell, but in the other illustrations he should be drawn with bare feet.

=== Must be in keeping with the text ===
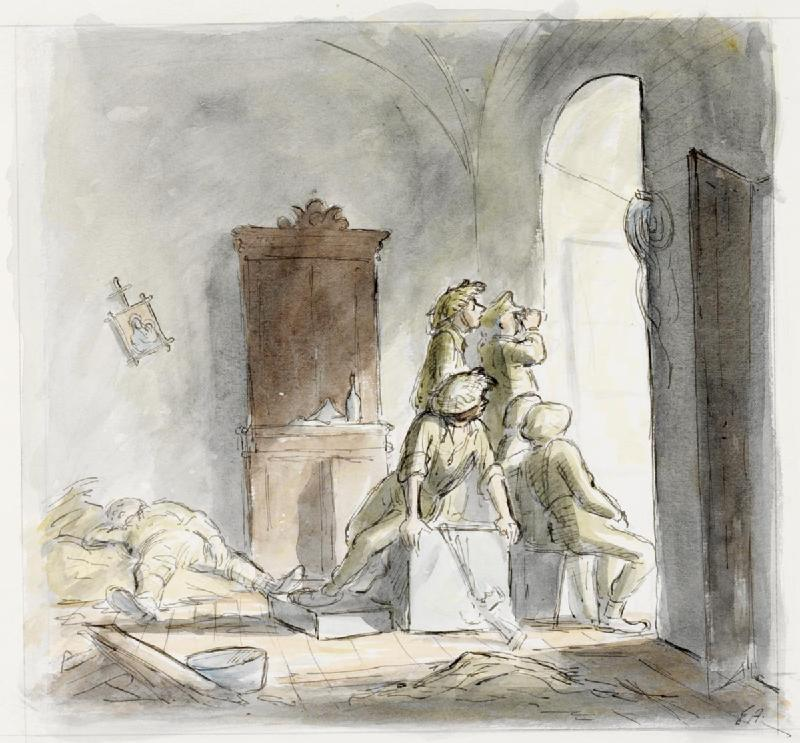
Tolkien thought that Milein Cosman's illustrations unhelpfully resembled the fashionable Edward Ardizzone's work (example pictured). (Note: Carpenter 2023, #116 to Allen & Unwin, 5 August 1948)

In 1946, Tolkien voiced his objections to Horus Engels's illustrations for a German edition of The Hobbit. He described the work as having "certain merits", but "too 'Disnified' for my taste: Bilbo with a dribbling nose, and Gandalf as a figure of vulgar fun rather than the Odinic wanderer that I think of". (Note: Carpenter 2023, #107 to Sir Stanley Unwin, 7 December 1946) (Note: The image can be seen in the Horus Engels article.)

Tolkien felt that the requirements of a good illustration were not the same as for being a respected or fashionable artist. When Allen & Unwin were working with the artist Milein Cosman on illustrations for Farmer Giles of Ham in 1948, Tolkien described the sample drawings as resembling the work of Feliks Topolski or Edward Ardizzone, commenting that he wasn't "much interested in [their] fashionableness". That did not make up, in his opinion, for "their lack of resemblance to their text". He stated, among more detailed objections, that the artist should have located the illustrations in or near Oxfordshire; that the trees were poorly drawn; and that the dragon was "absurd. Ridiculously coy, and quite incapable of performing any of the tasks laid on him by the author." In short, he found Cosman's samples "wholly out of keeping with the style or manner of the text".

By 1949, Allen & Unwin had found another artist to illustrate Farmer Giles of Ham, Pauline Baynes. Tolkien expressed delight at the result, writing that the images were "more than illustrations, they are a collateral theme". He noted his friends' "polite" comment, that "they reduced my text to a commentary on the drawings." (Note: Carpenter 2023, #120 to Allen & Unwin, 16 March 1949)

=== Should "depict the noble and the heroic" ===
Tolkien met the Dutch artist Cor Blok in 1961. He liked the five paintings that he saw enough to purchase two of them. "Battle of the Hornburg II" hung in the front hall of his house to welcome visitors. "The Dead Marshes" too found a place in his house; Blok later gave Tolkien a third painting, "Dunharrow", out of his 149 The Lord of the Rings works. Tolkien wrote to his publisher, Rayner Unwin, that he found Blok's paintings "most attractive", especially the Hornburg image. He thought the other works "attractive as pictures but bad as illustrations"; he doubted whether any living "artist of talent ... would even try to depict the noble and the heroic", elements that he felt central to his work. All the same, when asked in December 1962 who might be able to illustrate a deluxe edition of The Lord of the Rings (as a set of six volumes), Tolkien proposed Blok and Pauline Baynes. Blok added in 2011 that the 20th century had created two stereotypes of "the noble and the heroic": totalitarian hero-figures such as the "Heroes of Labour" of Stalinist Art, or the "bulging muscles (and breasts)" of the superheroes of comic books. He commented that neither are suitable for illustrating Tolkien, and that the two approaches had made it hard for artists of other sorts to represent heroism, even on "a small scale". The Tolkien scholar Daniel Howick especially admired Blok's "wonderfully atmospheric" painting "Rivendell".

Detail of Cor Blok's painting Battle of the Hornburg II that Tolkien liked enough to purchase. It was the only one of Blok's Middle-earth images that worked for Tolkien as an illustration, as opposed to a stand-alone painting.

=== Should leave freedom for imagination ===
Tolkien told Blok that "he was not in favour of illustrated editions". However, they agreed that an illustrator should omit anything non-essential from an image. In a letter to Baynes, who had by then illustrated several of his minor works, Tolkien similarly mentioned his objections to illustration, but stated that a case could be made for "illustration (or decoration!) applied to small things". (Note: Carpenter 2023, #235 to Pauline Baynes, 6 December 1961) Agøy comments that Tolkien's remarks to these artists are "not unambiguous", but taken together suggest that he believed that freedom should be left for the reader.

=== Contradictory opinions ===
The artist Ruth Lacon argues that Tolkien's actions, preparing illustrations for his own works, conflict with what he wrote about their use. She suggests that images are especially useful in complex texts like The Silmarillion. Pieter Collier, who edited a book of Cor Blok's illustrations for The Lord of the Rings, commented that "Tolkien's criteria for excellence in illustration were as fastidious" as those for selecting "le mot juste in his writing." The scholar of literature Aurore Noury comments that one of the paradoxes around Tolkien is that he hoped his subcreated world would live on after him, but that he imposed strict requirements on anyone who sought to illustrate his novels.

Some of Tolkien's views on illustration
| Style | Application | Example artists |
|---|---|---|
| Inaccurate failing to match text, tone wrong | Unusable | Horus Engels; Milein Cosman |
| Decorative attractive but without heroic tone | Minor (non-Middle-earth) tales, vistas, maps | Pauline Baynes; Tolkien's own artwork |
| Illustrative with "noble or awe-inspiring" quality | In or alongside the text | Margrethe II of Denmark; Mary Fairburn |

== In dialogue with Tolkien: 1937–1973 ==
=== Tove Jansson, 1962 ===
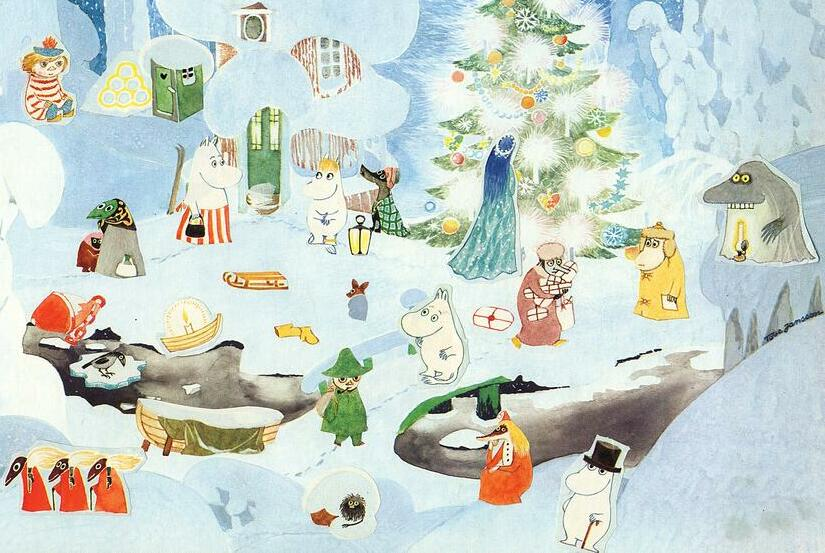
Tove Jansson is better known for her Moomin characters.

The Swedish-speaking Finnish author, novelist, painter and illustrator Tove Jansson, who had written and illustrated the Moomin books, illustrated Swedish and Finnish translations of The Hobbit. Among these is a very large Gollum for the 1962 Swedish translation; she had been asked to do the illustrations by the Swedish children's author, Astrid Lindgren. Jansson wanted to avoid any hint of Moomins, but equally did not try to enter the world of Middle-earth, being more interested in the landscapes, writing "The characters are commonplace: dwarfs, goblins, elves, black demigods – but the scenery is seductive in its macabre ferocity." Tolkien was surprised to see a giant monster towering above Bilbo, but realised that the book did not say how small Gollum was. (Note: The image can be seen in the Gollum article.) He edited the second edition to state explicitly that Gollum was "a small, slimy creature".

The scholar of literature Björn Sundmark states that Jansson's work helped to define how Middle-earth fantasy could be depicted visually. He adds that the edition with her illustrations was not reprinted for many years, (Note: It was reprinted in the same 24 cm format in 1994 by Rabén Prisma, ISBN 978-9-15182-727-8.) even though reviewers and "Tolkienists" liked Jansson's "expressive" (Note: Jansson's "expressive" illustration of the dragon Smaug destroying Lake-Town is shown in the Tove Jansson article.) images. Sundmark suggests that the reason was that in the 1960s, a new, more realistic style became the norm for fantasy art.

=== Mary Fairburn, 1968 ===
In May 1968, the English artist Mary Fairburn sent Tolkien several illustrations of The Lord of the Rings, mostly in coloured ink. He replied that they were "splendid. They are better pictures in themselves and also show far more attention to the text than any that have yet been submitted to me". He added "I am beginning to ... think that an illustrated edition [of The Lord of the Rings] might be a good thing."

The project went no further, as Tolkien, aged 76, injured his leg and was in the process of moving house from Oxford to Bournemouth; and the removals team seriously disorganised his papers. In October 1968 he wrote to Fairburn that his publisher Rayner Unwin would take "some months" to decide whether to publish an illustrated edition of The Lord of the Rings, mentioning that black-and-white illustrations were more likely. She states that she created black-and-white versions of 26 of her paintings, one for each chapter of The Fellowship of the Ring and the first four chapters of The Two Towers, the last being "Treebeard". Fairburn lost many of the illustrations in repeated house moves; nine survive, (Note: The surviving images are The Old Forest; The Inn at Bree; The Pass on Mount Caradhras; The Bridge at Khazad-dûm; Galadriel at the Well in Lórien; The Great River; Treebeard with Pippin and Merry; Gandalf on the Tower of Orthanc; and The Dead Marshes, also called Sam and Frodo in Mordor with a Nazgûl. The image of Gollum that she had sent to Tolkien (and which he returned with the other samples) is lost.) of which one, a coloured painting of "Galadriel at the Well in Lórien" came into Tolkien's possession. Fairburn's illustrations remained unknown to scholars until 2012; her work was finally published in the Tolkien Calendar 2015.

Detail of The Pass on Mount Caradhras, Mary Fairburn's 1968 image for "The Ring Goes South". (Note: "The Ring Goes South" is a chapter in The Fellowship of the Ring, namely book 2, chapter 3.) Tolkien called her work "splendid", liking it enough to think of an illustrated The Lord of the Rings.

=== Pauline Baynes ===
Pauline Baynes created the illustrations for some of Tolkien's minor works, such as the 1949 Farmer Giles of Ham and the 1962 The Adventures of Tom Bombadil. In 1969, Tolkien's publisher Allen & Unwin commissioned her to paint "A Map of Middle-earth". Tolkien supplied her with copies of his draft maps for The Lord of the Rings, and annotated her copy of his son Christopher's 1954 map for The Fellowship of the Ring. Allen & Unwin published Baynes's map as a poster in 1970. It was decorated with a header and footer showing some of Tolkien's characters, and vignettes of some of his stories' locations. The poster map became "iconic" of Middle-earth.

The scholar of English literature Paul Tankard comments that "Tolkien clearly admired Pauline Baynes' work, in certain ways and for certain purposes: for illustrations to his slighter and non-Middle-earthly tales, for vistas and for maps—but not for inside and alongside of the narrative of The Lord of the Rings." In short, Tolkien liked her work and found it usefully decorative, but felt that it lacked the "noble or awe-inspiring" quality that Middle-earth illustrations needed, giving as an instance "her ridiculous picture of the dragon" in Farmer Giles of Ham.

Tolkien liked Pauline Baynes's decorative illustrations for his minor works such as Farmer Giles of Ham, but thought her style unsuitable for use inside his major fantasy works, as it was not "noble or awe-inspiring"; he found her dragon (pictured) "ridiculous".

=== Margrethe II of Denmark ===
Princess Margrethe (later Queen Margrethe II of Denmark), an accomplished and critically acclaimed painter, was inspired to create illustrations to The Lord of the Rings in the early 1970s. Tolkien liked her woodcut-style drawings, seeing in them a resemblance to the style of some of his own artwork. In 1977, Margrethe's drawings were published in the Danish translation of the book, redrawn by the British artist Eric Fraser. (Note: Tolkien 1977, Title page of The Folio Society edition)

Woodcut-style illustration of Éowyn fighting the Nazgul's fell beast at the Battle of the Pelennor Fields, by Margrethe II of Denmark. Tolkien liked her work, seeing in it a style resembling his own.

=== Ted Nasmith ===
While still in high school, Ted Nasmith painted some illustrations for The Hobbit, and in 1972 mailed photographs of a selection of his artworks to Tolkien, including a gouache of The Unexpected Party at the start of The Hobbit. (Note: The image can be seen in the Ted Nasmith article.) Tolkien responded by letter a few weeks later, both praising the work and commenting that the rendition of Bilbo Baggins seemed a little too childlike. This encouraged Nasmith to strive for a more literal interpretation of Tolkien's works. He later created the illustrations for some editions of The Silmarillion.

Ted Nasmith's first attempt at illustrating Tolkien, his 1972 gouache painting The Unexpected Party, depicting a scene from the start of The Hobbit. He sent the picture to Tolkien, who praised the work but called the Bilbo rendering too childlike.

== Independent views ==
=== A Japanese view, 1965 ===
The Japanese artist Ryûichi Terashima (寺島竜一) made a set of drawings to illustrate Teiji Seta's 1965 translation of The Hobbit. Robert Ellwood, writing in Mythlore, admired the work, with the characters treated "with the seriousness to which the epic dimensions of Tolkien's work entitles them." In his view, the characters "emerge in these sensitive line drawings as real, discrete personalities".

Ryûichi Terashima's drawing of Gandalf and Bilbo at Bag End. His representations of these characters has been praised for making them "real, discrete personalities".

=== An unrealised Maurice Sendak set, 1967 ===
The children's book author Maurice Sendak was invited to illustrate a deluxe edition of The Hobbit in 1967. He created one surviving sample drawing, of Gandalf with Bilbo smoking outside Bag End. According to the artist Tony DiTerlizzi in the Los Angeles Times, Sendak sent two drawings to Tolkien, the one that survives and one of Mirkwood's wood-elves dancing by moonlight. DiTerlizzi finds the work subtle and masterly, with "heavy crosshatching used to weigh down a world-weary Gandalf contrasted with the open, airy line work that renders the jovial Bilbo." In DiTerlizzi's version of events, the editor accidentally labelled Sendak's wood-elves as "hobbits", which annoyed Tolkien, and he rejected the drawings, angering Sendak. A meeting was arranged to resolve the matter, but Sendak had a heart attack and the publisher cancelled the project. DiTerlizzi offers another possible explanation, namely that Tolkien did not want The Hobbit to be thought of as a children's story. (Note: DiTerlizzi notes that in 1959, Tolkien wrote in a letter "I am not specially interested in children, and certainly not in writing for them." (Note: Carpenter 2023, #215 to Walter Allen, New Statesman, April 1959))

Drawing by Maurice Sendak of Gandalf and Bilbo at Bag End, 1967. The contrasting treatment of the two characters has been described as subtle and masterly.

=== Through Slavic eyes, 1976 onwards ===
Soviet era Russian illustrations of The Hobbit were according to Open Culture "traditionally stylized ... angular, friendlier, almost cartoonish". In the art historian Joel Merriner's view, the artists presented a distinctively non-Anglocentric vision of Middle-earth. Mikhail Belomlinsky's (Беломлинский, Михаил Самуилович) illustrations for Natalya Rakhmanova's (Рахманова, Наталия Леонидовна) 1976 translation include the three Trolls with full beards, dark clothes, and bare feet, holding tankards and arguing over how to cook Bilbo. The Hobbit is shown with hairy legs, as in other Russian illustrations, rather than just hairy feet; the Russian word нога ("noga") can mean either "leg" or "foot". Belomlinsky stated that his Bilbo character was based on the actor Yevgeny Leonov, who he described as "good-natured, plump, with hairy legs."

Mikhail Belomlinsky's somewhat cartoonish Soviet-era Russian illustration of the three Trolls arguing over how to cook Bilbo, 1976

In 1981, the Russian artist Alexander Korotich, known for his "Zuza" series of fairy tales, made a series of scraperboard engravings of The Lord of the Rings. Many were lost; those that survived were eventually exhibited in 2013.

Scraperboard illustrations by Alexander Korotich

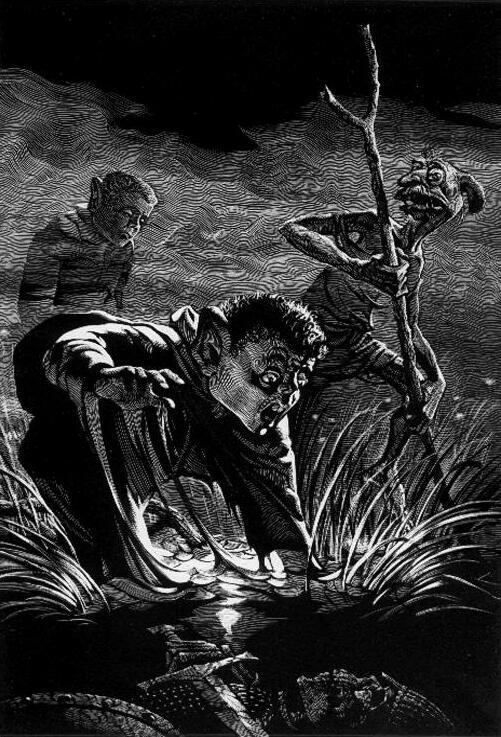
Frodo and Sam guided by Gollum through the Dead Marshes

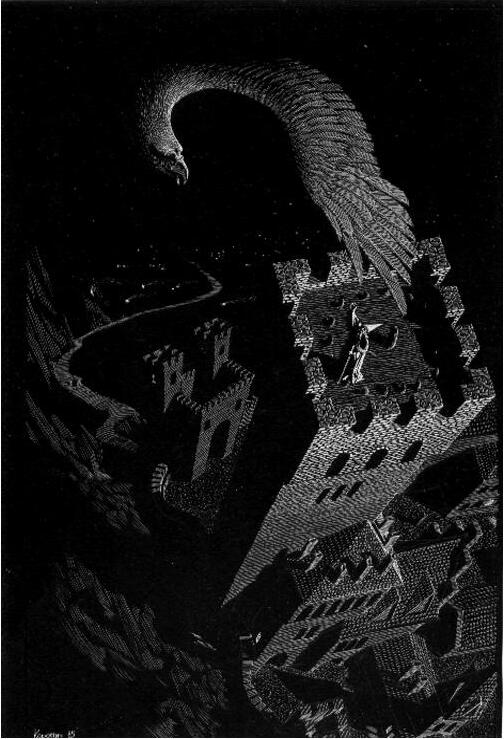
Gwaihir the Eagle rescues Gandalf from Orthanc

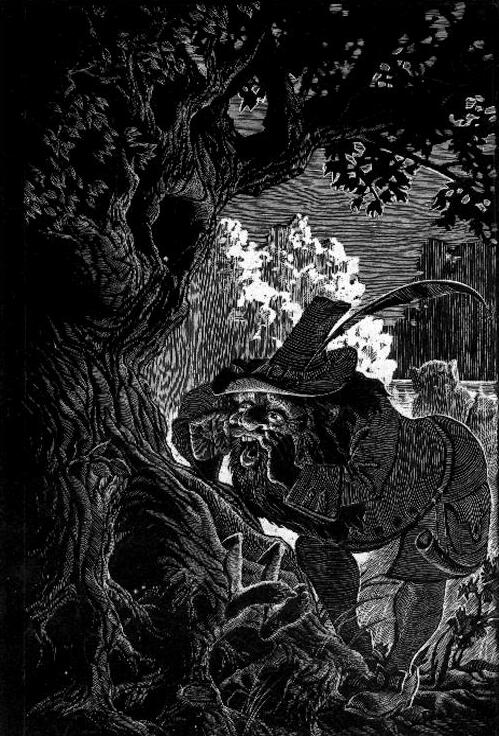
Tom Bombadil frees the Hobbits from Old Man Willow

In 1979, the Czech artist and animator Jiří Šalamoun, known for his children's television series Maxipes Fík starring a cartoon dog, illustrated Frantisek Vrba's translation of The Hobbit. Šalamoun adapted his usual children's style to what he thought would suit the book; Janka Kaščáková comments that the result is "rather far ... from Tolkien's original."

Detail of Jiří Šalamoun's rather wayward illustration of An Unexpected Party for the 1979 Czech translation of The Hobbit.

The Ukrainian artist Sergey Yuhimov (Сергей Юхимов, Sergei Iukhimov) illustrated a 1993 edition of The Lord of the Rings in the style of the icons of the Russian Orthodox Church. This use of symbolism may have added layers of meaning to those already intended by Tolkien. Open Culture has described the work as "vivid, stylistically Medieval, religious-icon-saturated".

Sergey Yuhimov illustrated a 1993 Russian translation of The Lord of the Rings in the style of the icons of the Russian Orthodox Church.

=== Covers and calendars, 1978 onwards ===
Paul R. Gregory's Middle-earth paintings, created from 1978 onwards, have appeared on the covers of some 30 rock music albums; the artist Ruth Lacon has however described Gregory's work as inaccurate, departing from Tolkien's text. Tim and Greg Hildebrandt, usually called the Brothers Hildebrandt, were known especially for their Tolkien Calendars, which appeared between 1976 and 2006. (Note: The 1976 calendar is illustrated in the Brothers Hildebrandt article.) The illustrator John Howe said he got "a real spark" from the Hildebrandts' calendars, as they showed him that Tolkien's novels could be illustrated.

=== Calligraphy and illumination, 1990 ===
Tom Loback contributed to the appreciation of Tolkien's legendarium both through his artwork and with scholarly study. The Tolkien scholar Bradford Lee Eden commented that Loback's work was "unique" in featuring both Tolkien's scripts (Cirth and Tengwar) and Elvish languages (Quenya and Sindarin) in his art, and in his imitation of the style of medieval illuminated manuscripts. His artistic vision of The Silmarillion has been celebrated alongside that of other Tolkien illustrators: in 1990, Mythlore set Loback and three others the task of illustrating the confrontation between the maker of the Silmarils, Fëanor, and his half-brother Fingolfin.

Medieval-style Silmarillion images with Elvish calligraphy by Tom Loback

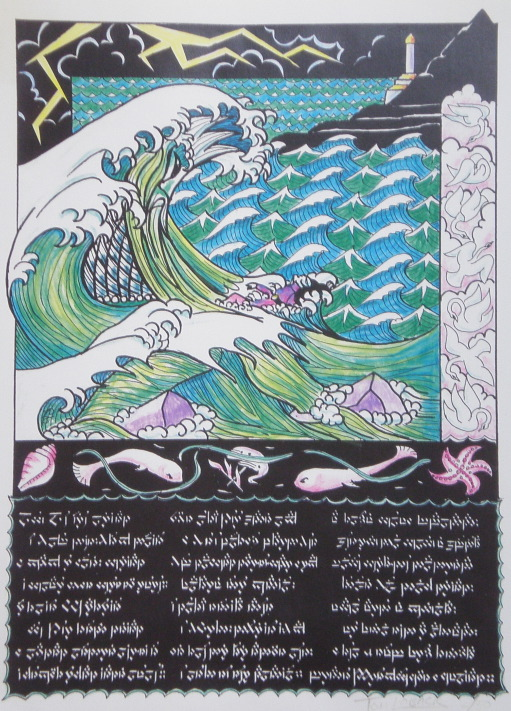
Ulmo, Lord of Waters, saves Voronwë.

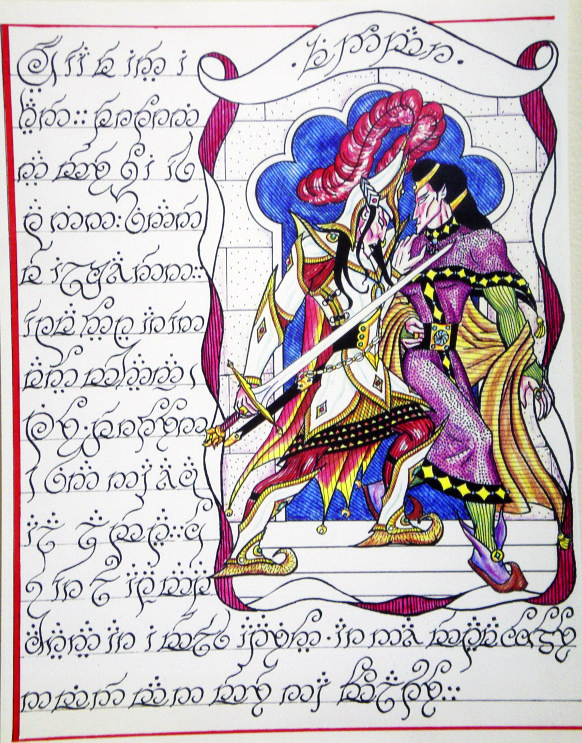
Fëanor, maker of the Silmarils, confronts his half-brother Fingolfin.

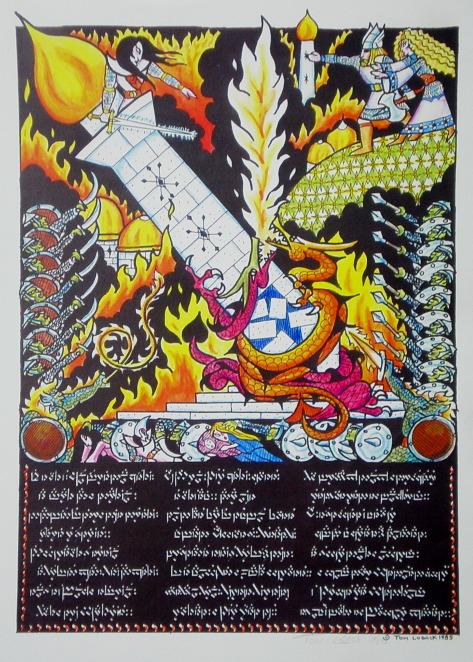
The Fall of Turgon's Tower during the Fall of Gondolin

=== Fantasy and botany, 2017 ===
Tolkien stated that he had a "special fascination" for illustrated botany books, and for the "unfamiliar flora[s]" of new areas. He said he had not seen anything quite like Niphredil, because "those imagined flowers are lit by a light" of another world; the flower would be "simply a delicate kin of a snowdrop". (Note: Carpenter 2023, #312 to Amy Ronald, 16 November 1969) The illustrator Graham A. Judd has prepared woodcut illustrations to support his father, the botanist Walter S. Judd's 2017 Flora of Middle-earth. According to the Tolkien scholar Martin Simonson, the woodcuts "combine accurate representations of the morphological features of most of the plants under study with symbolically rendered scenes from the legendarium, and they thus manage to convey the mixed essence of the book as such: art and science."

Detail of woodcut illustration of the fictional Niphredil flower, based on a snowdrop. The inset vignette shows Aragorn and Arwen on a lawn of the flowers on Cerin Amroth. From the 2017 Flora of Middle-earth, by Graham A. Judd. The image combines fantasy and botany, "art and science".

=== Classical realism, 2019 ===
The American artist Donato Giancola describes himself as "classical-abstract-realist working with science fiction and fantasy". His many paintings of J. R. R. Tolkien's fantasy world have led Jeff LaSala, writing on Tor.com, to label him "the Caravaggio of Middle-earth" and a "Tolkien neoclassicist". LaSala suggests that Giancola's "The Tower of Cirith Ungol", with an Orc tormenting a naked Frodo, could almost be by the Anglo-Swiss artist Henry Fuseli (1741–1825), known for his depictions of the supernatural.

Donato Giancola's neoclassical painting The Tower of Cirith Ungol has been likened to the dramatic works
of Caravaggio or Henry Fuseli.

== The effect of Peter Jackson's film trilogy: 2001–2003 and after ==
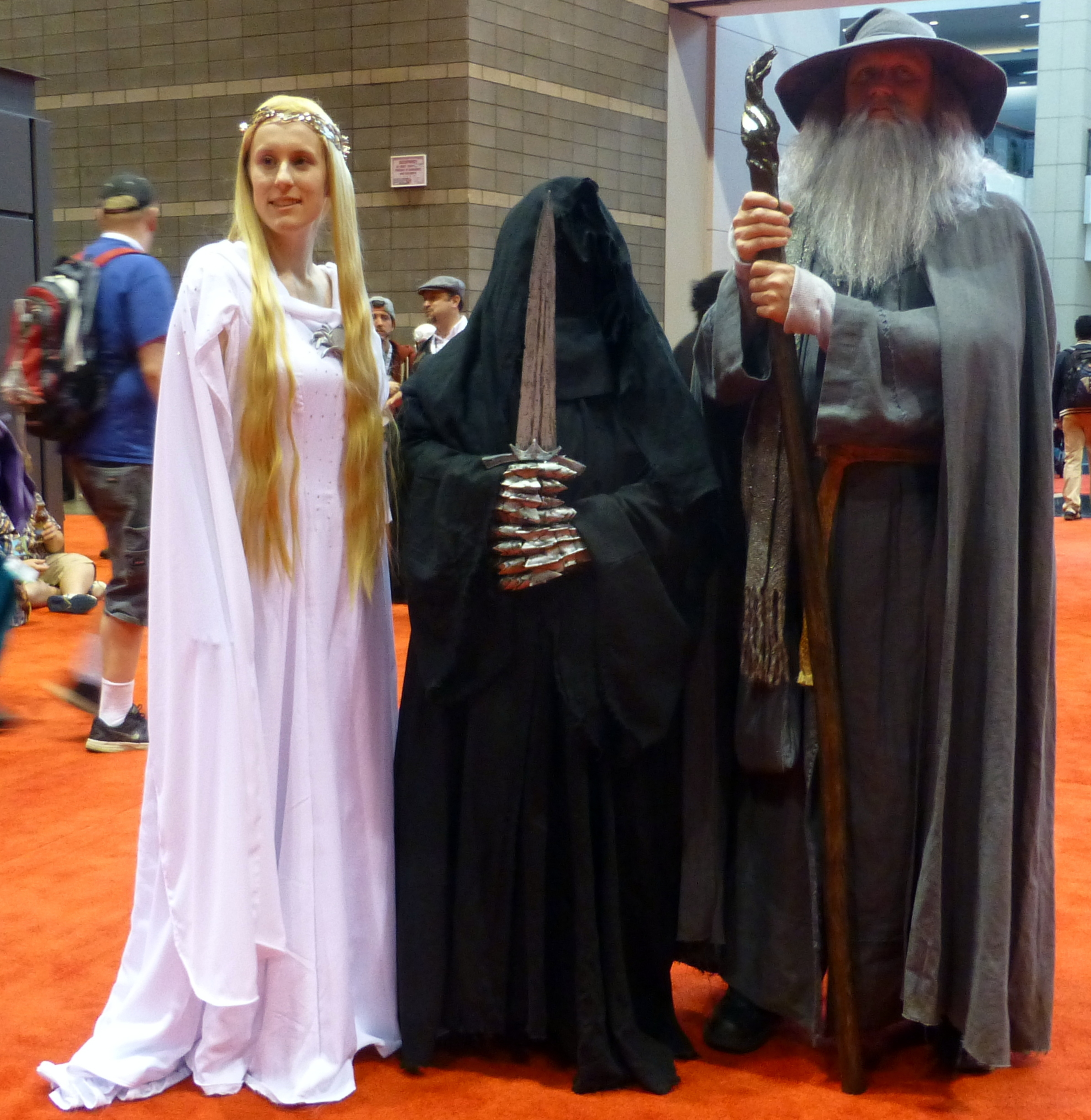
Peter Jackson's films of The Lord of the Rings created stereotypes of Middle-earth and its peoples, shared by Tolkien fans and artists alike. (Note: The cosplay fans illustrated are dressed as the Elf Galadriel, a Nazgul, and the Wizard Gandalf.)

=== Concept art ===
The Tolkien illustrators John Howe and Alan Lee became well known by the end of the 20th century for their Middle-earth artwork – Lee for illustrated editions of The Hobbit and The Lord of the Rings, and Howe for the cover artwork to several Tolkien publications. Both men worked as concept artists in the creation of Peter Jackson's 2001–2003 The Lord of the Rings film trilogy, their designs leading directly to those in the films. (Note: Lee's Orthanc image is illustrated in that article.) In 2004, Lee won an Academy Award for Best Art Direction on the film The Lord of the Rings: The Return of the King. Nasmith had been invited to work as a concept artist for Peter Jackson's films but he had declined.

Hans Velten suggests that both Tolkien and Lee were influenced by the visual style of the Arts and Crafts pioneer William Morris, given that Tolkien admired Morris's writing and artwork. Accordingly, Lee adapted the style of his Middle-earth illustrations to be more like Morris's work. Through Jackson's films, that brought Morris's style to a wider modern fantasy audience.

=== From fan art to recognised artistry ===
The films attracted a large audience, making the artistic conception of Jackson's artists influential, indeed creating a stereotyped image of Middle-earth and its races of Elves, Dwarves, Orcs and Hobbits shared by Tolkien fans and artists alike. Some fan artists however draw inspiration from other sources; Anna Kulisz acknowledges that her painting of Arwen sewing Aragorn's banner was inspired by Edmund Leighton's 1911 painting Stitching the Standard.

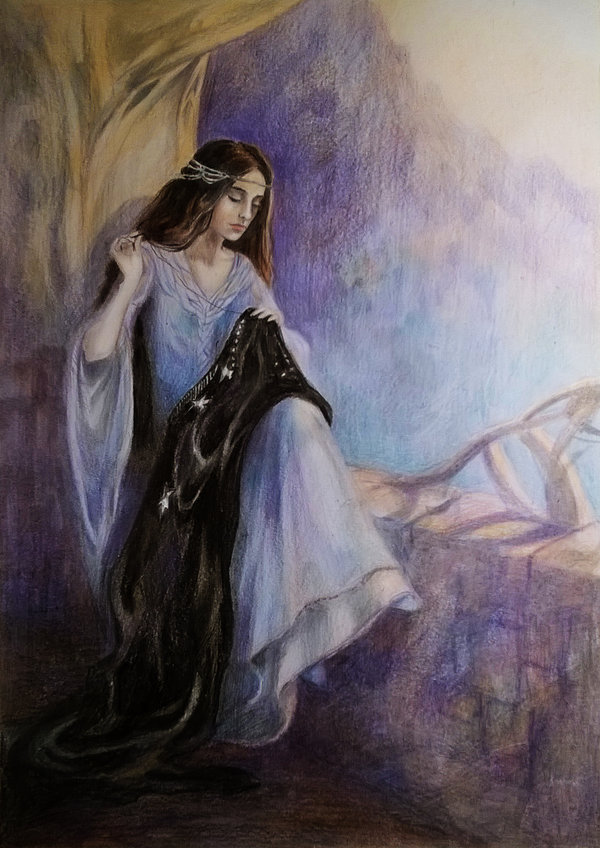
Arwen sewing Aragorn's banner, by Anna Kulisz, 2015

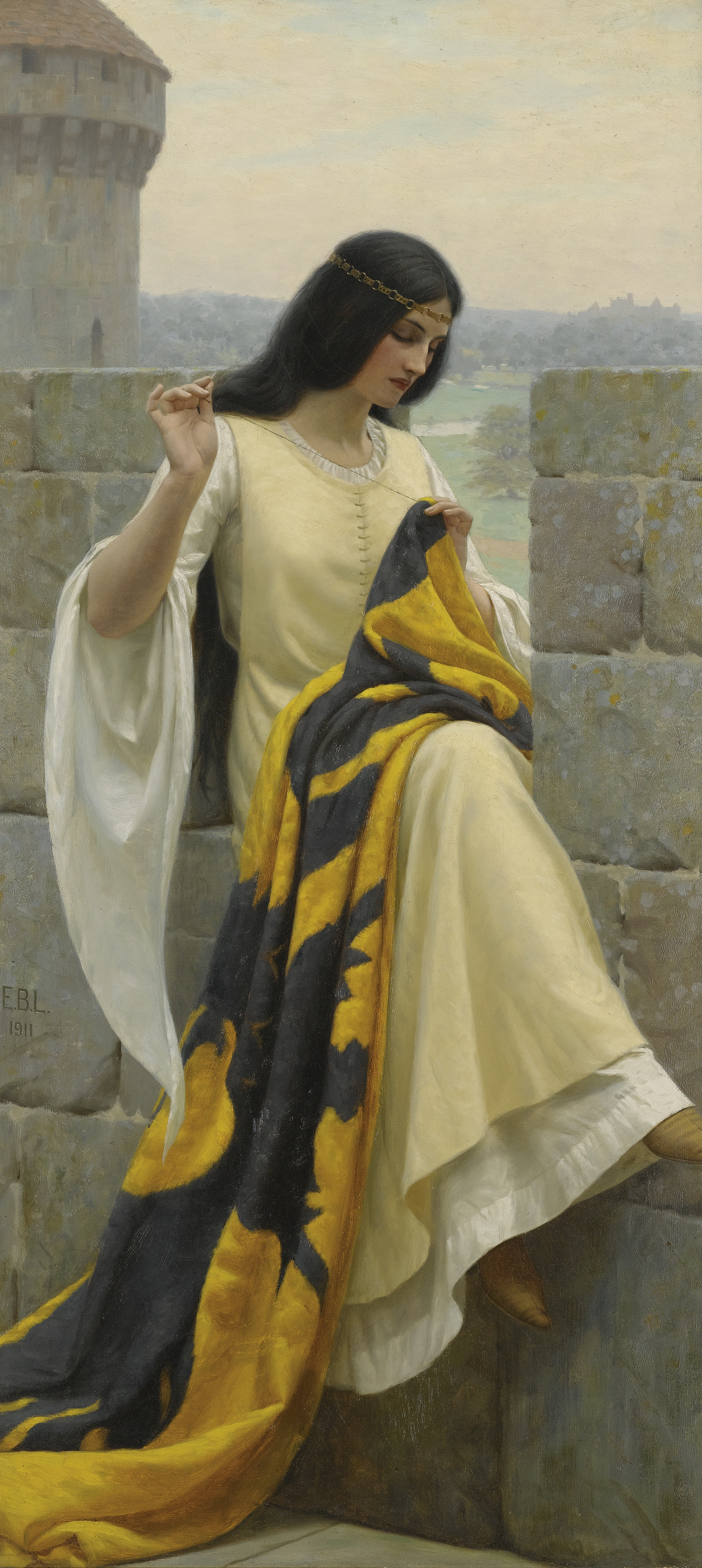
Stitching the Standard, by Edmund Leighton, 1911

The German illustrator Anke Eißmann had already become known for her Tolkien artwork, starting out as fan art, such as for the German Tolkien Society's Der Flammifer von Westernis from 1991. She made numerous paintings of scenes from The Silmarillion. Eißmann illustrated Timothy Furnish's 2016 book High Towers and Strong Places: A Political History of Middle-earth in a way that, in Mike Foster's opinion, had been influenced by Peter Jackson's films.

Anke Eißmann's painting The Parting (of Beren from Lúthien), as narrated in The Silmarillion. Her work has been described as influenced by Peter Jackson's films.

Jenny Dolfen has made a series of watercolour paintings of scenes from The Silmarillion. She has been described as the best-known of the many self-taught Middle-earth artists; Aurore Noury comments that her fame among Tolkien fans has given her a hybrid status, being both a self-taught fan artist and a recognised and published artist. Dolfen has won three awards from The Tolkien Society for her paintings, namely in 2014 for "Eärendil the Mariner", a painting of Eärendil, a character from the first beginnings of Tolkien's legendarium; (Note: The painting can be seen in the Jenny Dolfen article.) in 2018 for "The Hunt", a depiction of Finrod Felagund going on a hunt with the Fëanoreans Maedhros and Maglor in Eastern Beleriand; and in 2020 the T-shirt design "The Professor", celebrating 50 years of The Tolkien Society, with Middle-earth characters and places within the outline of a pipe-smoking J. R. R. Tolkien.

== See also ==
- The Annotated Hobbit, including numerous covers and illustrations from translations of The Hobbit
- Inger Edelfeldt, who made numerous cover illustrations for Swedish editions of Tolkien's books
- List of things named after J. R. R. Tolkien and his works, including astronomical objects, companies, genes, ships, places, and species
- Middle-earth in motion pictures, including animated films of Tolkien's books
- Works inspired by J. R. R. Tolkien, including films, books, radio plays, music, and games
