= Tolkien Calendars =

Products illustrating Middle-earth

Tolkien Calendars, displaying artworks interpreting J. R. R. Tolkien's Middle-earth, have appeared annually since 1976. Some of the early calendars were illustrated with Tolkien's own artwork. Artists including the Brothers Hildebrandt and Ted Nasmith produced popular work on themes from The Lord of the Rings and The Hobbit; later calendars also illustrated scenes from The Silmarillion. Some calendars have been named "Hobbit Calendar" or "Lord of the Rings Calendar", but "Tolkien Calendar" has remained the most popular choice of name.

== Artists ==
=== Starting out ===
The earliest known production is the 1969 calendar printed in the Meretricious fanzine in December 1968. It was illustrated by Tim Kirk.

Ian and Betty Ballantine of Ballantine Books, publishers of The Lord of the Rings in the United States from the 1960s, brought out a Tolkien Calendar in 1973; Ian Ballantine sent a copy to J. R. R. Tolkien, explaining that he always aimed to please the author.

Also in 1973, Tolkien's publishers Allen & Unwin, having experimented with some Middle-earth posters, decided to produce an "official" calendar of their own, and brought out their first one in 1974, using Tolkien's own illustrations for The Hobbit, The Lord of the Rings, and his then-unpublished legendarium (which would start to be presented to readers three years later as The Silmarillion). This was successful enough for further calendars featuring Tolkien's artwork to be issued for the years 1976 to 1979. After that, with no more suitable works by Tolkien available, paintings by other artists were used, starting in 1980 with stills from Ralph Bakshi's 1978 animated film The Lord of the Rings. Once they had permission from The Tolkien Estate to use the works of other artists, Allen & Unwin issued Tolkien Calendars every year from 1984 to 2009.

=== The Brothers Hildebrandt ===
Tim and Greg Hildebrandt, usually called the Brothers Hildebrandt, became well known for their Tolkien Calendars, which appeared from 1976 until Tim's death in 2006. The illustrator John Howe said he got "a real spark" from the Hildebrandts' calendars, as they showed him that Tolkien's novels could be illustrated.

In 1976, the Tolkien Calendar was reported to be "the bestselling calendar of all time". The 1977 Tolkien Calendar by the Brothers Hildebrandt was reported to have sold "nearly a half-million copies".

Illustration of the Fellowship of the Ring by the Brothers Hildebrandt for the 1976 Ballantine Books Tolkien Calendar. Their approach to the challenge of illustrating Tolkien prompted John Howe to become a Middle-earth artist.

=== Later artists ===
The publication of The Silmarillion in 1977 opened up new avenues for Tolkien artists, with its account of the tumultuous events of the Second Age of Arda. Well-known artists such as Alan Lee, who served as a concept artist for Peter Jackson's films of The Lord of the Rings, came to illustrate entire calendars such as the HarperCollins production for 2024. Ted Nasmith was sole artist for numerous calendars (including those for 1987, 1988, 1990, 1992, 1996, 2000, 2002, 2003, 2004, 2009, 2010, and 2022). Another artist who later worked as one of Jackson's concept artists, John Howe, was similarly featured on 1987, 1991, 1995, and 2001 Tolkien Calendars.

The 2015 calendar was illustrated with paintings by Mary Fairburn, whose work Tolkien had much liked in 1968, but which had remained unpublished until rediscovered by The Times Literary Supplement. Other calendars, such as that of 2023, presented artworks by multiple artists working in diverse styles, including Jenny Dolfen and Donato Giancola.

Publishers in at least 12 other English-speaking and European countries produced calendars; by 2016, some 433 different editions had been published.

== Reception ==
=== Self-imitation ===
Diana Paxson noted in Mythlore in 1984 that Lester del Rey hired Tolkien Calendar artists to illustrate Terry Brooks's 1977 The Sword of Shannara, the whole product "as closely modeled on [The Lord of the Rings] as could be managed without actually committing plagiarism." Mike Perschon, writing in Tor.com in 2012, similarly noted that del Rey hired the Brothers Hildebrandt, in Brooks's own words, to "mimic the Lord of the Rings calendar illustrations they had previously done."

Illustration for Terry Brooks's 1977 The Sword of Shannara by the Brothers Hildebrandt. Brooks stated that he had hired them to "mimic [their own] Lord of the Rings calendar illustrations".

=== Effects ===
Nasmith's 1992 calendar, with nine paintings of The Lord of the Rings and three of The Silmarillion, was welcomed in Mythlore as a "stunning, awe-inspiring achievement". "At the Court of the Fountain" revealed the "splendor of the Númenóreans" with its image of the citadel of Minas Tirith, its "low vantage point" allowing the White Tower to soar high in the sunshine. In contrast, "Éowyn and the Lord of the Nazgûl" shows the field of battle with "a sense of stop-action immediacy". Among The Silmarillion scenes, "Morgoth and the High King of the Noldor" gives, according to the review, an epic sense of "Hell-on-Middle-earth" as Fingolfin faces the enormous figure of the Dark Lord.

The independent scholar Denis Bridoux wrote that the early calendars such as the 1976 Hobbit Calendar enabled fans to enjoy Tolkien's artwork in a larger format than those in The Hobbit, and in colour too. The 1977 Lord of the Rings Calendar presented mostly new artwork, adding strongly, he wrote, "to my suspension of disbelief, and [it] enhanced my impression that Middle-earth was a 'real' place." This was so even though, he noted, some of the scenes depicted were not as in Tolkien's narrative.
