= Ted Nasmith =

Canadian artist

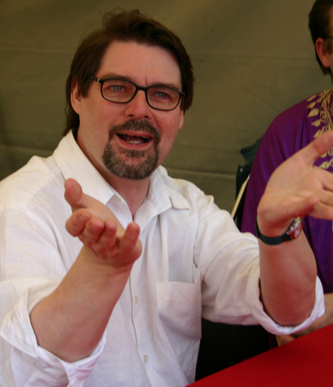
Nasmith in 2005

Ted Nasmith (born 1956) is a Canadian artist, illustrator and architectural renderer. He is best known as an illustrator of J. R. R. Tolkien's works The Hobbit, The Lord of the Rings and The Silmarillion. Tolkien praised and commented on his early work, something that encouraged him in his career.

== Early life ==
Nasmith's first attempt at illustrating Tolkien, his 1972 gouache painting The Unexpected Party depicting a scene from the start of The Hobbit. Tolkien commented that it made Bilbo look like a child.

Nasmith was born in Goderich, Ontario, Canada. As the son of a Royal Canadian Air Force officer, Nasmith's childhood was characterized by a series of moves, chiefly when his father was stationed in eastern France when Ted was 2 years old, until the family returned to Ontario 3 years later. By the time Nasmith became a teenager, they had settled in Toronto.

Nasmith's public school guidance counselor encouraged him to enter a high school which featured a 4-year commercial art program. During his third year of high school, however, Nasmith's sister introduced him to The Lord of the Rings, and it quickly became a huge inspiration and focus in his life. Nasmith writes:

It opened up in me a dormant love of lost and misty times, myth and legend. Not since childhood had I felt such a sense of 'home', unaware of the effects the intervening years had had in displacing it. I began immediately to draw scenes inspired by this magical, nostalgic realm, becoming absorbed for many hours at a time. (Nasmith, 2002)

In 1972, Nasmith mailed photographs of some of his paintings to J. R. R. Tolkien, including his gouache of The Unexpected Party. Tolkien responded by letter a few weeks later, both praising the work and making the comment that the rendition of Bilbo Baggins seemed a little too childlike. Still a teenager at the time, this early feedback from Tolkien encouraged Nasmith to strive for a more literal interpretation of Tolkien's works.

== Career ==
Nasmith's 1972 illustration of a Buick Skylark convertible, in the style of Art Fitzpatrick.

After graduation, Nasmith aspired to follow in the footsteps of automotive illustrator Art Fitzpatrick. However, since photography was replacing illustration in the business of car advertising, he instead found employment as an architectural renderer, showing a particular flair for the intense realism such illustrations often demand.

Nasmith's Tolkien artwork, which echoes the luminist landscapes and Victorian neoclassical styles, eventually caught the attention of Tolkien's publishers, who included four of his paintings in the 1987 Tolkien Calendar. His artwork has appeared in many of these calendars, including several where he is the sole featured artist (1987, 1988, 1990, 1992, 1996, 2000, 2002, 2003, 2004, 2009, 2010).

In October 1996, Nasmith was asked by Tolkien's publishers to provide the artwork for the first illustrated edition of The Silmarillion, during which time Ted developed a strong working relationship with Christopher Tolkien. The illustrated edition was published in 1998; in 2004, a second edition was published featuring many more paintings by Nasmith.

In early 1999, representatives for Peter Jackson and New Line Cinema invited Ted Nasmith to join John Howe and Alan Lee to work as a concept artist for The Lord of the Rings film trilogy. According to Nasmith,

"They invited me to be there with the others in New Zealand to help with conceptual art, and made me a nice offer. However, I was going through a personal crisis unrelated to my art, and in the end, being that it would also force me to abandon my freelance obligations and be away indefinitely, I reluctantly declined, settling the question in my mind after very careful deliberation."

Nasmith is a songwriter, guitarist and tenor. Much of his musical work is likewise inspired by Tolkien's writings. His first commercial album, The Hidden Door: Songs in the Key of Enchantment, was released in 2007. He has worked on a musical project entitled Beren and Lúthien: A Song Cycle, with his friend Alex Lewis, and has a close friendship with Caspar Reiff, one of the founders of The Tolkien Ensemble.

In latter years, he has illustrated a deluxe 2-volume limited edition of George R. R. Martin's A Game of Thrones novel. It took about three years to complete the set of over 80 illustrations, most in pencil, with six in colour. He is among the illustrators of the book The World of Ice and Fire, an encyclopedia of the fantasy realms of George R.R. Martin's epic novels. Ted worked closely with the Ice and Fire author to design castles according to the author's specifications. They were featured in the 2011 Song of Ice and Fire calendar.

Nasmith was commissioned by the video game developer Turbine and later the spin-off studio Standing Stone Games to create the 'key art' of the major updates for the online game based on Tolkien's work, The Lord of the Rings Online in 2015 and 2017. His artwork is being used as promotional materials, on the website and within the game as loading screens, notably for the Mordor expansion in 2017.

== Personal life ==
Nasmith lives just outside Toronto with his wife Donna and three children.

== See also ==
- Works inspired by J. R. R. Tolkien
