= Art Fitzpatrick =

American art director (1919–2015)

Arthur M. Fitzpatrick (November 24, 1919 – November 16, 2015) was an American art director widely known for his automotive art and advertising illustrations. Fitz, as he was often called, was noted for his work was on the Pontiac "wide-track" campaign from 1959-1972, working with Van Kaufman. Fitzpatrick had several careers over eight decades, including automobile designing, art director and stamp designer. Near the end of his career, he designed two series of automobile stamps for the U.S. Postal Service, released in 2005 and 2008.

== Early years ==
In 1936, Fitzpatrick enrolled at the Detroit Society of Arts and Crafts (now the College for Creative Studies). At that time, he was 18 years old and worked at Chrysler at night to pay his way. John Tjaarda, the head stylist at the Briggs Body Company, hired him as an apprentice designer, where he worked on various projects for Chrysler, Packard and Lincoln. Fitzpatrick is credited with designing the 1940 Packard 180 sedan.

He moved to California with his parents in 1938 and took a job with Howard "Dutch" Darrin, where Fitzpatrick developed designs for Darrin-modified Packards.

Fitzpatrick served in the Naval Aviation Training and the Naval Office of Research and Invention during World War II, then landed a contract to illustrate Mercury's postwar ads before he left the Navy. After World War II, Mercury signed Fitzpatrick to create advertising images. While at Mercury, Fitzpatrick began working with Van Kaufman, a former Disney animator, whose specialized in figurative and scenic drawing.

In 1953, General Motors hired Fitzpatrick and Kaufman to serve as the Buick division's advertising artists. They moved to Pontiac in 1959 to produce the artwork for the Pontiac "wide-track" campaign, which concluded in 1971. "Wide-track" was the longest, and arguably the most successful, ad campaign in American automobile industry history. In 1972, Fitzpatrick and Kaufman moved to General Motors' European subsidiary, Opel, where they produced advertising artwork for several years.

== Later years ==
Fitzpatrick continued to produce signed and numbered prints and artist proofs of his work, eventually adapting to digital illustration techniques. He consulted with Pixar Animation Studios on the development of feature movie Cars.

Fitzpatrick continued to lecture widely and appeared at venues such as the Center For Creative Studies and the Gilmore Car Museum in Michigan. He gave his last presentation at the Automobile Driving Museum in El Segundo, California in October 2015.

Fitzpatrick drew two series of top-selling commemorative stamps for the U.S. Postal Service titled "America on the Move" which were released in 2005 and 2008. The first series celebrated 1950s sporty cars, such as the Chevrolet Corvette, Ford Thunderbird and Kaiser Darrin. The second set, "tail fins and chrome," featured such cars as the 1959 Cadillac Eldorado, Chrysler 300C and Lincoln Premiere.

== Personal life ==
Fitzpatrick was married twice and had one daughter.

Art Fitzpatrick died at 96 years on November 16, 2015 in Carlsbad, California after a short illness.

== Awards and honors ==
Fitzpatrick was the recipient of numerous automotive and advertising industry awards and honors.

Fitzpatrick received the first national Andy Award (the advertising industry's equivalent of the Oscar) in 1964 by the Advertising Club of New York City.

In 2012, he received a Lifetime Achievement Award from the Art Center College of Design in Pasadena, where he had served as a guest lecturer since 1965. Fitzpatrick was an honorary member of the Classic Car Club of America (CCCA) and the Automotive Fine Art Society (AFAS). In Fitzpatrick's honor, the AFAS presents an award annually at the Pebble Beach Concours d'Elegance.

== Books ==
A book of Fitzpatrick's work with Van Kaufman was published on August 23, 2021: "Art Fitzpatrick & Van Kaufman: Masters of the Art of Automobile Advertising" ISBN 978-0-9779236-2-5.
