= Frodo Lives! =

Counterculture slogan

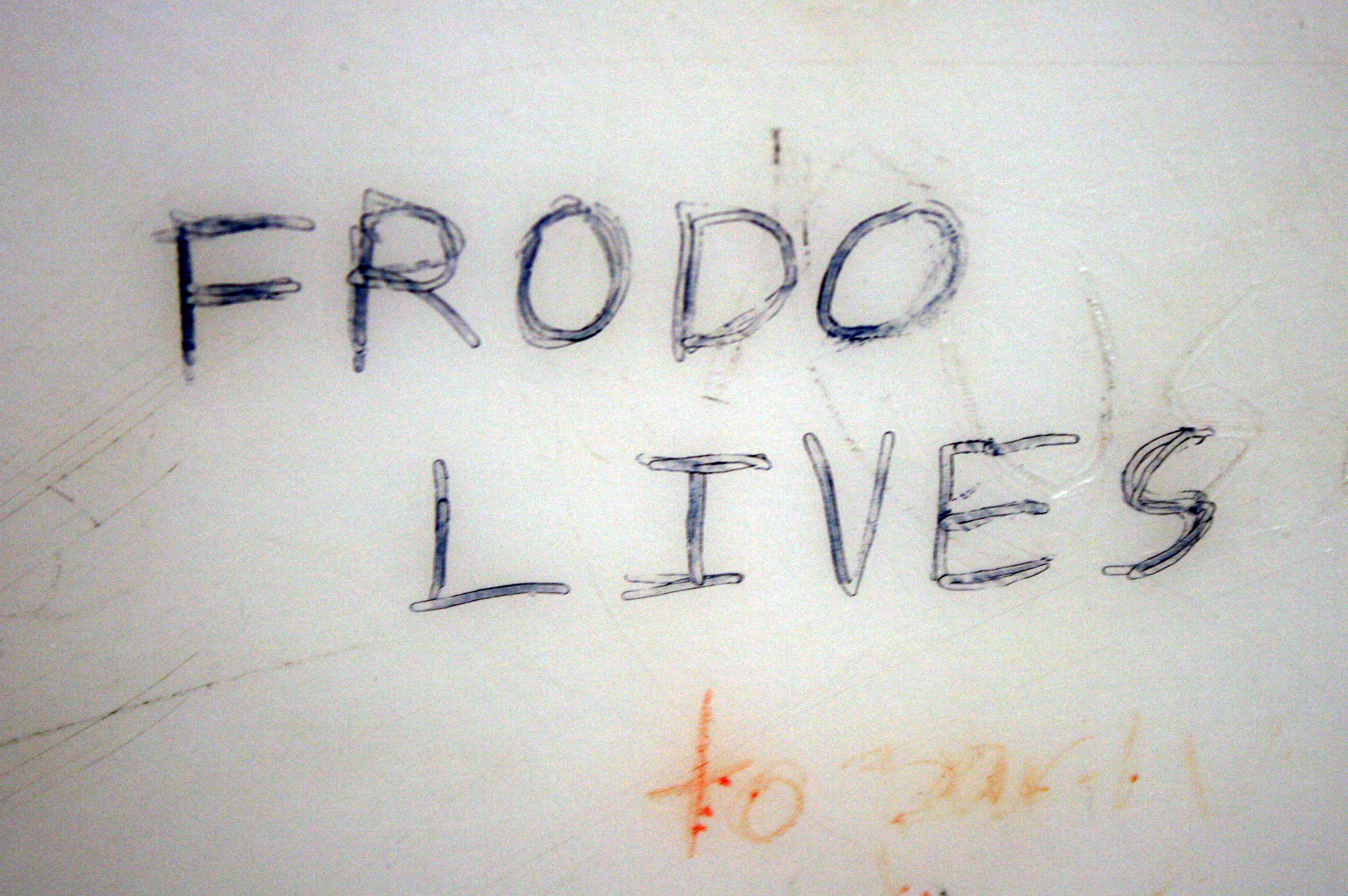

"Frodo Lives!" was a popular counterculture slogan in the 1960s and 1970s, referring to the character Frodo Baggins from J. R. R. Tolkien's fantasy novel The Lord of the Rings, commonly associated with the hippie movement. In context, it was actually a response to the Jesus movement when people were proclaiming and wearing Jesus Lives shirts.

The phrase was used frequently in graffiti, buttons, bumper-stickers, T-shirts, and other materials. It was the title of a 1967 single released under the band name "The Magic Ring" by Smash Records. It was later displayed during the activation of a computer virus in the early 1990s, in large letters with a moving border. This virus was created on the MS-DOS Disk operating system.

Hippies who may be pushing thirty wear buttons that read "Frodo Lives" and decorate their pads with maps of Middle Earth ...

—Theodore Roszak

The term first became popular following release of the Ballantine Books paperback edition of the books in 1965, exposing them to a larger number of readers. While no longer as pervasive as it once was, the term continues to appear in newspaper articles and popular culture related to Tolkien's stories, and was used in merchandising items for the early-2000s New Line Cinema The Lord of the Rings film trilogy.
