= Rivendell =

Fictional valley of Elves in J. R. R. Tolkien's Middle-earth

- J. R. R. Tolkien's legendarium location
- J. R. R. Tolkien's 1937 painting of Rivendell
- First appearance: The Hobbit (1937)

In-universe information
- Other names: Imladris; Karningul; Last Homely House East of the Sea
- Type: Refuge of the Elves; Hidden Refuge
- Ruled by: Elrond
- Location: eastern Eriador: a western valley of the Misty Mountains
- Lifespan: S.A. 1697 – Abandoned by F.A. 120
- Founder: Elrond

Rivendell (Sindarin: Imladris) is a valley in J. R. R. Tolkien's fictional world of Middle-earth, representing both a homely place of sanctuary and a magical Elvish otherworld. It is an important location in The Hobbit and The Lord of the Rings, being the place where the quest to destroy the One Ring begins.

Rivendell's feeling of peace may have contributed to the popularity of The Lord of the Rings during the war-troubled 1960s. Scholars have noted that Rivendell is the home of Elvish song, from the hymn to Elbereth, recalling Tolkien's Catholicism, to the complex Song of Eärendil with its multiple poetic devices. Others have written that it resembles the Celtic Otherworld of Tír na nÓg and that it physically recalls the valley of Lauterbrunnen in Switzerland, where Tolkien went hiking in 1911.

== Etymology ==
Rivendell is a direct translation or calque into English of the Sindarin Imladris, both meaning "deep valley". The name Rivendell is formed by two English elements: "riven" (split, cloven) and "dell" (valley). Imladris was rendered "Karningul" in Westron, the "Common Tongue" of Middle-earth represented as English in the text of The Lord of the Rings. The house of Elrond in Rivendell is also called The Last Homely House East of the Sea, alluding to the wilderness (Rhovanion) that lies east of the Misty Mountains. (Note: Tolkien 1955, Appendix F, "On Translation")

== Fiction ==
Image map with clickable links of the north-west of Middle-earth at the end of the Third Age, showing Rivendell just West of the Misty Mountains (top centre) by the River Bruinen. The Great West Road leads westwards from there to Bree and the Shire.

=== Geography ===
Rivendell lay in eastern Eriador at the edge of a narrow gorge of the river Bruinen (one of the main approaches to Rivendell comes from the nearby Ford of Bruinen), well hidden in the moorlands and foothills of the Hithaeglir or Misty Mountains. Contrary to the map of western Middle-earth published in The Lord of the Rings, the Great East Road did not, in Tolkien's view, lead through Rivendell: Rivendell was maintained as a hidden valley away from the road to the High Pass. (Note: Tolkien 1937, ch 3 "A Short Rest") (Note: Tolkien 1937, ch. 18 "The Return Journey") (Note: Tolkien 1937, ch. 19 "The Last Stage") Like Hobbiton, it is at about the same latitude as Tolkien's workplace, Oxford. (Note: Carpenter 2023, #294 to Charlotte and Denis Plimmer of The Daily Telegraph, 8 February 1967)

=== History ===
Rivendell was founded in the Second Age after the Dark Lord Sauron's destruction of the Elvish land of Eregion. Rivendell remained as the only Elven settlement in eastern Eriador; Gil-galad gave Elrond the Ring Vilya, providing him with the power to protect Rivendell and slow the passage of time in its hidden valley: indeed, Rivendell kept its own calendar. (Note: Tolkien 1955, Appendix D, "The Calendars") (Note: Tolkien 1980, part 2, "The Second Age" ch. 4 "The History of Galadriel and Celeborn", "Concerning Galadriel and Celeborn") (Note: Tolkien 1954a, book 2, ch. 1 "Many Meetings") Rivendell survived repeated attacks in the Third Age by the armies of the Witch-king of Angmar. Rivendell held the heirlooms of the Rangers of the North from the lost kingdom of Arnor, including the shards of Elendil's sword Narsil, the Sceptre of Annúminas, and the Star of Elendil. Elrond fostered the children of the heirs to Arnor's throne, the last being Aragorn. While in Rivendell, Aragorn met and fell in love with Elrond's daughter, Arwen. They were married after he was crowned king of both Gondor and Arnor. (Note: Tolkien 1955, Appendix A: The Tale of Aragorn and Arwen) Sauron's enemies including Elrond formed the White Council, which met in Rivendell, as when the Council decided to eject the Necromancer from his fortress in Dol Guldur. (Note: Tolkien 1954a, book 2, ch. 2 "The Council of Elrond") The protagonists of The Hobbit take advice from Elrond in Rivendell. The protagonists of The Lord of the Rings meet in Rivendell, attend the Council of Elrond, and decide on the quest to destroy the One Ring. The hero Aragorn's sword is reforged as Andúril by Rivendell's smiths. (Note: Tolkien 1954a, book 2, ch. 3 "The Ring Goes South") When the One Ring is destroyed, Elrond's ring loses its power, and he leaves to sail for Valinor. (Note: Tolkien 1955, Appendix B, "The Great Years") (Note: Tolkien 1955, Appendix A, "The Númenórean Kings", "The Tale of Aragorn and Arwen")

== Analysis ==
=== Physical origins ===
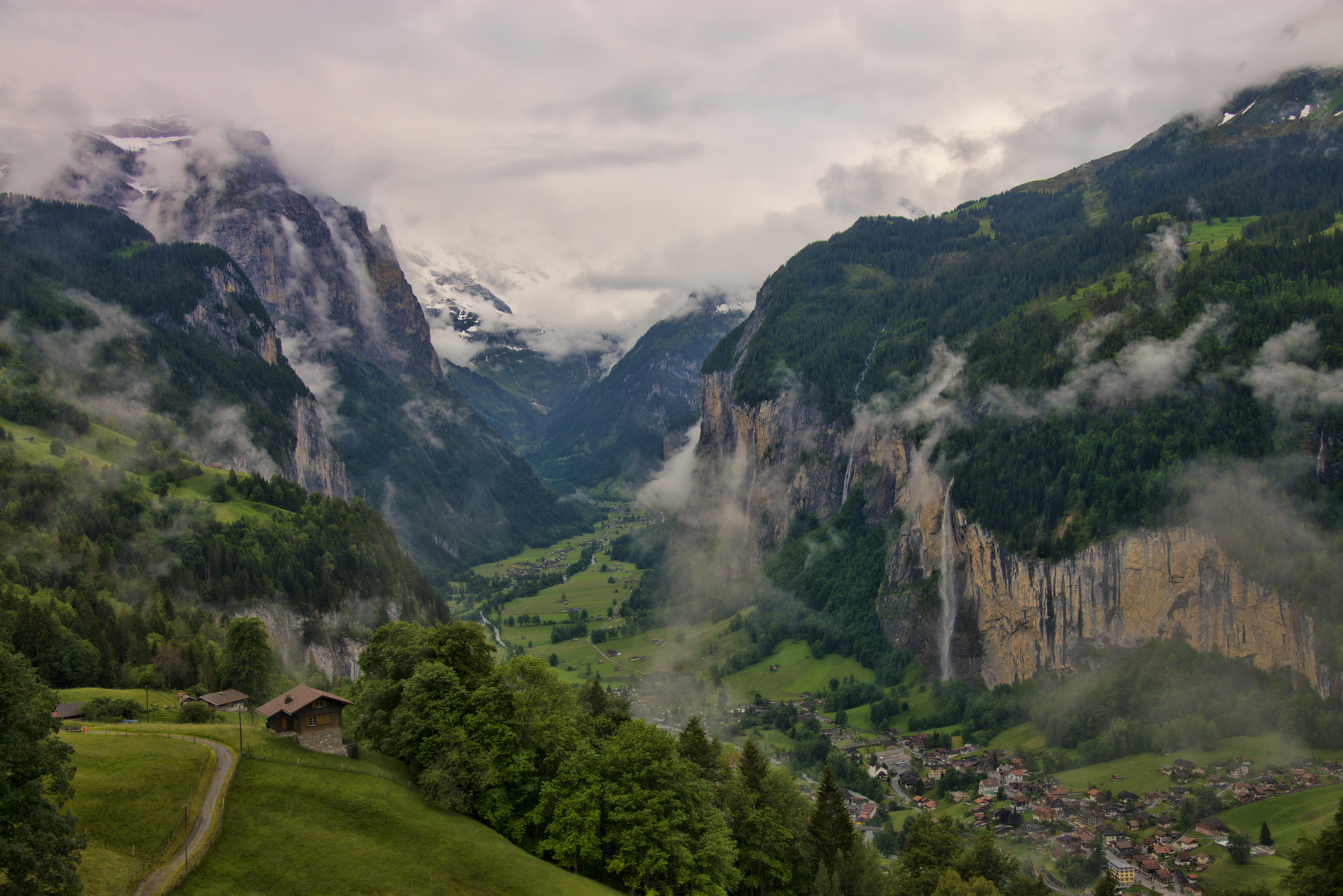
Tolkien based Rivendell on his 1911 visit to the Lauterbrunnental in Switzerland.

The Rivendell valley is based upon the valley of Lauterbrunnen in Switzerland, where Tolkien had gone hiking. Tolkien stated directly that "From Rivendell to the other side of the Misty Mountains, the journey ... including the glissade [of Bilbo and the Dwarves] down the slithering stones into the pine woods ... is based on my adventures in Switzerland in 1911". (Note: Carpenter 2023, #306 to Michael Tolkien, 1967-8)

The medievalist Marjorie Burns writes that Bilbo's approach to Rivendell parallels the early fantasy writer and translator of Norse legend William Morris's approach through the wilds of Iceland to a place he called "Water-dale" (Vatnsdale); both ride across uplands dotted with patches of green, becoming extremely tired; both then cross narrow ravines, and bogs; and both arrive at a hidden valley that offers shelter and comfort. In another place, Morris crosses a "narrow, bridge-like rock", just as Bilbo faces a "narrow bridge of stone without a parapet" on entering Rivendell.

=== A place of sanctuary ===
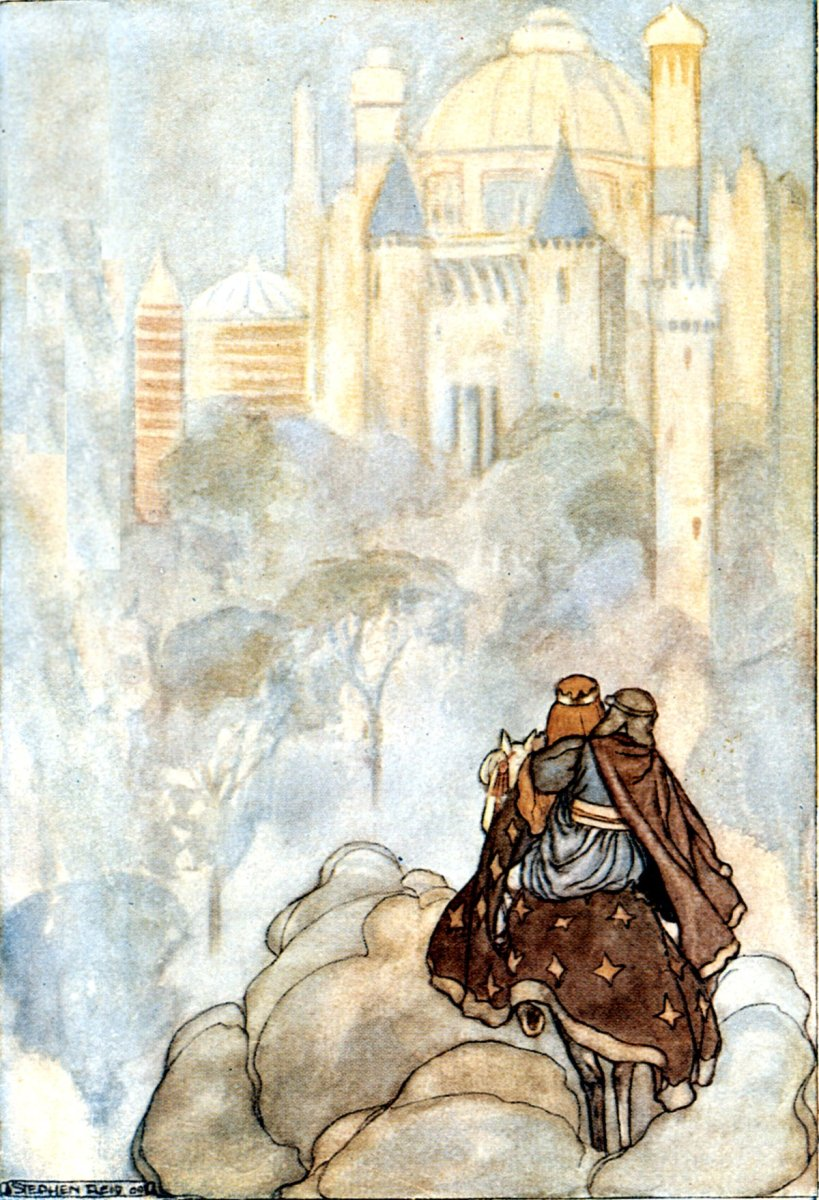
Rivendell has been compared to the Celtic Otherworld, here in a 1910 illustration by Stephen Reid

Matthew T. Dickerson, in the J. R. R. Tolkien Encyclopedia, writes that Rivendell consistently represents a sanctuary, a place that felt like home, throughout the legendarium. The journalist Jane Ciabattari writes that a major reason for the popularity of Lord of the Rings was the desire for escape among the Vietnam War generation. She compares the military-industrial complex with Mordor, and suggests that they yearned for a place of peace, just as Frodo Baggins felt an "overwhelming longing to rest and remain at peace… in Rivendell". Burns writes that Rivendell and the other Elvish realm of Lothlórien parallel the Celtic Otherworld (in Irish, Tír na nÓg), being hard to find, but if one is admitted and welcomed, one crosses a river, symbolising the spiritual transition from the ordinary realm, and "the weary adventurer is transported into a haven of Elven hospitality and delight". There are multiple markers of the transition:

To enter Rivendell is to leave, for a time, the uplands' bleak, mountainous, northerly terrain. First comes the steep descent ...; pines are replaced by beech and oak; the air grows warmer; the first of the elves greet them with laughter and song, and then comes the inevitable water crossing that divides the rest of Middle-earth from the inner core of every Elven realm.

Burns notes that both "Riven" and "dell" suggest a low place into which one must descend; and that a descent is characteristic of Celtic tales of entry into the underground realm of the Tuatha Dé Danann, whose chiefs each rule a burial mound.

=== Heroic quest's starting-point ===
The philologist and Tolkien scholar Tom Shippey remarks that Tolkien, a Christian, was extremely careful with dates and timelines, but that hardly any readers notice that the Fellowship sets out from Rivendell on its quest on 25 December, the date of Christmas, and succeeds, destroying the Ring and causing the fall of Sauron, on 25 March, the date in Anglo-Saxon tradition for the Crucifixion.

The Tolkien scholar Verlyn Flieger writes that both Frodo and Aragorn receive their renewed magic swords in Rivendell, marking them out as heroes in the epic tradition of Sigurd and Arthur, at the start of their quest.

=== Cultural allusions ===
Shippey contrasts the versions of the Old Walking Song sung by Bilbo and Frodo. Bilbo follows the "Road ... with eager feet", hoping to reach the peace of Rivendell, to retire and take his ease; whereas Frodo sings "with weary feet", hoping somehow to reach Mordor bearing the Ring, and to try to destroy it in the Cracks of Doom: diametrically opposed destinations and errands. He notes that Rivendell was the home of Elvish song, and cites Tolkien's statement that the song that the Hobbits hear in Rivendell, A Elbereth Gilthoniel invoking the semi-divine Varda, was a hymn suggestive of his own devout Catholicism. Shippey writes, too, that Tolkien had Bilbo write and sing the Song of Earendil in Rivendell, making use of multiple poetic devices – rhyme, internal half-rhyme, alliteration, alliterative assonance, and "a frequent if irregular variation of syntax" – to create a mysterious Elvish effect of "rich and continuous uncertainty, a pattern forever being glimpsed but never quite grasped." Rebecca Ankeny comments that Tolkien uses verse, too, to signal the horror of the Elves when Gandalf speaks the dark lord's rhyme of the Rings aloud, in the Black Speech, threatening the end of Rivendell.

The Tolkien scholar Gergely Nagy notes that Tolkien wanted to present the complex set of writings of The Silmarillion as a seemingly-genuine collection of tales and myths within the frame of his fictional Middle-earth; he modified The Lord of the Rings to ascribe the documents to Bilbo, supposedly written in the years he spent in Rivendell, and preserved in the fictitious Red Book of Westmarch, its name alluding to the Red Book of Hergest.

Burns writes that Rivendell, "the Last Homely House", offers a welcoming home, repeating the pattern set in both The Hobbit and The Lord of the Rings of "easy-going but tidy bachelor indulgence" from Bilbo's Bag End hobbit-hole onwards; despite Arwen, there is hardly anything "of the feminine". Shippey states that Frodo has "to be dug out ... of no fewer than five 'Homely Houses'", of which Rivendell is the last.

== Adaptations ==
In Peter Jackson's 2001 film The Fellowship of the Ring, Rivendell is romantically conceived, with sophisticated culture. The "post-Ruskinian" style does not match Tolkien's own illustrations.

In Peter Jackson's 2001 film The Fellowship of the Ring, Rivendell was represented by Kaitoke Regional Park, New Zealand, though the waterfalls were added with computer-generated imagery. Brian Rosebury comments that Jackson presents the Elves as sophisticated, where Tolkien made them close to nature. All the same, he writes, the film Rivendell's "architecture and ornaments are dominated by natural motifs", suggesting "integration with nature, but at one remove", something that works well for the "Portmeirion-like idyll" of the portrayed Rivendell. Rosebury describes the design as "post-Ruskinian", as in pre-Raphaelite paintings, William Morris's Arts and Crafts designs, and Art Nouveau architectural details. These differ from Tolkien's own illustrations, but in a way, Rosebury suggests, that Tolkien would have liked as it matches his dislike of industrialised manufacture.

== Legacy ==
In the period of counterculture in the Western world of the 1960s and 1970s, a commune called Maos Lyst (Mao's Delight) was founded on the island of Zealand, Denmark, in 1968, its inhabitants replacing their surnames with Kløvedal, the Danish for Rivendell. Several of them later became well-known cultural personalities in the country. The Rivendell Winery operated from 1987 to 2008 in New York's Hudson River Valley. The Tolkien Ensemble set all the songs in The Lord of the Rings to music on four CDs between 1997 and 2005, each with "Rivendell" in its title. The Swedish classical composer Anna-Lena Laurin has written a work for two guitars entitled "Rivendell". The Canadian progressive rock band Rush memorialised the Elvish sanctuary in the song "Rivendell" on their 1975 studio album Fly by Night. The song focuses on the tranquillity and seemingly endless time a weary traveller could find there, with lyrics such as "Elfin songs and endless nights / Sweet wine and soft relaxing lights / Time will never touch you / Here in this enchanted place".

The Dutch artist Cor Blok made numerous paintings of Middle-earth. The Tolkien scholar Daniel Howick especially admired Blok's "wonderfully atmospheric" 1960 painting of Rivendell.

== Sources ==
- Burns, Marjorie (2005). Perilous Realms: Celtic and Norse in Tolkien's Middle-earth. University of Toronto Press. pp. 152–154 (Elbereth/Varda in Valinor vs Galadriel in Middle-earth, formerly of Valinor). ISBN 978-0802038067.
- Carpenter, Humphrey, ed. (2023) [1981]. The Letters of J. R. R. Tolkien: Revised and Expanded Edition. New York: HarperCollins. ISBN 978-0-35-865298-4.
- Dickerson, Matthew (2013) [2006]. "Rivendell". In Drout, Michael D. C. (ed.). J. R. R. Tolkien Encyclopedia. Routledge. pp. 573–574. ISBN 978-0-415-86511-1.
- Flieger, Verlyn (2004). "Frodo and Aragorn: The Concept of the Hero". In Rose A. Zimbardo and Neil D. Isaacs (ed.). Understanding the Lord of the Rings: The Best of Tolkien Criticism. Houghton Mifflin. pp. 122–145. ISBN 978-0-618-42251-7.
- Nagy, Gergely (2020) [2014]. "The Silmarillion". In Lee, Stuart D. (ed.). A Companion to J. R. R. Tolkien. Wiley Blackwell. pp. 107–118. ISBN 978-1119656029.
- Rosebury, Brian (2003) [1992]. Tolkien : A Cultural Phenomenon. Palgrave. ISBN 978-1403-91263-3.
- Shippey, Tom (2005) [1982]. The Road to Middle-Earth: How J. R. R. Tolkien Created a New Mythology (Third ed.). HarperCollins. ISBN 978-0-261-10275-0.
- Tolkien, J. R. R. (1937). The Hobbit. United Kingdom: George Allen & Unwin.
- Tolkien, J. R. R. (1954a). The Fellowship of the Ring. The Lord of the Rings. Boston: Houghton Mifflin. OCLC 9552942.
- Tolkien, J. R. R. (1955). The Return of the King. The Lord of the Rings. Boston: Houghton Mifflin. OCLC 519647821.
- Tolkien, J. R. R. (1980). Christopher Tolkien (ed.). Unfinished Tales. Boston: Houghton Mifflin. ISBN 978-0-395-29917-3.
