= Cor Blok =

Dutch artist

- With his Middle-earth painting Battle of the Hornburg II, which he sold to J. R. R. Tolkien
- Born: Cornelis Blok; 18 February 1934; The Hague, Netherlands
- Died: 21 May 2021 (aged 87)
- Education: Academy of Fine Arts, Rotterdam; Royal Academy of Fine Arts, Antwerp
- Known for: A Tolkien Tapestry; "Barbarusia"
- Notable work: "Battle of the Hornburg"
- Style: Minimalist

Cornelis Blok (1934–2021), known as Cor, was a Dutch artist and art history teacher. He became well known as a Tolkien illustrator; Tolkien purchased one of his paintings.

== Life ==
Cornelis "Cor" Blok was born in The Hague, Netherlands on 18 February 1934. He studied at Rotterdam's Academy of Fine Arts and the Royal Academy of Fine Arts, Antwerp.

From 1956, he worked at Haags Gemeentemuseum, teaching art history and cataloguing the museum's Piet Mondrian collection. He also taught at Leiden University. He was influenced by modern artists including the Italian metaphysical painter Giorgio de Chirico, the German Dadaist Max Ernst, the Swedish multimedia artist Öyvind Fahlström, the British painter David Hockney, the Russian painter and critic Wassily Kandinsky, the Swiss-German Paul Klee, and the American R. B. Kitaj. He invented "Barbarusia", a fantasy realm with its own art and history, from 1953 to 1958; he held an exhibition of his Barbarusia drawings and structures in 1960 at the Haags Gemeentemuseum. From 1958, he made numerous paintings of scenes from The Lord of the Rings in a "quasi-primitive", minimalist style. He wrote and translated several illustrated books of art history. In later life, he created the surrealist comic strip album The Iron Parachute.

A retrospective exhibition of his artistic output was planned for 2020, but this was postponed because of the COVID-19 pandemic. Blok died on 17 April 2021; the exhibition eventually took place in June and July 2022, at Jansstraat 40, Haarlem.

== Illustrating Tolkien ==
Blok's 1960 painting "Rivendell" has been described as "wonderfully atmospheric".

Blok became interested in J. R. R. Tolkien's Middle-earth fantasy writings. He met Tolkien in 1961, showing him five of his Middle-earth paintings. Tolkien admired these, purchasing "Battle of the Hornburg II". (Note: The painting can be seen in the Illustrating Tolkien article.) Blok went on to create over 100 paintings of Tolkien's The Lord of the Rings, selling many of them. In 2011, Pieter Collier collected images of all of these paintings that he could trace, publishing them in the book A Tolkien Tapestry.

The Tolkien scholar Daniel Howick, reviewing the book for Mallorn, wrote that its publication was Tolkienesque, as the 100-odd paintings had to be tracked down individually. Something like the book could have surfaced in 1962, as it had been planned to have a version of The Lord of the Rings, fully illustrated by Pauline Baynes, with Blok serving in his professional capacity as historian of art; but the book was not printed. Of A Tolkien Tapestry, Howick commented that the paintings ranged from "brilliant" and complex, like "Battle of the Hornburg II", to much simpler works which he found less appealing. He noted, too, that Blok sometimes departed from Tolkien's text, for instance giving Gollum a beak, and allowing the comfortable hobbit-hole of Bag End to have an upstairs floor. Howick found some of the paintings "highly successful", like "The Petrified Trolls" and "Frodo's Vision on Amon Hen". He especially admired the "wonderfully atmospheric" painting "Rivendell".

== Works ==
=== Written ===
- 1967: Beeldspraak ("Metaphors").
- 1974: Catalogue of Piet Mondrian. Kunstmuseum Den Haag.
- 1975: Geschichte der abstrakten Kunst 1900-1960 (History of Abstract Art 1900-1960). (Illustrated). Cologne: Dumont Schauberg.
- 2003: Beeldvertalen ("Translating Images"). Amsterdam University Press.
- 2011: A Tolkien Tapestry: Pictures to Accompany the Lord of the Rings. HarperCollins.

=== Translated ===
- Ottonian Art by Hans Jantzen.

=== Illustrated ===
- 1965: Cover of In De Ban Van De Ring (The Lord of the Rings): Prisma. (Paperback, 3 volumes, in Dutch).
- 1996: Realms of Tolkien: Images of Middle-earth. HarperCollins.
- 1998: Tolkien Calendar 1998. HarperCollins.
- 2011: Official Tolkien Calendar 2011. HarperCollins.
- 2012: Official Tolkien Calendar 2012. HarperCollins.
- 2016: The Iron Parachute. (Canada)
