= Tolkienmoot =

Tabletop role-playing game comvention

- Status: Active
- Genre: Gaming
- Venue: Spokane, Washington
- Country: United States
- Inaugurated: 2005
- Most recent: 2021
- Attendance: 20–45 in-person, 100–200 online interactive participation
- Organizer: Eä Tolkien Society, an official smial of the UK Tolkien Society
- Filing status: non-profit/free
- Website: http://www.tolkienmoot.org/

Tolkienmoot is an annual convention run by the Eä Tolkien Society (official smial of the UK Tolkien Society) created for scholars, gamers, and enthusiasts of the works of J. R. R. Tolkien. It began under the name of Merpcon (for "Middle-earth Role Playing Conference") in 2005. Always a convention focused on Tolkien scholarly discussion and gaming in Middle-earth, its name was changed in 2009 as the venue expanded. The convention was founded by Hawke Robinson and others.

Tolkienmoot includes scholarly discussions and guest speakers, but also provides an emphasis on role-playing games. It is typically held annually on the third weekend of July in Spokane, Washington, typically for 1 to 5 days. The convention is open and free to the public. In 2022 it moved to a dedicated regular location at the non-profit RPG Research community center.

== Event details ==
The event is focused on J. R. R. Tolkien and his works, with a special emphasis on gaming, especially tabletop paper and dice Role playing games, using any role playing game system adapted or created for play in Middle-earth, as well as video games, wargames, and boardgames. Participation is both in-person and remote. Each event has guest speakers such as Tolkien scholars and published authors. These have included the author John Garth and the Tolkien scholar John D. Rateliff. Each event has a different theme, such as "Elves", "Hobbits", "Dunedain", or "Trees". Events explore new and old game systems such as Iron Crown Enterprises' Middle-Earth Role Playing; a Dungeons & Dragons 3.5 variant known as Ea RPG d20; Harnmaster adapted for use in Middle-earth; Adventures in Middle-earth by Cubicle 7; The One Ring Role-Playing Game 2nd Edition by Free League Publishing; and others. Tolkienmoots feature new Other Minds Magazine issues and have discussed papers such as "Tolkien's Love of Trees and the Environment".

Different approaches to the guest speaker segments have been used. The opening speaking session is typically presented by the convention founder, with a "state of the union" discussion about the current state of Tolkien scholarship, fandom, role-playing gaming community, project updates. Other sessions have sometimes been in a format called "Raw Hobbit", hosted by Tolkien essayist and author Michael Martinez as an homage to William Shatner's Raw Nerve talk show. Other sessions have included the interactive "Tolkien Youth Panel", while still other sessions generally include notable guest speakers (see list) with local and online audience participation in follow-up Q&A. The final sessions often overlap with episodes of Middle-earth Talk Radio as a live broadcast from the third day of the event with live audience participation both locally and online.

The founders of Tolkienmoot are also the founders of Other Minds Magazine and an official smial of the UK Tolkien Society, the Eä Tolkien Society based in Spokane, Washington, U.S.
