= Horus Engels =

German artist

Engels's design for the dustjacket of The Hobbit (1946)

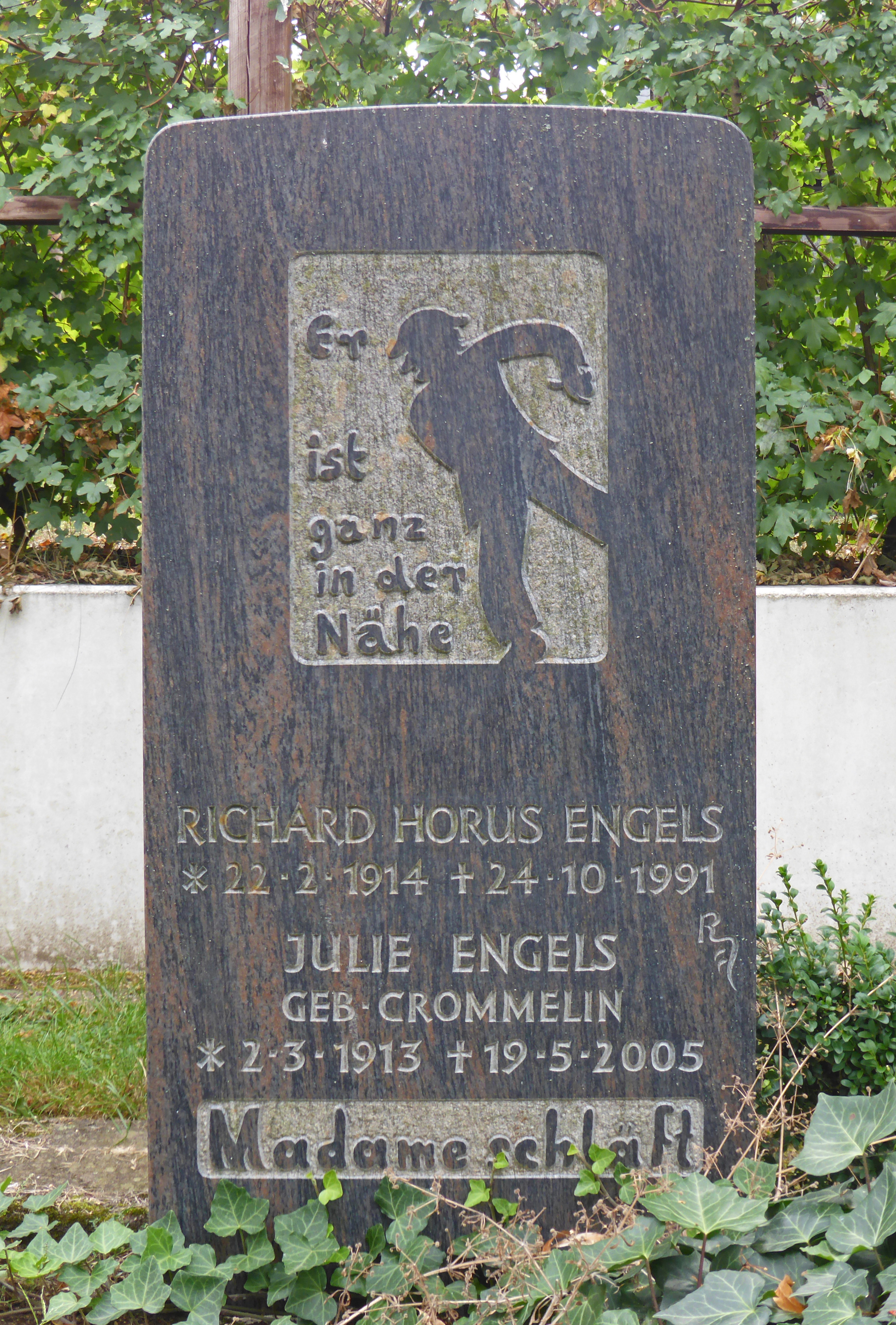
Gravestone

Richard 'Horus' Engels (1914–1991) was a German painter, sculptor and illustrator.

Engels was born in London, England, to German parents. In his youth Engels lived in Berlin and studied in Paris. He trained to be an economist and worked in the great Siemens factory, but then became an artist, and gained the nickname "Horus" by which he became known in artistic circles.

During World War II he served in the Wehrmacht and was captured by the Russian Army. After the war he moved to Wolfsburg where he met his Dutch wife, with whom he had a son and a daughter.

Engels put much detail and coloration in his illustration, as can be seen in his ten pictures for the tales of the Brothers Grimm. His studio was in the Castle Neuhaus near Wolfsburg. Engels was the Chairman of ISC (International Subud Committee) in 1971–75, and then Chairman of SICA (Subud International Cultural Association) in 1983–89.

In 1946 Richard Engels contacted J. R. R. Tolkien for a German edition of The Hobbit and sent him two illustrations of the Trolls and Gollum, which Tolkien found "too Disnified"; Tolkien commented in particular that he disliked "Bilbo with a dribbling nose, and Gandalf as a figure of vulgar fun rather than the Odinic wanderer that I think of". In 1957 the German publishing company Paulus-Verlag published the first German translation of The Hobbit by Walter Scherf as Kleiner Hobbit und der große Zauberer in which Engels's illustrations were finally printed.

== See also ==
- List of German painters

== Sources ==
- Carpenter, Humphrey, ed. (2023) [1981]. The Letters of J. R. R. Tolkien: Revised and Expanded Edition. New York: HarperCollins. ISBN 978-0-35-865298-4.
