= Alexander Korotich =

Russian artist

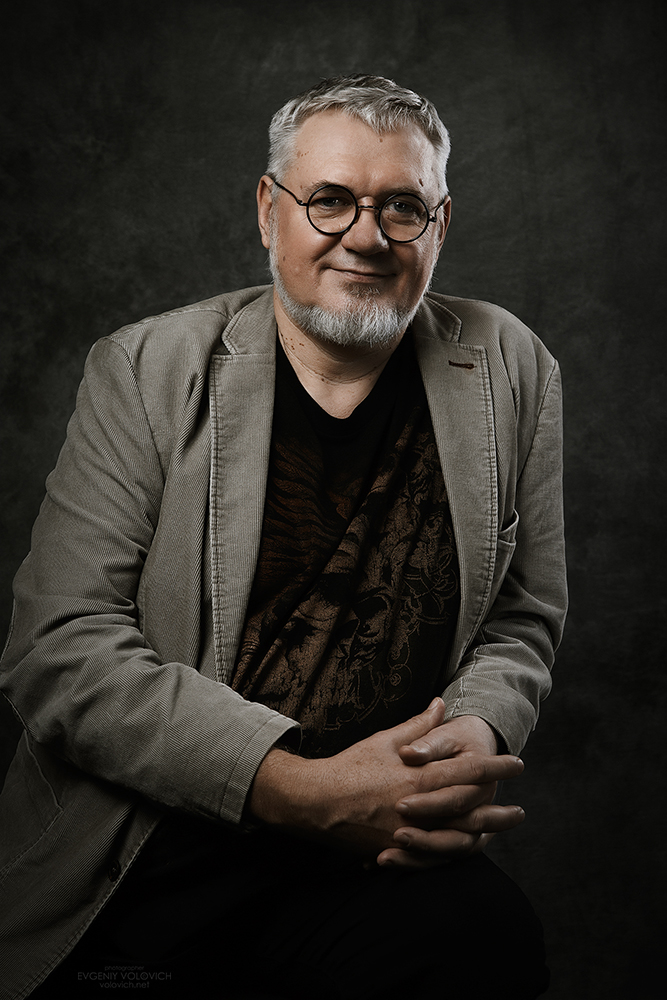
- Born: May 11, 1960 (age 66); Yekaterinburg
- Occupations: Artist, illustrator, designer
- Website: https://korotich.design/

Alexander Vladimirovich Korotich (Russian: Александр Владимирович Коротич; born 11 May 1960) is a Russian artist, designer, writer and teacher. He is a leading designer of Channel One, and art director of the project Zuza. A daily fairy tale for children.

== Biography ==
=== Early life ===
Alexander Korotich was born on 11 May 1960 in Yekaterinburg (then known as Sverdlovsk), son of Vladimir Ivanovich Korotich, professor of metallurgy at the Ural State Technical University, and Margarita Vasilievna Korotich, a teacher and translator. In 1977, after graduating from secondary school No. 36, Korotich entered the Sverdlovsk Institute of Architecture (now the Ural State University of Architecture and Art), from which he graduated with honours in 1984. He then taught design at the university's department of industrial architecture, and in 1986 he entered full-time graduate school at the Moscow Architectural Institute, specializing in Theory and History of Architecture. In 1989 he completed his PhD thesis The Theme of Function in Architecture. He returned to the Sverdlovsk Institute of Architecture's department of drawing as an associate professor. In 1995, he created the Book Design department within the institute.

=== Art illustration and design ===
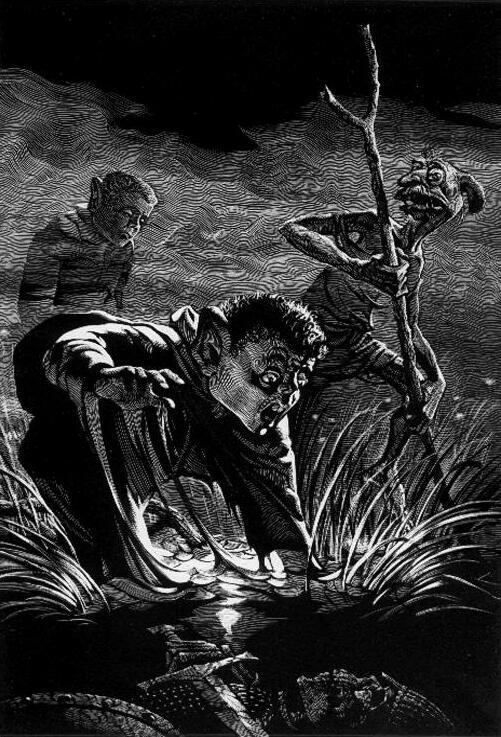
Frodo and Sam guided by Gollum through the Dead Marshes. One of a cycle of scraperboard drawings for The Lord of the Rings, 1984

In the 1980s, as a student, he made a cycle of scraperboard illustrations for J. R. R. Tolkien's The Lord of the Rings, which in 1990 was awarded a diploma of the All-Russian competition of works for children. Later he created illustrations for a collection of Tolkien's fairy tales (including Farmer Giles of Ham and Smith of Wootton Major) and poems. He prepared illustrations for many books, including works by Janusz Korczak, and a book of stories by C. S. Lewis, published in Russia.

=== Rock music graphics ===
In 1981, after holding the first rock music festival in the Urals, Korotich established friendly relations with the poet Ilya Kormiltsev. This led to a unique design for magnetic albums of the group Urfin Juice (also spelt "Urfin Dzhus" and "Oorfene Deuce").

In 1992, Vyacheslav Butusov, a friend from his student days, invited him to take part in the design of the album Foreign Land by the group Nautilus Pompilius, a successor to Urfin Juice.

=== Television design and video graphics ===
In 1998, Korotich was invited by Semyon Levin, head of the NTV-Design company, to develop a new design concept for the NTV channel, which in 1999 was awarded the National TEFI Award in the “Television Design” category. Since 2008, Korotich has been working as a leading designer in the ORT-design department of the First Channel television company.

Since 2006, Korotich has been working on the Zuza fairy tale series for preschoolers, where he writes both prose and poetry, and creates the illustrations. The romance of the Ural mining legends inspired him to create his own quasi-historical epic Tales of the Mountain-Fish, which became the first book created using the samizdat Internet service “Ridero”.

In 2006 he moved to Moscow to become a professor at the Moscow Architectural Institute. Among the courses he has run was one on creative thinking with Inna Albertovna Salikhova.

== Bibliography ==
- Fairy tales of the Zuza series
  - Fairy tale Zuza. Journey of a Clunker, Moscow, 2010, ISBN 978-5-8026-0192-1
  - Fairy tale Zuza. Lullaby for a butterfly, Moscow, 2011, ISBN 978-5-905255-01-4
  - Fairy tale Zuza. Bon appetit!, Moscow, 2012, ISBN 978-5-905255-02-1
  - Fairy tale Zuza. Fidget Button, Moscow, 2018, ISBN 978-5-6041489-0-7
  - Fairy tale Zuza. Light of the Star, Moscow, 2021
- Collection of poems Zuza. For those over three, Moscow, 2019, ISBN 978-5-4477-3013-0
- Book Forty Years With Fate, PervoGrad Publishing House, 2020. ISBN 978-5-6042851-3-8
- Book Fish Mountain, Moscow, 2015

== Discography ==
- "Urfin Juice"
- "Nautilus Pompilius"
- "Agatha Christie"
- "Chaif"
- "Nastya"
- Vyacheslav Butusov and "U-Piter" "Flowers and Thorns"
- Zuza and the Fidget Button CD
- Zuza. Lullaby for a Butterfly CD
- Zuza. Bon appetit CD
- Zuza. Journey of a Clunker CD
- Zuza. Star Light CD
- Zuza. Songs and Dances vinyl record and CD

Cover of the vinyl record "Zuza. Songs and Dances" of the children's fairy-tale series "Zuza".

== Awards ==
- 1999 Winner of the TEFI National Prize in the nomination "Television Design" for a new design concept for the NTV channel.
- 2001 "Azure Star" for ATN TV channel (Yekaterinburg).
- 2002–2004 "OMNI Awards" in the US for the design of the RTR TV channel and the RTVI television network.
- 2008–2009, the Zuza.ru website became a diploma winner of the Runet Prize and a laureate of the Positive Content Award - 2009
- 2010 the project “Zuza” became the Laureate of the first All-Russian festival of media projects for children and youth “The World of Bibigon - 2010”, held under the auspices of the All-Russian State Television and Radio Broadcasting Company.
- 2011 Radio play “Zuza. Journey of a Clunker" was one of the three nominees for the National Award " Radiomania 2011" in the "Children's Radio Program" category.
- 2011 The website www.juja.ru “Zuza: a daily fairy tale for children” became a winner of the site competition "Positive Content - 2011" in the special category "Best Children's Site".
- 2012 Winner of the “Innovative Toy 2012” competition in the “Game/Toy Using High and New Technologies” Nomination for the “Zuza” Application for iPad and iPhone. (as part of the exhibition "Childhood/Toys & Kids Russia 2012" in Moscow)
- 2012 Children's multimedia project "Zuza" -Laureate of the National Competition "Book of the Year - 2012" in the "Electronic Book" category]
- 2018 – laureate of the national literary award “Poet of the Year” of the Russian Union of Writers in the category “Best Children’s Poetry”
