= Jenny Dolfen =

German illustrator and teacher

Detail of Dolfen's painting "Eärendil the Mariner", which in 2014 won her the first of her awards for best artwork from the Tolkien Society.

Jenny Dolfen (born 1975) is a German illustrator and teacher, known especially for her illustrations of J. R. R. Tolkien's Middle-earth.

== Life ==
Jenny Dolfen was born in Bremerhaven, and in 2001, she received a degree in English and Latin at the University of Cologne. Dolfen lives near Aachen with her husband and her two children.

Dolfen has done artwork for several role-playing games, including Fuller Flippers' Quest Cards, Action Studios' Realms of Wonder, Final Sword Productions' The World of Erien and the German Das Schwarze Auge.

She is known for her artwork based on the Middle-earth works of J. R. R. Tolkien, chiefly The Silmarillion. Dolfen won the inaugural Tolkien Society Award in the category "best artwork" in 2014, for her watercolour painting "Eärendil the Mariner". Since then she has won awards in 2018 for "The Hunt", a depiction of Finrod Felagund going on a hunt with the Fëanoreans Maedhros and Maglor in Eastern Beleriand; and in 2020 the T-shirt design "The Professor", celebrating 50 years of The Tolkien Society, with Middle-earth characters and places within the outline of a pipe-smoking J. R. R. Tolkien.

Dolfen has made illustrations for George R. R. Martin's novel A Song of Ice and Fire, as documented in the 2005 book The Art of George R.R. Martin's A Song of Ice and Fire.

== See also ==
- Works inspired by J. R. R. Tolkien
