= John Howe (illustrator) =

Canadian Tolkien illustrator (born 1957)

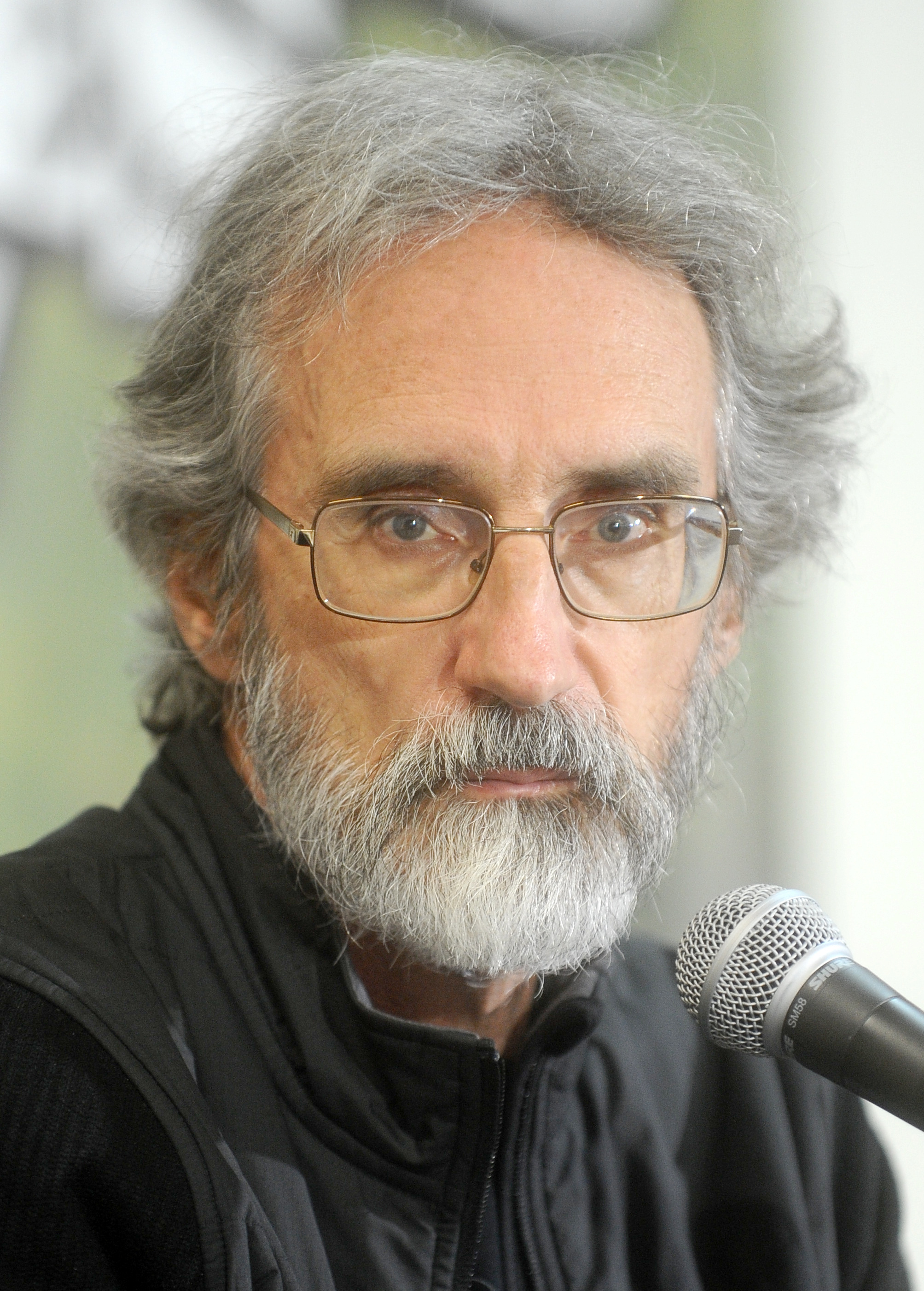
- Howe in 2017
- Born: August 21, 1957 (age 68); Vancouver, British Columbia, Canada
- Education: Ecole des arts décoratifs, Strasbourg
- Known for: Book illustration, decoration
- Notable work: Illustration of Fantasy literature Concept design for The Lord of the Rings film series Conceptual design for The Hobbit film series
- Website: https://www.john-howe.com

John Howe (born August 21, 1957) is a Canadian book illustrator and concept designer, best-known for his artwork of J. R. R. Tolkien's Middle-earth.

John Howe is best known for his work on both of Peter Jackson's Middle-earth film trilogies, The Lord of the Rings (2001–2003) and The Hobbit (2012–2014).

== Early life ==
John Howe was born in Vancouver, British Columbia. He was drawing from pre-school age, with his mother's help. Around primary school age he found his mother's ability no longer living up to his expectations, and even got frustrated once at both his mother and himself at not being able to draw a cow to his expectations. Howe's school years were complicated by moves which took place with a timing that left the art classes full, and left him in classes like power mechanics. He did find his ability as a draughtsman to be profitable in biology class though, where he and a friend would produce renderings of microscopic organisms for classmates at fifty cents each. As a child, he collected the covers of paperbacks. His collection included items from Frank Frazetta, Barry Smith, and Bernie Wrightson. In his adolescence, Howe read The Lord of the Rings trilogy by J. R. R. Tolkien. He said he got "a real spark" from the Tolkien Calendars of paintings by the Brothers Hildebrandt, which showed him that Tolkien's books could be illustrated. Howe made drawings of his own versions of the scenes depicted in the calendar. These drawings, according to Howe, may not have survived.

A year after his high school graduation, Howe moved to Strasbourg, France to attend college. The following year, he enrolled into the École des arts décoratifs. He cites his experience of this period as follows:

The first year was spent not understanding much, the second at odds with what I did manage to understand, and the third eager to get out, although in retrospect I certainly owe whatever clarity of thought I possess to the patience of the professor of Illustration.

Throughout his first years in Europe, Howe was taking in as much as he could in the way of art, architecture and everything that was "simultaneously ancient and novel." He says the only piece of his art work that survived from this period is his "The Lieutenant of the Black Tower of Barad-dûr", a piece inspired by Tolkien's The Lord of the Rings. He says if this is not his first published piece, it must certainly be the earliest. Howe's earliest commissions included political cartoons, magazine illustrations, comics, animated films, advertising, of which he says were nightmares. He said that he would end up redoing sketches so many times that there was nothing left of "his" in them. This frustrated him, and he wondered how he would ever make it in the profession.

== Career ==
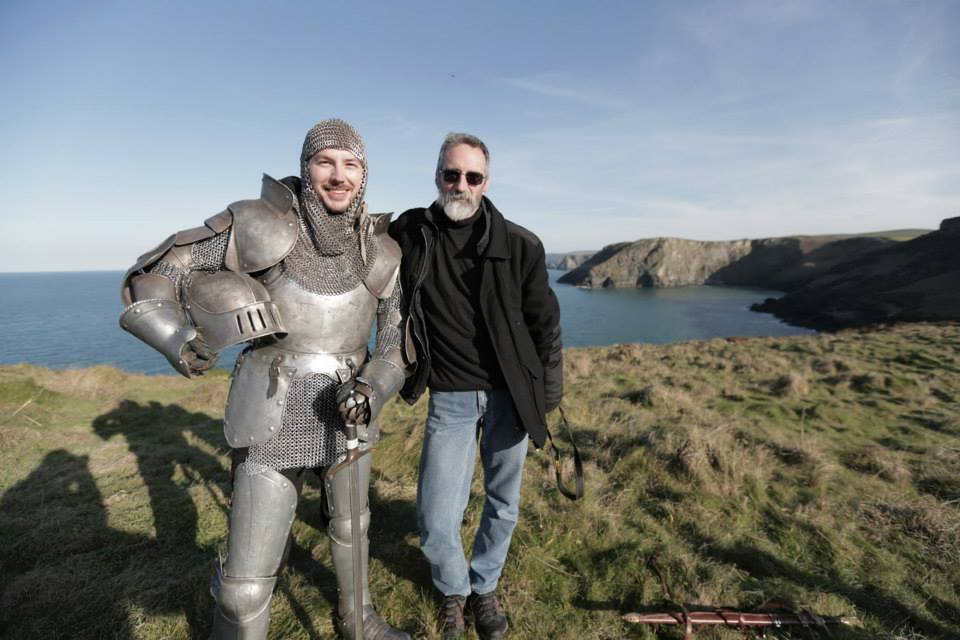
With Alexis Metzinger during filming, 2014

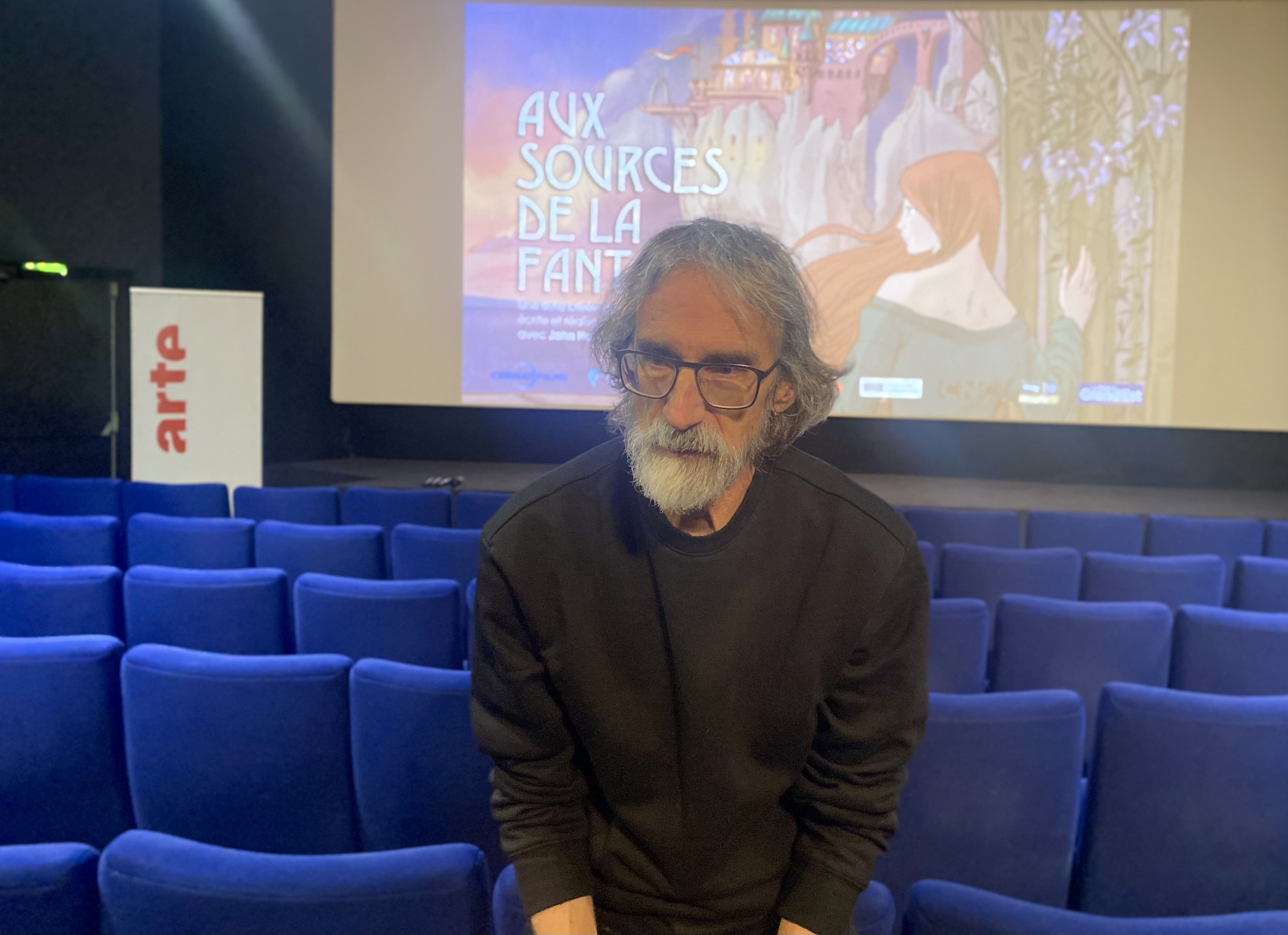
In Strasbourg, 2022

Howe has worked on projects including The Lord of the Rings, J.R.R. Tolkien's Books and Merchandise, Beowulf, Robin Hobb's books, The Lion, The Witch, and The Wardrobe, Cards for Magic: The Gathering, The Hobbit, Pan's Labyrinth. He has written and illustrated several children's books.

Howe and the Tolkien artist Alan Lee served as chief conceptual designers for Peter Jackson's The Lord of the Rings movie trilogy. Howe illustrated the Lord of the Rings board game created by Reiner Knizia, and re-illustrated the maps of The Lord of the Rings, The Hobbit, and The Silmarillion in 1996–2003. His work includes images of mythological material such as the Old English epic poem Beowulf (such as Knizia's board game Beowulf: The Legend). Howe illustrated many books in the fantasy genre, such as those by Robin Hobb. He contributed to the film adaptation of The Lion, the Witch, and the Wardrobe by C. S. Lewis, The Chronicles of Narnia. In 2005 a limited edition of George R. R. Martin's novel A Clash of Kings was released by Meisha Merlin, with numerous illustrations by Howe.

Howe has illustrated cards for the Magic: The Gathering collectible card game.

For The Hobbit films, original director Guillermo del Toro and replacement director Peter Jackson consulted with both Howe and fellow concept artist Alan Lee to ensure continuity of design.

Howe is a member of the living history group the Company of Saynt George, and has expertise in ancient and medieval armour and armaments.

Howe served as a concept designer for Amazon's 2022 The Lord of the Rings: The Rings of Power.

== Selected works ==
- The Fisherman & His Wife, transl. from Brothers Grimm (Mankato, Minnesota: Creative Education, 1983). ISBN 0871919370 — picture book
- The Enchanted World: Night Creatures (Time Life, 1985)
- The Enchanted World: Water Spirits (Time Life, 1985)
- The Enchanted World: Dwarfs (Time Life, 1985)
- The Enchanted World: Giants and Ogres (Time Life, 1985)
- Rip Van Winkle by Washington Irving, retold by John Howe (Little, Brown & Company, 1988) ISBN 0316375780
- Jack and the Beanstalk, retold by John Howe (Little, Brown & Company, 1989) ISBN 0316375799
- Knights: A 3-Dimensional Exploration (Tango Books, 1995) ISBN 978-1-85707-071-2
- The Knight With the Lion: The Story of Yvain (Little, Brown & Company, 1996) ISBN 978-0-316-37583-2
- A Diversity of Dragons by Anne McCaffrey with Richard Woods (Atheneum Books, 1997) ISBN 978-0-689-31868-9
- Images of Middle-Earth (HarperCollins, 2000) ISBN 978-0-261-10310-8
- The Maps of Tolkien's Middle-earth by Brian Sibley (Houghton Mifflin Harcourt, 2003) ISBN 978-0-618-39110-3
- The King of Winter's Daughter (Little, Brown & Company, 2005) ISBN 978-0-316-88837-0
- Fantasy Encyclopedia (Kingfisher, 2005)
- Wizardology: The Book of the Secrets of Merlin (Candlewick Press, 2005)
- Myth and Magic: The Art of John Howe (Barnes & Noble, 2006) ISBN 978-0-7607-8686-4
- Fantasy Art Workshop (Impact Books, 2007) ISBN 978-1-60061-009-7
- Forging Dragons: Inspirations, Approaches and Techniques for Drawing and Painting Dragons (David & Charles, 2008) ISBN 978-1-60061-323-4
- Fantasy Drawing Workshop (Impact Books, 2009) ISBN 978-1-60061-773-7
- Lost Worlds (Kingfisher, 2009) ISBN 978-0-7534-6107-5
- Cathedral (Caurette Editions, 2024) ISBN 978-2-38289-089-9

== See also ==
- Works inspired by J. R. R. Tolkien
