= Mary Fairburn =

English artist

Mary Fairburn (born 13 June 1933) is an English artist and musician, best known for her illustrations for The Lord of the Rings, by J. R. R. Tolkien, which in 1968 were seen and admired by the author. Her illustrations, unknown until 2012, were published as a body by HarperCollins in the Official Tolkien Calendar 2015. Fairburn has been living in Australia since 1976.

== Early life ==
Fairburn was born in London. She was educated at St Swithun's School, Winchester, the Winchester School of Art and the Institute of Education, University of London. In the mid-1950s, she taught art at St. Bonaventure's boys' school Forest Gate, east of London, and in 1958 took a job at Masjid-i-Sulieman, Iran, teaching art and music to the children of the employees of an American oil company. In 1957 and again in the early 1960s, she painted a number of (now destroyed) murals on religious subjects at St. Peter's primary school in Winchester. She travelled in Europe and Africa during 1962 to 1965. She returned to Winchester, and held a number of exhibitions.

== Illustrations of The Lord of the Rings ==
Detail of "The Pass on Mount Caradhras", 1968. Fairburn sent several illustrations to Tolkien; he was impressed, enough to think of an illustrated The Lord of the Rings.

In 1967 she left England, intending to drive across Europe and Asia to Australia, but had to turn back at the Indian border due to bureaucratic difficulties. She wintered in Teheran, where a friend was working for the British Council, and read his copy of Tolkien's Lord of the Rings. On her return to England, she executed a suite of pictures based on the novel, mainly in coloured ink, and in May 1968 sent them to Tolkien. He wrote back in strongly approving terms, telling Fairburn her pictures were "splendid. They are better pictures in themselves and also show far more attention to the text than any that have yet been submitted to me" (letter of 24 May 1968). In a subsequent letter, he wrote, "After seeing your specimens I am beginning to change my mind [that is, about not having The Lord of the Rings illustrated], and I think that an illustrated edition might be a good thing." However, soon after this, Tolkien broke his leg in a fall, and was hospitalised; Fairburn was in difficult financial circumstances and needed to urgently pursue more immediately rewarding work, and the Tolkien family home in Oxford was packed up for a move to the English south coast. As a result of these disruptions the negotiations between the writer and artist went no further.

== Later career ==
In 1968–70, she spent many months constructing and painting a set of Stations of the Cross, altar carvings, and a ceiling mural of the Holy Trinity, in the newly built St. Stephen's Catholic church, in the Winchester suburb of Oliver's Battery. Unable to find secure housing or employment, Fairburn left England in autumn 1974, and travelled through Asia, eventually settling in Melbourne, Australia, where she taught a range of courses for the Council for Adult Education, and met her second husband, Patrick Flegg. They retired in 1993 to Castlemaine, Victoria, where Fairburn continued painting, and also organised and played in a number of musical ensembles. She played mandolin and mandola on a CD recording, "Anduin: The Great River" (2001), by the band Odds and Sods, which featured the music of Patrick Currie Flegg.

In 2012, the story of her work for Tolkien was reported by literary scholar Paul Tankard, in the Times Literary Supplement. This led to her surviving Tolkien illustrations, with two newly-painted ones, being published by HarperCollins in the Official Tolkien Calendar 2015. Her young adult fantasy novel, Selangath: A Legend of the Sea, with her own illustrations, was self-published in 2019. In October 2020, her autobiography, Borne on the Wind: Memoirs of an Artist, was published. It includes many first-time reproductions, in colour, of art works from across her entire career. In 2021, she was the subject of a short film, "Mary Fairburn: Artist Musician Writer Universal Wanderer," by filmmaker Christine McCue.

== Exhibitions ==
Fairburn's art work has been exhibited in Winchester, Amantea (Italy), Melbourne and Castlemaine.
