= List of tabletop game fanzines =

This is a list of fanzines that focused on tabletop games.

== 0-9 ==
- 20 Years On/Twenty Years On - postal gaming

== A ==
- Abyss
- Acolyte - tabletop games (previously known as The Apocalypse) generally
- Adventurer's Anonymous [ed. Richard Stitson]
- Aerial Servant
- The AHIKS Kommandeur & European Newsletter
- Alarums and Excursions
- Alice [ed. Richard Campbell; re-launch of This Way Up]
- Alien Star
- All-Star Replay - US
- Amulet [ed. Richard Henderson with Alex Bardy]
- The Arbalest [ed. Paul Slusarewicz; Stormbringer, Call of Cthulhu, Dr. Who RPG, and other RPGs covered; not to be confused with the anarchist zine of the same name]
- The Argubusier
- Aslan
- Astradyne - postal games
- Atu XVIII [ed. Trevor Mendham; University of Warwick clubzine; FRP, discussion and dip-zine]

== B ==
- Backstabbers United Monthly [BUM] [ed. Malcolm Cornelius; started off as an En Garde and Diplomacy gamezine, with other RPGs added; 1988-]
- Balrog Banter
- Barbarous League
- The Bat
- Beaumains [ed. Gareth Jones; devoted to Pendragon RPG and things Arthurian]
- The Beholder
- Black Knight [ed. Angela Times]
- Black Rider
- Blood, Guts and Beer
- Blue Shaboo [ed. Brian Duguid; "rolegame" zine]
- Bohemian Rhapsody [ed. Malcolm Smith; RPG and dipzine]
- A Bolt from the Blue (was previously NMR!)
- Bone of Contention [ed. Steven Rawlinson & Fergus Selby]
- Boojum (was previously Chimaera)
- Booklet of Many Things
- Boris
- Borkelby's Folly [ed. Ray Gillham; Jorune RPG zine]
- Brian Dolton's Book of Flower Pressing
- Brick in the Face [ed. Fergus Selby]
- The Bubonic Plagiarist
- Burning Rubber

== C ==
- Campaign - wargame magazine
- Carnel - UK fanzine started in 1994
- Cassandra [ed. Anthony Bourke & Damien Maddalena; RPG chat zine with diplomacy waiting lists; 8 issues, Sept 1985 - Aug 1986]
- Centurian ["sequel" to Blue Shaboo #2]
- Cerebreton [ed. Alex Bardy, mostly SF RPGs]
- Chaos Lord
- CHARGE! - miniature wargaming newsletter / fanzine published quarterly for American Civil War gamers
- Cheader's Digest - Canadian
- Cheesehole News - board wargames
- Chimaera
- The Church Mouse
- Citizens of Grenada [ed. Andrew Meek]
- Clobbering Time!
- Codpiece [ed. Ralph Horsley, 10+ issues, originally Convert or Die]
- The Combat - board wargames
- Combat Is Glory
- Conflict Historical Study - board wargames
- Conflict of Chaos
- Controversial Repertoires of an Alcoholic Prat [ed. Bob Topley; 1985-?]
- Corrosive Comix Un-Ltd
- Crasimoff's World Newsletter
- Crimson Steel [ed. Andy Warner, one issue]
- Cruel Worlds [ed. M. Donkersley; 1985-?]
- Crystal Ball
- Cult of Anubis [ed. N.J. Booth]
- Cut & Thrust

== D ==
- D&D Fortnightly
- Dagon
- Dankendismal - early D&D fanzine from the 1970s
- Danse Macabre - postal games
- Dark Elf
- Daughters of Dool [ed. Bob Jackson; RPG and perzine]
- Dead Elf
- Deck of Many Things
- Death's Dance Taken Slowly [ed. Brian Dolton,?13 issues, RPG theory]
- Delusions of Grandeur [ed. Nathan Cubitt, with Mike Blake & Paul Duncanson; 1988-1995, 4 issues plus a one shot, compilation "Best Of" published in 2002 and edited Robert Rees of "Carnal"]
- Demon Issue
- Demon's Blood
- Demon's Drawl
- Descending Darkness
- Destiny [ed. E. Rackstraw; SF RPGs]
- Dib, Dib, Dib - postal games
- The Dice Bag
- Die Rubezahl (was previously Monsterous Perversion)
- Dig My Dogma [ed. Mark Wisher]
- Dispatch It
- Dolchstoss - Dippy zine
- Don't Shoot Me I'm Only The Diplomacy Player
- DOOL [ed. Bob Jackson; formerly Daughters of DOOL]
- Doombook of Chaos
- Doomed Dwarves Journal [ed. Gavin White]
- Dragon Roar
- Dragon's Breath [ed. Warren Barnes]
- Dragonfields
- Dragonfire
- DragonLords
- Dragonlore [Alexander Hildyard, at least 6 issues]
- Dross
- Drune Kroll
- drunk & disorderly
- The Dungeoneer [ed. Charles Anshell, early US prozine with wide UK distribution]
- Durin's Bane [ed.?, 1986-?]

== E ==
- EdgeWork
- Eh? [ed. Alex Bardy]
- Eidolon [ed. Mark Jones; Cthulhu & PBM Sopwith, etc.; successor to Sacrificing the Goat]
- Espana
- Europa - board wargames
- The Europa Newsletter
- Evermist
- Exeunt [ed. Ben Goodale]
- The Explorer
- Explosive Rune
- Eye of All Seeing Wonder [ed. Dave Morris; Tekumel & Empire of the Petal Throne]

== F ==
- F-Plan / Five Year Plan (was previously The Malkuth Scripts)
- Fantasia [ed. Gerard Birkhill; RPG reviews]
- Fantasia Today
- The Fantasy Herald
- Fantasy Tales
- Fantasy Tomb [ed. Andrew Thompson; ?1 issue]
- Faster Than Light (was previously JAWZ)
- Fat Knite [ed. Steve Blincoe]
- The Fiery Cross
- Filibuster - Dippy zine
- Fire and Water [ed. Andrew Hill]
- Fire the Arquebusiers!
- First Excursion (was previously Twiqu)
- First Strike [ed. M. Clarke]
- FIST [ed.?; short for *F*anzine L*ist*]
- Flame
- Flames of Albion
- Floating World [ed.?; FGU RPGs]
- Fractal Spectrum
- Fusions [ed. Warwick University SF&F Society, thoughtful RPG discussion]

== G ==
- Gallimaufray - Dippy zine
- Game News / Game Trade News
- Gamelog
- Gamer's Guide - gaming magazine first published in 1980 by Brian E. Carmody
- Gamers
- Games Gazette
- Games Review
- The Gamer's Connection
- Gamesmaster
- Gazfinc
- Glamdring
- Glarg [ed. Steven Hampson]
- Grav Gauss and Pods Rifles [RPG clubzine of York U. SF&F club; renamed "Grave Podes and Grouse Trifles" after issue 3]
- Greatest Hits - Dippy zine
- Grey Worlds
- Green Goblin
- Grim
- Grim Reaper
- Grimlord
- Ground Zero
- The Guilder

== H ==
- Hacking Times
- Harvest Time
- Hellfire [ed. A.S. Lilly]
- Herald - PBM games
- Hits to Kill
- Hocus Pocus
- Holy Avenger [ed.?, 1986-?]
- Home of the Brave
- Hopscotch
- The Horror Show
- Horse Manure [ed. S. Cooper, 1986-?]
- Hounds of Avalar
- Hyperactive [ed. Nick Edwards; APA Zine aimed at helping "Newcomers" to zine editing]

== I ==
- I Don't Wanna go Back in the Box [ed. John J. Smith]
- If
- Illusionist's Vision
- Imazine
- Immoral Minority [ed. P. Wilkinson]
- The Impaler
- Infernal Desire
- Inflammatory Material
- Instant Karma [ed. James Wallis]
- Intellect Devourer [ed. Dave Hughes]
- Interface
- Interim
- Into the Darkness [ed. Nick Price]
- Iron Orchid [ed. Nick Edwards, 8+ issues, RPG & PBMs]
- Iskra [ed. Tom Conway, music and RPG zine]
- IT
- It's Clobbering Time [eds. Andrew de Salis, Steve Weekes; superhero RPGs]
- Ivory, Peacocks and Apes [eds. Pete Lindsay and Gavin Greig started mid 1990s, 2 issues, on hiatus]
- Ivory Tower

== J ==
- JagdPanther
- JAWZ
- Journal of the Adulterated Sanity Role-Playing Gamers
- Journal of the Senseless Carnage Society

== K ==
- The Kommandeur - board wargames

== L ==
- Lankhmar Star Daily
- L'anno Del Topo
- The Last Province
- Lion & Lamb Chronicles [ed.?; Norwegian APA-zine with English contributors]
- Living the Orclife [ed. C.E. Nurse; less of a zine than a serialized RPG]
- Lokasenna
- Lone Warrior
- The Lords of Chaos

== M ==
- Mad Policy
- Major Thompson Lives in France
- Making Moves [ed. ?; Warhammer FRP, Call of Cthulhu and other RPGs]
- The Malkuth Scripts
- Manic Depressive
- The Martian Chronicles
- Masters of the Prime
- Megalomania - Dippy zine
- Mercurius Aulicus
- Military Enthusiast - board wargames
- Miniature Wargames
- Miser's Hoard
- Modern Heroes
- Moonscape
- Monochrome
- Monsterous Perversion
- Moranme Jobswurf
- Moronica Rlpsnore
- Morningstar - Australian zine
- Mouse Police
- My Father Killed a Man [ed. Jez Keen; one off zine, contains the Dreamscape-like RPG "Carnations and Razorblades"]
- Mystic Crystal

== N ==
- Necro-Worlds
- The Necromancer
- Necronomicon
- Nemesis [ed. Tim Hyde]
- Netherworld Continuum
- New Beholder
- New Fusions [University of Warwick SF & Fantasy Society clubzine]
- The New Zealand Wargamer
- News from Bree
- Next Stop Jupiter
- Night Dreams
- Night Voyages
- Nightflyer [ed.?; Oxford University RPG Society clubzine]
- NMR!
- Norst Claw
- Now Eat the Rabbit (was previously The Guilder)
- The Nugget

== O ==
- Obscurity Inc
- Obsidian Rex Quarterly [ed. P. Adams]
- Ode
- Oink
- Olympus
- The Oracle
- Oracle of Almost All Knowledge
- Orc Torc
- Orc's Revenge
- Out of the Mist
- Out of the Mist (combines Shadowfire and Mystic Crystal)
- Ovum - board wargames
- Owl and Weasel

== P ==
- Palantir
- Pandemonium [ed. M. de Monti; horror, comics, roleplaying]
- Pandemonium - US publication
- Panzerkreuser
- Party
- Pavic Tales [ed.?; Runequest 3rd edition fanzine]
- PBM
- Perfidious Albion
- Perchance [ed. Jim Johnston]
- Perspiring Dreams
- Pete Calcraft Fanclub Newsletter
- Pete Tamlyn Fanclub Newsletter
- Phanta Carta - fanzine published by Rick Krebs about 1970s Dungeon & Dragons campaigns
- Phantasy
- The Phantasy Network Newsletter
- Piland Bugle
- Polaris [ed. Simon Prest; 1 issue, 1987, Call of Cthulhu]
- Practical Wargamer
- Prisoners of War
- Protoplasm
- Psycho
- Psychobabble [Irish]
- Psychopath
- Punt & Pass
- Pursue & Destroy - board wargames
- Putty Riffo

== Q ==
- Quasits and Quasars
- Quick Quincy Gazette - US publication

== R ==
- Rage in Eden [ed. Richard Mumford]
- Rapscallion
- RCM [ed. Simon Ford, 1986-?]
- Read Pheasant Throughout [ed. Nick Eden; Runequest, roleplaying and comics]
- Red Fox
- Red Giant
- Red Shift [ed. Jez Keen, more of a perzine with creative writing and RPG ideas, one issue]
- Revolution
- Ringwraith's Shadow
- Ripping Yarns
- Role Call - list of British dippyzines and wargame zines
- Rolegaming
- Roleplayer
- Roleplaying [? ed. Joe Deckchair]
- The Roleplaying Karma Sutra
- Rostherne Games Review
- Die Rubezahl [ed. Pete Blanchard, sequel to Monstrous Perversion)
- Runeriter [ed. Neil Smith; Runequest RPG]
- Runestone
- Ryth Chronicle - from the US

== S ==
- Sacrificing The Goat
- Sarceen's Knowledge [ed.? 1 issue, Sky Realms of Jorune]
- Sauce of the Nile
- Scan
- School for Scandal
- The Scroll
- The Second Five Year Plan (was previously The Malkuth Scripts)
- Secrets of the Koan
- Seventh Sin of the Salamander [ed. Jonathan Laidlow]
- SEWARS
- Serendipity
- Shadowfire
- Shokwave
- Signal - Canadian
- Skullcrusher [ed. Richard Langrish and others; RPG hardware and other crunchy bits]
- Sleuth Times
- Slingshot
- Snot Rag [ed.?, 1987-?]
- The Sorcerer's Scrolls
- Sound & Fury
- Space Operations [ed. Brian Scott, Space Opera & other FGU games]
- Spawn of Chaos
- Spectral Visions
- Spit 4 [ed. D. Evens]
- Spitting From the Battlements
- Spreadsheet
- Stardate
- Starquester
- Stielkrieg
- The Storm Ruler
- Storm Lord
- The Stormlord - from the UK
- Strategic Reserve
- Superhero UK
- Swabbers
- Swansea With Me
- Swordplay

== T ==
- Take That You Fiend
- Tales From Tanelorn
- Tales of the Reaching Moon
- Tau Ceti Phoenix: Apocrypha
- Telegraph Road [ed. Jeremy Nuttall, formerly Demon's Drawl]
- Tempestuous Orifice
- Terror Tome
- The Thing that Came from the Dungheap [ed. Michael Duggan]
- This Way Up
- Thunderstruck
- Thunderwind
- TnT - Tunnels & Trolls fanzine that was published by Ken St. Andre
- Tome of Horrors
- Torturers Apprentice
- Totally Zane [ed. Linda Little, mostly perzine, with some PBM and RPGs]
- Tragsnart [ed. Jon ?; subzine in Dool, and others; and also an online version with reviews of other vintage zines]
- Trizine
- Trojan Horse [ed. Andy Evans, diplomacy zine with D&D chat]
- Trollcrusher
- TTYF International
- Twinworld [ed. Mike Straaten, AD&D and Traveller]
- TWIQU

== U ==
- Ultimatum [ed. Thomas Lynton]
- Underworld Oracle
- Utter Drivel [ed. Gordon McLellan with Ben Goodale; #12+1 is a joint zine with the editor of "Moronica Ripsnore"]

== V ==
- Vacuous Grimoire
- Variant
- Verbal Diarrhoea
- Vienna
- VIP of Gaming
- Voom Vat

== W ==
- Walamalaysia Gazette
- The Wanderer
- The War Machine
- Wargame News
- Warped Sense of Humor [ed. Julie Glig]
- Weirdbook
- Wereman [ed. James Wallis; 9 issues, 1982-84, RPG hardware, first published works by James Wallis & Spike Y Jones]
- The Westron [ed.?; news of a D&D postal campaign]
- White Elephant [ed.?; Irish, sequel to The Guilder]
- White Rabbit [ed. Maurice Thomas]
- White Shadow
- The Wild Hunt - from the US
- The Wind's Third Quarter The Wind's Sixth Quarter The Wind's Ninth Quarter
- Wolvesbane [ed. Jon French; AD&D]
- The World Builder
- Wotsit
- The Writings of a Converted Wraith
- Wyrm's Claw
- Wyrm's Footnotes
- Wyrmfire

== X ==
- XATAXOMBE

== Y ==
- Year of the Rat

== Z ==
- Zadragorzette
- Zeppelin - Canadian magazine
- Zine To Be Believed

== See also ==
- List of tabletop game magazines
