= List of British role-playing zines =

This is a list of zines published in the United Kingdom that focused on role-playing games.

== A ==
- Alien Star
- Aslan

== B ==
- The Beholder

== C ==
- Chimaera

== D ==
- Dead Elf
- Demon's Drawl
- DragonLords

== F ==
- The Fiery Cross

== G ==
- Green Goblin

== J ==
- Journal of the Senseless Carnage Society

== L ==
- The Last Province

== M ==
- Miser's Hoard

== N ==
- News from Bree

== O ==
- Owl and Weasel

== T ==
- Tales of the Reaching Moon
- Trollcrusher

== V ==
- Vacuous Grimoire

== See also ==
- List of tabletop game fanzines
