= List of tabletop game magazines =

This is a list of magazines that focused on tabletop games.

== A ==
- Adventure Gaming
- Adventurer (1986 - 1987)
- Adventurers Club
- Albion
- The American Wargamer
- The Apprentice
- Arcane
- Ares
- Australian Realms
- Autoduel Quarterly

== B ==
- Backstab
- Battle Games in Middle-earth
- Battleplan
- BattleTechnology
- Berg's Review of Games
- The Boardgamer
- Breakout

== C ==
- The Canadian Wargaming Journal
- Captain's Log
- Casus Belli
- Challenge
- Citadel Compendium
- The Courier

== D ==
- d8 (magazine)
- Dankendismal - early D&D fanzine from the 1970s
- Different Worlds
- Dragon
- The Duelist
- Dungeon

== E ==
- Elder Tunnels
- Envoyer (German)
- The Excellent Prismatic Spray

== F ==
- Fantasy Gamer (1983 - 1984)
- Fantasy Modeling
- Far Traveller
- Fictional Reality
- Fire & Movement
- For Your Eyes Only

== G ==
- Game Merchant
- The Gamer's Connection
- Games
- Games & Puzzles
- Games International (1988 - 1990)
- Games Unplugged
- Games World of Puzzles
- GamesMaster Catalog
- GamesMaster International
- GM
- The General
- The Grenadier

== H ==
- Heroes Magazine
- High Passage

== I ==
- Imagine
- Inferno!
- Inquisitor
- InQuest Gamer
- Interactive Fantasy
- Interplay

== J ==
- JagdPanther
- Jeux & Strategie (French)
- The Journal of Tékumel Affairs
- Journal of the Travellers Aid Society
- The Journal of World War II Wargaming

== K ==
- Knights of the Dinner Table Magazine
- Knucklebones
- Kobold Quarterly

== L ==
- Little Wars
- Living Greyhawk Journal

== M ==
- Magia i Miecz
- Moves

== N ==
- Nexus: The Gaming Connection

== O ==
- Operations

== P ==
- Panzer Digest
- Panzerfaust Magazine
- Paper Wars
- Pegasus
- Phoenix
- Playthings
- Polyhedron
- Polymancer
- Pyramid

== R ==
- Richard Berg's Review of Games
- The Rifter
- Roleplayer

== S ==
- Scrye
- Shadis
- Shrapnel: The Official BattleTech Magazine
- The Sideboard
- The Space Gamer
- The Strategic Review
- Strategy & Tactics

== T ==
- Tortured Souls

== U ==
- The Unspeakable Oath

== V ==
- Valkyrie

== W ==
- The Wargamer
- Wargamer's Digest
- Wargames Illustrated
- Warlock
- Warpstone
- White Dwarf
- White Wolf

== See also ==
- List of tabletop game fanzines
