= Works inspired by Tolkien =

The works of J. R. R. Tolkien have served as the inspiration to painters, musicians, film-makers and writers, to such an extent that he is sometimes seen as the "father" of the entire genre of high fantasy.

Do not laugh! But once upon a time (my crest has long since fallen) I had a mind to make a body of more or less connected legend, ranging from the large and cosmogonic to the level of romantic fairy-story... The cycles should be linked to a majestic whole, and yet leave scope for other minds and hands, wielding paint and music and drama. Absurd.

— J. R. R. Tolkien

== Art and illustration ==
Tolkien found Horus Engels' 1946 illustrations for the German edition of The Hobbit too "Disnified": he disliked both "Bilbo with a dribbling nose, and Gandalf as a figure of vulgar fun".

The earliest illustrations of Tolkien's works were drawn by the author himself. The 1937 American edition of The Hobbit was illustrated by professional draughtsmen. Tolkien was very critical of this work, and in 1946 he rejected illustrations by Horus Engels for the German edition of the Hobbit as "too 'Disnified' for my taste: Bilbo with a dribbling nose, and Gandalf as a figure of vulgar fun rather than the Odinic wanderer that I think of".

In 1948, Milein Cosman was invited by Tolkien's publishers to submit illustrations for Farmer Giles of Ham. Tolkien felt her impressionistic style did not suit the story, and she was replaced by Pauline Baynes, who later also supplied the illustrations for The Adventures of Tom Bombadil (1962) and Smith of Wootton Major (1967). In 1968, Tolkien was sent part of a suite of illustrations of The Lord of the Rings, mostly in coloured ink, by the English artist Mary Fairburn; Tolkien said of her pictures: "They ... show far more attention to the text than any that have yet been submitted to me.... I am beginning to ... think that an illustrated edition might be a good thing." For various reasons the project went no further, and Fairburn's illustrations were unknown until 2012. Princess Margrethe (now Queen Margrethe II) of Denmark, an accomplished and critically acclaimed painter, was inspired to create illustrations to The Lord of the Rings in the early 1970s. In 1977, Queen Margrethe's drawings were published in the Danish translation of the book, redrawn by the British artist Eric Fraser.

A very large Gollum in Tove Jansson's illustration for the 1962 Swedish translation of The Hobbit, given that Tolkien had not said how large Gollum was

Tim and Greg Hildebrandt, usually called the Brothers Hildebrandt, were Tolkien illustrators in the 1970s, known especially for their Middle-earth calendars. The British artist Jimmy Cauty created a best-selling poster of The Lord of the Rings (1976) and The Hobbit (1980) for the retailer Athena.

Well-known Tolkien illustrators of the 1990s and 2000s are John Howe, Alan Lee, and Ted Nasmith — Lee for illustrated editions of The Hobbit and The Lord of the Rings, Nasmith for illustrated editions of The Silmarillion, and Howe for the cover artwork to several Tolkien publications. Howe and Lee worked as concept artists in the creation of Peter Jackson's film trilogy. In 2004, Lee won an Academy Award for Best Art Direction on the film The Lord of the Rings: The Return of the King.

Other artists who have found inspiration in Tolkien's works include Inger Edelfeldt who illustrated the covers of Swedish translations of several of his books, Anke Eißmann, Michael Hague, Tove Jansson (of Moomin fame, illustrator of Swedish and Finnish translations of The Hobbit), Paul Raymond Gregory, Tim Kirk, Angus McBride who illustrated Iron Crown's Tolkien-based role-playing games, Jef Murray, Colleen Doran, Jenny Dolfen who has made watercolour paintings of scenes from The Silmarillion, Alexander Korotich, who made a series of scraperboard engravings of The Lord of the Rings, and Peter Xavier Price. Works of several of these artists were exhibited in an "Images of Middle-earth" exhibition of some 170 artworks organised by Davide Martini of the Greisinger Museum of Switzerland; it toured Italy between 2003 and 2005.

== Film ==
The 2005–2010 Narnia film trilogy adapted from the novel series by Tolkien's friend C. S. Lewis were produced due to the popularity of The Lord of the Rings. George R. R. Martin acknowledged that Tolkien influenced his 2011–2019 Game of Thrones TV series and novels about medieval fantasy, while speaking about a movie about Tolkien's life.

An early draft for George Lucas's 1977 Star Wars film is said to have included an exchange of dialogue between Obi-Wan Kenobi and Luke Skywalker taken directly from the conversation between Gandalf and Bilbo in Chapter 1 of The Hobbit, where Bilbo/Kenobi says "Good morning!" and Gandalf/Luke replies asking whether he means he's having a good morning, or is wishing him one, or that all mornings are good. Bilbo/Kenobi answers "All of them at once". The plagiarised dialogue was dropped, but Lucas modelled the monk-like Kenobi on Gandalf; the film author Chris Taylor identifies several further elements of Star Wars that in his view could have been modelled on Middle-earth.

Chris Taylor's comparison of Star Wars with The Lord of the Rings
Element	Star Wars 1977	The Lord of the Rings 1954–55
Wise old man	Obi-Wan Kenobi sacrifices himself fighting Darth Vader, then guides Luke through the Force	Gandalf dies saving Fellowship from the Balrog, then guides Frodo telepathically
Innocent protagonists	R2-D2 and C-3PO, carrying stolen data tapes, supported by the team	Frodo and Sam, carrying the One Ring, supported by the Fellowship
"Hellish war machine"	Death Star	Mordor
Enemy troops	Stormtroopers	Orcs
Evil wizard	Grand Moff Tarkin	Saruman
Dark Lord	Darth Vader	Sauron

While working on a Star Wars animated series, Dave Filoni noted that Peter Jackson visited him and his mentor George Lucas to discuss Tolkien's works and to ask for advice. According to the Star Wars website, Darth Vader is compared by Filoni to the Balrog rather than Sauron, and the Prancing Pony bar may have inspired the Mos Eisley cantina, the introduction of Han Solo suggestively matching that of Strider (Aragorn). As for the prequel trilogy, it notes that Saruman influenced Count Dooku, and volcanic Mordor, whether Tolkien's or Jackson's, influenced the volcanic planet Mustafar.

== Literature ==
=== Fantasy ===
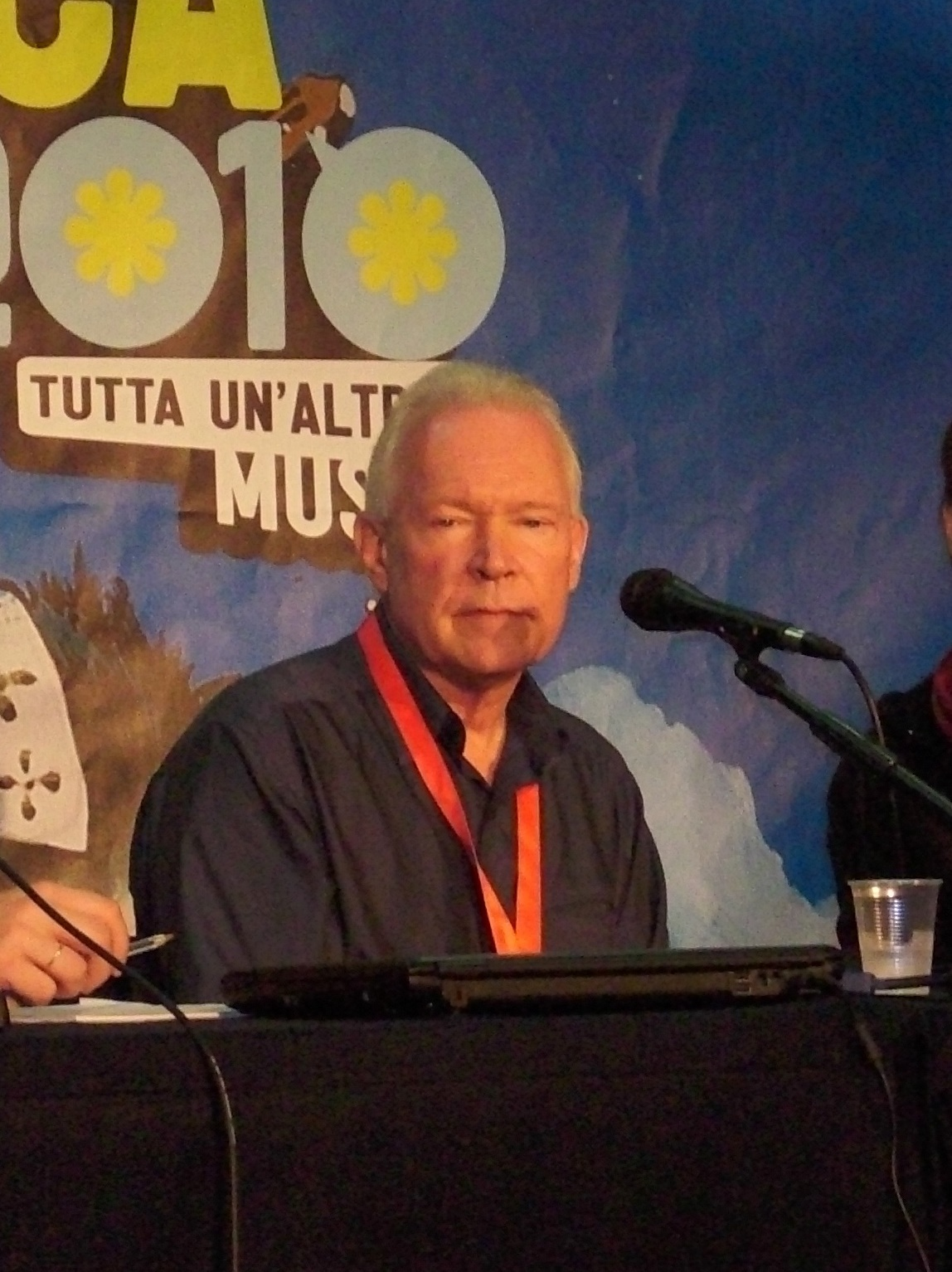
Fantasy writer Terry Brooks was influenced by Tolkien.

As early as 1984, Diana Paxson argued in Mythlore that Tolkien had founded a new literary tradition. Since then, many authors have found inspiration in Tolkien's work. Following the success of The Hobbit and The Lord of the Rings in the 1960s, publishers were quick to try to meet a new demand for literate fantasy in the American marketplace.

Ursula Le Guin's Earthsea series, beginning with A Wizard of Earthsea in 1968, was one of the first fantasy series influenced by Tolkien. (Note: The Tolkien scholar John Garth writes that Tolkien's name appears to be hidden in the small amount of the Hardic language of Earthsea in The Wizard of Earthsea. "Sea" is sukien, from suk, "foam", and inien, "feather". "Rock", the material of earth, is "tolk", so, he suggests, the Hardic for "Earthsea" would be Tolkien, for tolk + inien on the same pattern as sukien. Garth suggests that this is a tribute to Tolkien, tolk being the first word of the "Old Speech" that she names, and the first to be handed down both by the Wizard Ged to Tenar in The Tombs of Atuan, and by Tenar to her daughter in Tehanu.) Among the Tolkienian archetypes in the Earthsea books are wizards (including the protagonist, Ged), a disinherited prince (Arren in The Farthest Shore), a magical ring (the ring of Erreth-Akbe in The Tombs of Atuan), a Middle-earth style quest (in The Farthest Shore), and powerful dragons (like the dragon of Pendor, in A Wizard of Earthsea).

Patricia A. McKillip's The Forgotten Beasts of Eld and Jane Yolen's The Magic Three of Solatia were Tolkien-inspired fantasies for young adults written in the mid-1970s. Ballantine, under the direction of editor Lin Carter, published public domain and relatively obscure works under the banner of the Ballantine Adult Fantasy series, aimed at adult readers who enjoyed Tolkien's works. Lester del Rey, however, sought for new books that would mirror Tolkien's work, and published Terry Brooks' The Sword of Shannara, David Eddings's Belgariad, and Stephen R. Donaldson's The Chronicles of Thomas Covenant, the Unbeliever. Guy Gavriel Kay, who had assisted Christopher Tolkien with the editing of The Silmarillion, later wrote his own Tolkien-influenced fantasy trilogy, The Fionavar Tapestry, complete with dwarfs and mages. Dennis L. McKiernan's Silver Call duology was intended to be a direct sequel to The Lord of the Rings but had to be altered. The Iron Tower trilogy, highly influenced by Tolkien's books, was then written as backstory. Fantasy series such as Terry Pratchett's Discworld and Orson Scott Card's The Tales of Alvin Maker were "undoubtedly" influenced by Tolkien.

Due to a loophole in Russian copyright law, Russian writers were able to publish fantasy novels set in Tolkien's Arda. Nick Perumov's The Ring of Darkness (Russian Кольцо Тьмы) takes place after the events of The Lord of the Rings.

From 1980, the term "fantasy" became synonymous with the general aspects of Tolkien's work: multiple races including dwarves and elves, a quest to destroy a magical artifact, often a medievalist aesthetic, and an evil that seeks to control the world. The plot of Pat Murphy's 1999 There and Back Again intentionally mirrors that of The Hobbit, but is transposed into a science-fiction setting involving space travel. J. K. Rowling's Harry Potter series has been seen as having been influenced by Tolkien's work; in particular, the wizard Dumbledore has been described as partially inspired by Tolkien's Gandalf. S.M. Stirling's "Emberverse" series, published starting in 2004, includes a character obsessed with The Lord of the Rings who creates a post-apocalyptic community based upon the Elves and Dúnedain of Middle-earth. The same plot point was used by the Russian writer Vladimir Berezin in his novel Road Signs (from the Universe of Metro 2033). Stephen King, best known as a horror writer, has acknowledged Tolkien's influence on his novel The Stand as well as his fantasy series The Dark Tower. Other prominent fantasy writers including George R. R. Martin, Michael Swanwick, Raymond E. Feist, Poul Anderson, Karen Haber, Harry Turtledove, Charles De Lint, and Orson Scott Card have acknowledged Tolkien's work as an inspiration.

=== Graphic novels ===
The cartoonist Jeff Smith was influenced by Tolkien, and the mythologies that inspired his works. He has characterized his epic 1,300-page graphic novel Bone as "Bugs Bunny meets The Lord of the Rings. It's a really long fairy tale with some fantasy elements but a lot of comedy."

== Parody ==
The first commercially published parody of Tolkien's work was the 1969 Bored of the Rings, by The Harvard Lampoon. The BBC produced a parody radio serial, Hordes of the Things, in 1980. The Last Ringbearer is a 1999 fantasy novel by the palaeontologist Kirill Eskov in the form of a parallel novel showing the war from the perspective of the people of Sauron's land of Mordor, under the notion that the original is a "history written by the victors".

The American comedian and TV show host Stephen Colbert incorporated Tolkien material in his commentary and sketches on both The Colbert Report and The Late Show. A film spin-off parody, Darrylgorn, featured Jackson and film trilogy actors including Elijah Wood, inspired by Colbert's cameo in The Hobbit: The Desolation of Smaug.

== Radio plays ==
Three radio plays based on The Lord of the Rings have been made, broadcast in 1955–1956, 1979 and 1981 respectively. The first and last ones were produced by the BBC. Tolkien heavily criticised the 1955-56 production.

== Music ==
Numerous songs and other musical works, in a wide range of idioms, have been inspired by Tolkien's fiction.

=== Hard rock and heavy metal ===
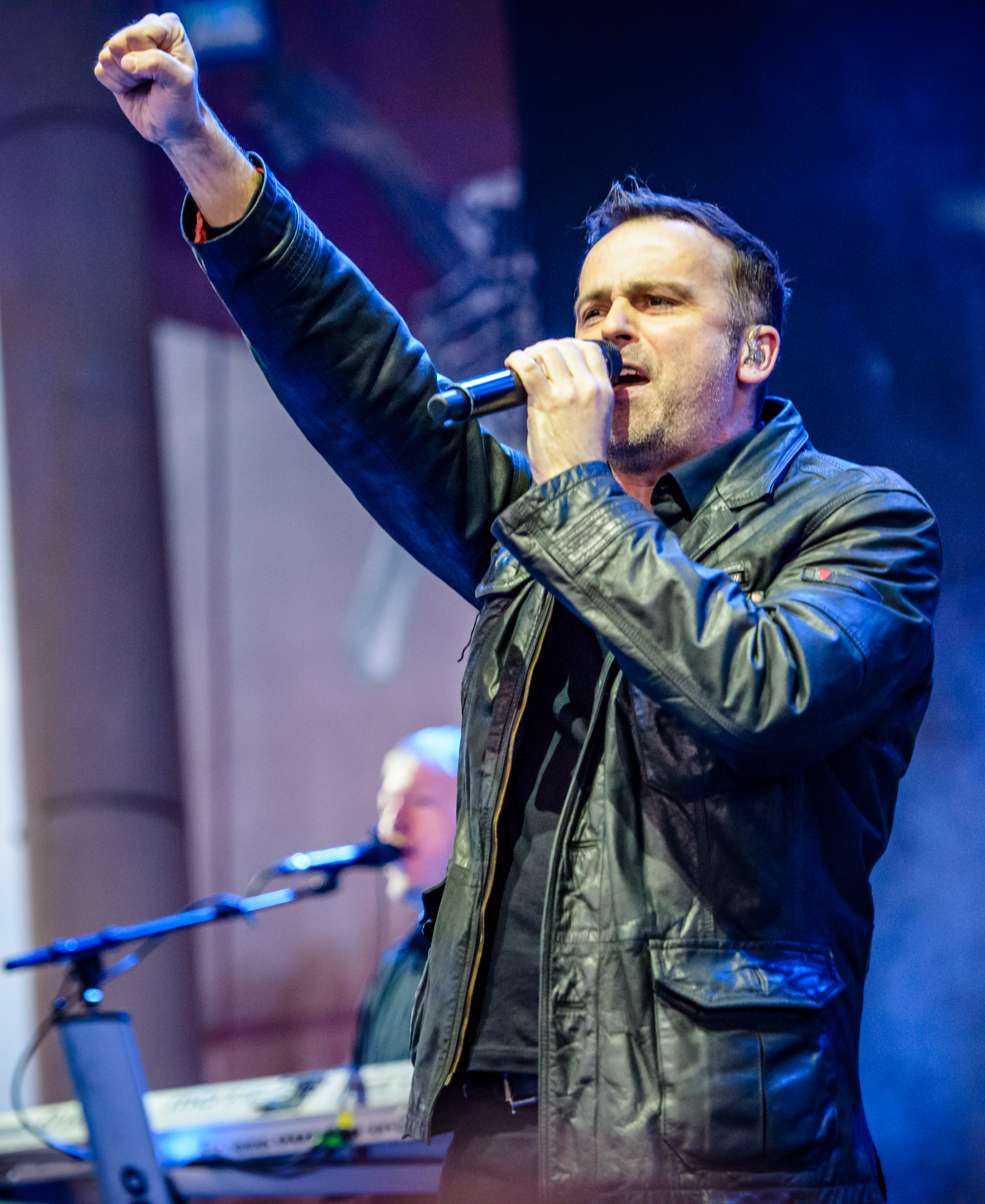
Hansi Kürsch, the Blind Guardian vocalist and lyrics writer, composed many songs about Middle-earth

Jack Bruce wrote a song called "To Isengard" on his first solo album "Songs for a Tailor" (1969).

Progressive rock acts which have composed songs based on Tolkien's characters and stories include Rush ("Rivendell"), Camel ("Nimrodel", "The White Rider"), Mostly Autumn (Music Inspired by The Lord of the Rings CD, 2001), Glass Hammer (The Middle-Earth Album, 2001), Bo Hansson (Music Inspired by Lord of the Rings, 1970), and the indie rock band Gatsbys American Dream.

The hard rock and classic metal band Led Zeppelin wrote several songs inspired by Tolkien's works including "The Battle of Evermore", "Misty Mountain Hop", "Ramble On", and "Over the Hills and Far Away" (with debate about some parts of "Stairway to Heaven"). Tom Rapp set most of The Verse of the One Ring ("Three Rings for the Elven-kings under the sky...") to music as "Ring Thing" in Pearls Before Swine's second album, Balaklava (1968). Bob Catley, lead singer of the British prog rock band Magnum, released a solo album titled Middle Earth. Punk quartet Thrice released a song called "The Long Defeat" about Tolkien's philosophies. The East Texas-based rock band Hobbit has produced multiple albums inspired by Tolkien's work.

Among the heavy metal artists influenced by Tolkien are Blind Guardian, who composed numerous songs relating to Middle-earth, including the whole of the concept album Nightfall in Middle Earth, based on The Silmarillion. The album was "adored" by fans of Tolkien and metal, but despised as escapist by grunge fans.

Many black metal bands, at least 85 specifically, out of 151 "metal bands" in a 2015 search, have made use of Middle-earth themes in their lyrics, artwork, and band names. One such is Black Breath, named for the terror-inducing Black Breath of the Nazgûl.

The symphonic black metal band Summoning states that most of its songs are based on Middle-Earth, with focus on the orcs and dark forces. Battlelore's lyrics are about Middle-earth characters and events in The Lord of the Rings and The Silmarillion, as well as medieval literature and the Kalevala, as is their pseudo-medieval stage show, in which each member is dressed as "ferocious warriors", "dirty thieves" or "beautiful female elves". The Italian group Ainur (named for Tolkien's Ainur) released Middle-earth themed albums named Children of Hurin (2007) and Lay of Leithian (2009).

Bands and musicians who have used Tolkien's legendarium for their stage names include the progressive rock band Marillion (from The Silmarillion). Gorgoroth take their name from an area of Mordor, Burzum take their name from the Black Speech of Mordor, Cirith Ungol take their name from the pass on the western path of Mordor, the dwelling of the spider Shelob and Amon Amarth take their name after an alternative name for Mount Doom. Lead singer of Dimmu Borgir, Shagrath, takes his stage name from The Lord of the Rings, after an orc captain.

=== Jazz ===
Australian jazz musician and composer, John Sangster, made six albums of musical responses to Tolkien's work. He recorded The Hobbit Suite (1973, Swaggie Records – S1340), and Double Vibe: Hobbit (1977); the first of these, with a selection from the second, was released on CD in 2002 (Swaggie CD 404). The later four double albums, The Lord of the Rings: A Musical Interpretation, v. 1, 2 and 3 (1975–77), and Landscapes of Middle-earth (1978), have been re-released on CD, 2002-06: Move Records MD 3251, 3252, 3253, and 3254.

=== Folk ===
Sally Oldfield's first solo album, Water Bearer (1978) was inspired by Tolkien's works, particularly "Songs of the Quendi", which quote from his poems.

The folk group The Hobbitons, part of the Dutch chapter of the Tolkien Society, released a CD in 1996 with 16 tracks of settings of Tolkien's poems.

The Irish singer Enya contributed a song "May it Be" for The Fellowship of the Ring (2001) movie soundtrack. It was nominated for the Academy Award for Best Original Song. She released a song entitled "Lothlórien", on her 1991 album Shepherd Moons.

In 2001, bluegrass and anti-folk artist Chris Thile released an instrumental album titled Not All Who Wander Are Lost, referencing Gandalf's words to Bilbo and Bilbo's poem about Aragorn. One of the songs on the album is "Riddles in the Dark", sharing the title of one of the chapters in The Hobbit. The Celtic foursome Broceliande's album The Starlit Jewel sets to music selected songs by Tolkien. Other folk rock and new age musicians inspired by Tolkien include Za Frûmi (singing in Orkish), Nickel Creek, David Arkenstone and Lyriel, among others. The Spanish Neoclassical Dark Wave band Narsilion derived its name from Tolkien's song "Narsilion" about the creation of the Sun and Moon.

=== Classical / film score ===
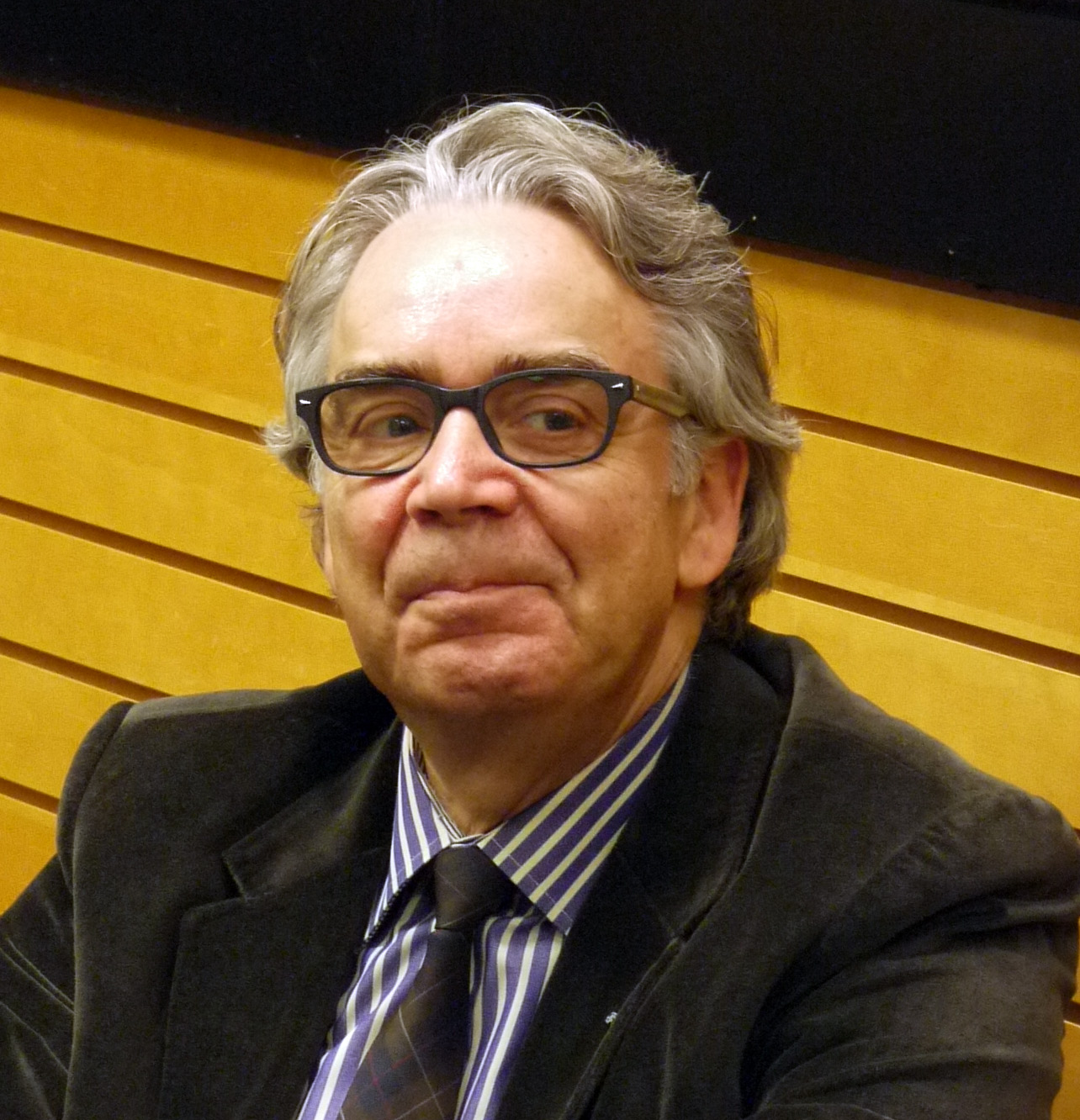
Howard Shore composed the music for the film trilogy The Lord of the Rings.

Donald Swann set music in the British art-song tradition to a collection of seven of Tolkien's lyrics and poems, published as The Road Goes Ever On. The work was approved by Tolkien himself, who collaborated on the published book, to which he provided notes and commentary. The songs were recorded by William Elvin (bass-baritone) with Swann on piano, and released in 1967 on an LP by Caedmon Records.

The Norwegian classical composer Martin Romberg has written three full-scale symphonic poems, Quendi (2008), Telperion et Laurelin (2014), and Fëanor (2017), inspired by passages from the Silmarillion. The works were premiered in Southern France. Romberg has also set Tolkien's Elven language poems to music in his work "Eldarinwë Liri" for girls' choir. The work premiered in 2010 with the Norwegian Girls Choir and Trio Mediæval at the Vestfold International Festival.

Johan de Meij's Symphony No. 1, "The Lord of the Rings", for concert band, is in five movements, each illustrating a personage or an important episode from the novel: Gandalf, Lothlorien, Gollum, Journey in the Dark (The Mines of Moria /The Bridge of Khazad-Dum), and Hobbits. The symphony was written between March 1984 and December 1987, and was premièred in Brussels on 15 March 1988. It has been recorded four times, including in an orchestral version, orchestrated by Henk de Vlieger. It won Sudler Composition Award in 1989.

Jacqueline Clarke's setting Tinuviel (1983), for countertenor solo, SATB choir, and piano accompaniment has been published in score.

Leonard Rosenman composed music for the Ralph Bakshi animated movie, while Howard Shore composed the music of The Lord of the Rings film series.

Paul Godfrey has written a large number of works based on Tolkien, the most significant of which is the four-evening cycle on The Silmarillion but also including three operas based on The Lord of the Rings: Tom Bombadil (one act), The Black Gate is closed (three acts) and The Grey Havens. as well as several sets of songs. His third symphony, Ainulindalë, is based on the opening chapter of The Silmarillion, and there is a half-hour setting of The Lay of Eärendil based on Bilbo's song at Rivendell. Godfrey released a full-cast demo of his planned 15+ hour Lord of the Rings opera in 2025 with the Welsh recording company Volante Opera Productions.

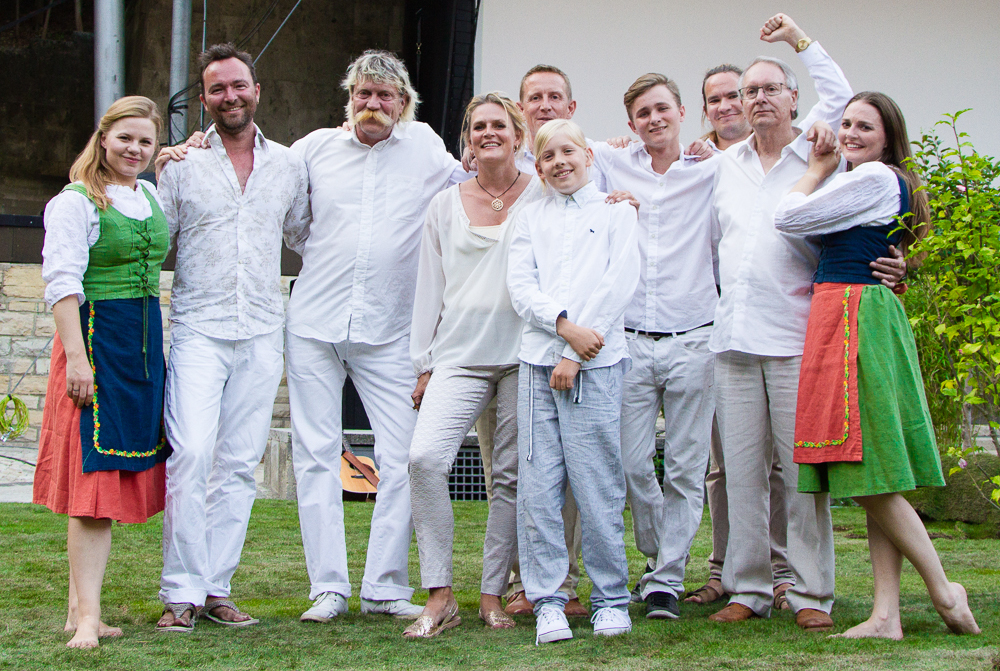
The Tolkien Ensemble have published their settings of all the poems in The Lord of the Rings on CDs.

The Tolkien Ensemble published four CDs from 1997 to 2005 with the aim to create "the world's first complete musical interpretation of the poems and songs from The Lord of the Rings". The project was given approval by both the Tolkien Estate and HarperCollins Publishers. Queen Margrethe II of Denmark gave permission to use her illustrations in the CD layout.

Aulis Sallinen, one of the leading classical music composers of Finland, composed his Seventh Symphony named "The Dreams of Gandalf" in 1996, from music initially meant to accompany a ballet.

The Australian musician, Patrick Flegg, late husband of Tolkien illustrator Mary Fairburn, composed a piano suite, Anduin: The Mighty River, recorded by Wendy Rowlands (2001).

The Canadian composer Glenn Buhr has written a three-movement tone poem Beren and Lúthien which he has recorded with the Winnipeg Symphony Orchestra as part of his CD Winter Poems.

== Games ==
Many model-based games, trading card games, board games and video games are set in Middle-earth, most depicting scenes and characters from The Lord of the Rings. In a broader sense, many fantasy role-playing games such as Dungeons & Dragons (D&D) and DragonQuest feature Tolkienesque creatures and were influenced by Tolkien's works. The Legend of Zelda was inspired by The Lord of the Rings books, as were other dungeon crawler and action-adventure games. The books themselves have been reproduced in video game form repeatedly, though without necessarily reflecting the power of Tolkien's storytelling.

Early miniature wargames include The Ringbearer (1975). Games Workshop have made The Lord of the Rings Strategy Battle Game (2001), which, while part of the film trilogy's merchandise, combines elements from both the books and films.

Early board games included Battle of Five Armies (1975) and the series of Middle Earth Games from Simulations Publications, Inc. in 1977, containing the games War of the Ring (strategic, covering all three books), Gondor (tactical, covering the siege of Minas Tirith) and Sauron (covering the decisive battle of the Second Age). More recent games include a game simply entitled Lord of the Rings (2000) and War of the Ring (2004, strategic, covering all three books).

Among role-playing and card games based on Middle-earth, Iron Crown Enterprises made Middle-earth Role Playing game (1982–1999) and Middle-earth Collectible Card Game (1995–1999). Decipher, Inc. created The Lord of the Rings Trading Card Game (2001) and The Lord of the Rings Roleplaying Game (2002), both based on the Jackson films. The Lord of the Rings: The Card Game (2011) is made by Fantasy Flight Games under their "Living Card Game" line. Adventures in Middle-earth (2016) is a D&D-compatible role-playing game released by Cubicle 7.

== Fan works ==
The first piece of Middle-earth fan fiction was published in 1959. Fanzines started to be produced soon after Tolkien fans formed "The Fellowship of the Ring" on 4 September 1960 at the Pittsburgh Worldcon. That group's magazine was I Palantir, edited by Ted Johnstone. Its British members had their own fanzine, Nazgul's Bane. Ed Meskys published his science fiction fanzine Niekas from 1962, including at least one piece on Tolkien per issue. By 1964, there were dozens of Tolkien fanzines across the US, and several in England. In 1969, Glen GoodKnight founded Mythlore as the fanzine of his Mythopoeic Society. Always serious, it transformed into a peer-reviewed journal in 1999. The Winter 1976 issue of Evermist was a special Tolkien edition, in a fanzine not otherwise dedicated to his work.

Broadening Internet access and a surge of interest driven by the Jackson films resulted in the production of a large amount of Tolkien fan fiction and Tolkien artwork in online communities, beginning in the early 2000s. Tolkien-inspired fan works include the fan films The Hunt for Gollum and Born of Hope, the novel The Last Ringbearer, and over 80,000 others listed in 2022. In 2004, sites for Tolkien-derived works were estimated to be 10% of all fan fiction websites, and, in 2019, Tolkien fan fiction was one of the most popular categories for works based on books on both Archive of Our Own and FanFiction.net.

The study of Middle-earth fan works has been largely neglected by Tolkien scholars and fan studies scholars alike. Many studies have been qualitative, focusing on a few selected fan works.

== See also ==
- List of things named after J. R. R. Tolkien and his works

== Sources ==
- Carpenter, Humphrey, ed. (2023) [1981]. The Letters of J. R. R. Tolkien: Revised and Expanded Edition. New York: HarperCollins. ISBN 978-0-35-865298-4.
