= Tolkien's impact on fantasy =

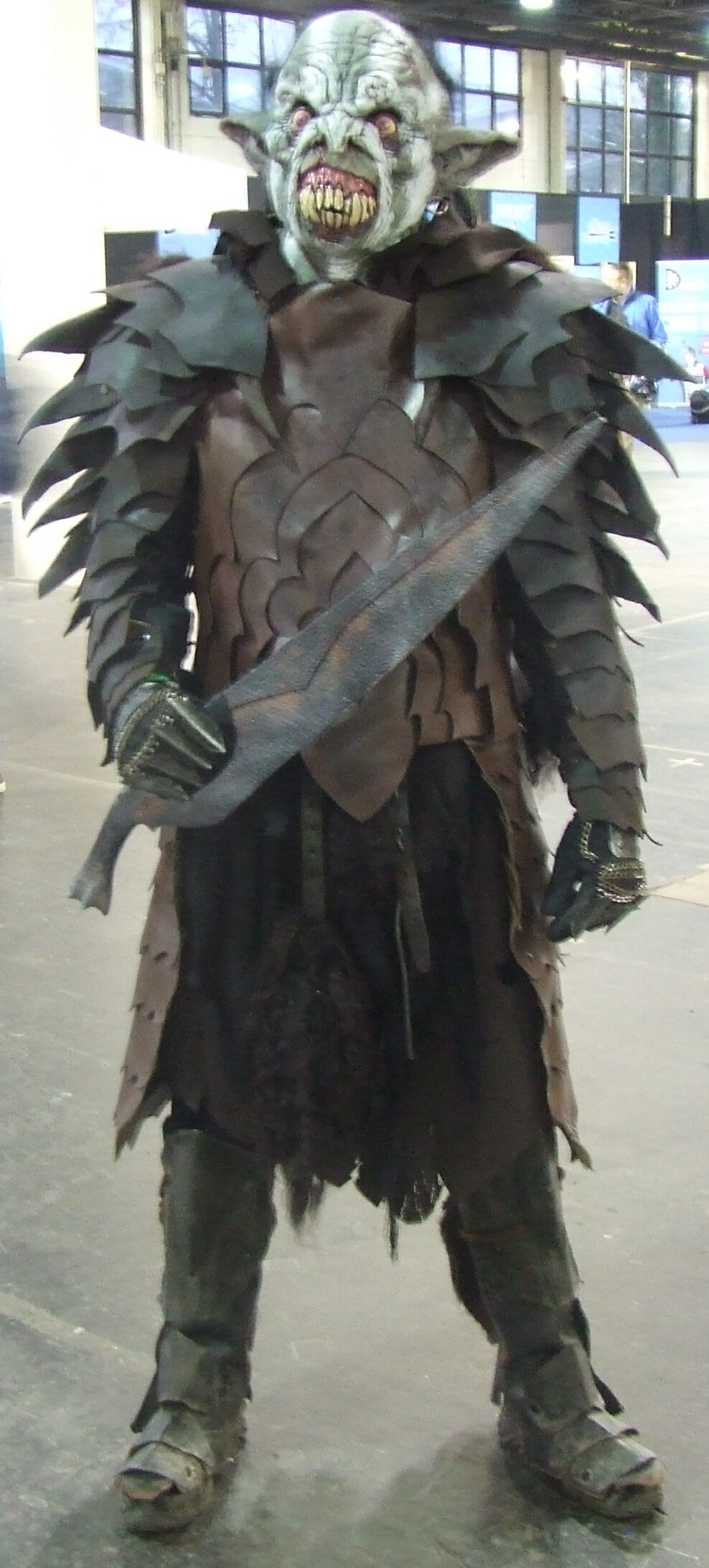
A Tolkien fan in a The Lord of the Rings fantasy costume, Budapest, 2015

Although fantasy had long existed in various forms around the world before his time, J. R. R. Tolkien has been called the "father of fantasy", and The Lord of the Rings its centre. That novel, published in 1954–1955, enormously influenced fantasy writing, establishing in particular the form of high or epic fantasy, set in a secondary or fantasy world in an act of mythopoeia. The book was distinctive at the time for its considerable length, its "epic" feel with a cast of heroic characters, its wide geography, and its battles. It involved an extensive history behind the action, an impression of depth, multiple sentient races and monsters, and powerful talismans. The story is a quest, with multiple subplots. The novel's success demonstrated that the genre was commercially distinct and viable.

Many later fantasy writers have either imitated Tolkien's work, or have written in reaction against it. One of the first was Ursula Le Guin's Earthsea series of novels, starting in 1968, which used Tolkienian archetypes such as wizards, a disinherited prince, a magical ring, a quest, and dragons. A publishing rush followed. Fantasy authors including Stephen R. Donaldson and Philip Pullman have created intentionally non-Tolkienian fantasies, Donaldson with an unloveable protagonist, and Pullman, who is critical of The Lord of the Rings, with a different view of the purpose of life.

The genre has spread into film, into both role-playing and video games, and into fantasy art. Peter Jackson's 2001–2003 The Lord of the Rings film series brought a new and very large audience to Tolkien's work. Tolkien's influence reached role-playing games as early as 1974 with Gary Gygax's Dungeons & Dragons; this was followed by many Middle-earth video games, some directly licensed and others based on Tolkienian fantasy culture. Tolkien's fantasies have been illustrated by artists such as John Howe, Alan Lee, and Ted Nasmith, who have become known as "Tolkien artists".

== Context ==
J. R. R. Tolkien was a scholar of English literature, a philologist and medievalist interested in language and poetry from the Middle Ages, especially that of Anglo-Saxon England and Northern Europe. His professional knowledge of works such as Beowulf shaped his fictional world of Middle-earth, including his high fantasy novel The Lord of the Rings. This did not prevent him from making use of modern sources including fantasy as well; the J.R.R. Tolkien Encyclopedia discusses 25 authors whose works are paralleled by elements in Tolkien's writings.

== Fantasy in Tolkien's hands ==
=== Distinctive features ===
The Lord of the Rings was constructed with several distinctive features. These included its considerable length, remarkable for its time when few genre novels exceeded 65,000 words. This was accompanied by an "epic" feel, created by a combination of features such as its cast of heroic characters, its wide geography, and its battles. The story is told with allusions to older times, giving both an impression of depth behind the action, and a past that fades into mythology. The heroes encounter multiple sentient races, including both free peoples like elves and dwarves, and monsters like trolls and giant spiders. Powerful talismans are deployed, such as swords with their own names, wizards' staffs, magical rings and seeing stones. As for the story, there is a quest, accompanied by many subplots. Moreover, Tolkien gives the plot a moral dimension: the characters have to rely on their own courage and luck, believing that the unseen powers will support them.

The Lord of the Rings, and to some extent also his 1937 children's novel, The Hobbit, make use of multiple elements to make the fantasy world of Middle-earth convincing. These include detailed maps with a large number of placenames, English-sounding in the case of The Shire, home to his hobbit protagonists; an impression of depth; a frame story; poetry interspersed with the narrative; family trees; invented languages that had been worked out in detail, complete with scripts; artwork; and heraldry.

Heraldry of Middle-earth: a coat of arms bearing the White Tree of Gondor

The impression of depth in particular helps to make Middle-earth feel like what Tom Shippey has called "a coherent, consistent, deeply fascinating world about which [Tolkien] had no time [then] to speak". As another example, the heraldry helps to convey impressions such as the "evident majesty" of the hero Aragorn:

upon the foremost ship a great standard broke, and the wind displayed it as she turned towards the Harlond. There flowered a White Tree, and that was for Gondor; but Seven Stars were about it, and a high crown above it, the signs of Elendil that no lord had borne for years beyond count. And the stars flamed in the sunlight, for they were wrought of gems by Arwen daughter of Elrond; and the crown was bright in the morning, for it was wrought of mithril and gold.

=== Mythopoeia ===
Mythopoeia is the creation of a fictional mythology, incorporating traditional mythological themes and archetypes within a work of literature. Tolkien was not the first author to create fictional worlds, as George MacDonald and H. Rider Haggard had done so, and were praised for their "mythopoeic" gifts by Tolkien's friend and fellow-Inkling C. S. Lewis. Tolkien however went much further, spending many years developing what has been called a mythology for England, starting in 1914. The Finnish scholar Jyrki Korpua argues that Tolkien followed a specific mythopoetic code in his legendarium, spanning creation (Ainulindalë), world-building (Valaquenta, start of Quenta Silmarillion), the fall (Quenta Silmarillion), a period of struggle (Akallabêth and The Lord of the Rings), and the end of the world (as in Morgoth's Ring). Korpua states that this code is both linear and somewhat Biblical, and that it makes use of archetypes. Tolkien created numerous archetypes in his Middle-earth writings. He established as stock fantasy elements, familiar and attractive to readers, the distinct races of Elves, Dwarves, Ents, Trolls, Orcs, and Hobbits.

== Impact ==
The Lord of the Rings had an enormous impact on the fantasy genre; in some respects, it swamped all the works of fantasy that had been written before it, and it unquestionably created "fantasy" as a marketing category. Tolkien has been called the "father" of modern fantasy, or more specifically of high fantasy. Tolkien's works brought fantasy literature a new degree of mainstream acclaim; numerous polls named The Lord of the Rings the greatest book of the century. The author and editor of Journal of the Fantastic in the Arts, Brian Attebery, writes that fantasy is defined "not by boundaries but by a centre", which is The Lord of the Rings.

Diana Paxson states in Mythlore that Tolkien had founded a new literary tradition. Tolkien's influence, and his literary criticism, greatly popularized secondary worlds, as his formative essay "On Fairy Stories" termed them. This led to the decline of such devices as dream frames to explain away a fantastical setting.

== Tolkien-influenced fantasy writing ==
It has been said of Tolkien that "most subsequent writers of fantasy are either imitating him or else desperately trying to escape his influence", while "his hold over readers has been extraordinary".

=== Inspired by Tolkien ===
The immense success of Tolkien's works started a publishing rush. Lin Carter edited the Ballantine Adult Fantasy series from 1969, reprinting Morris, Dunsany, MacDonald, and Mirrlees, alongside some new works. Many authors wrote "Tolkienesque" books, with stories rooted in folklore, myth, and magic, set in a medieval countryside. Among these were Patricia A. McKillip's The Forgotten Beasts of Eld and Jane Yolen's The Magic Three of Solatia, Tolkien-inspired fantasies for young adults written in the mid-1970s. Yolen comments that while some of the writing was good, "what began in grace and power easily degenerated into a kind of mythic silliness", with "pastel unicorns, coy talking swords, and a paint-by-number medieval setting with the requisite number of dirty inns, evil wizards, and gentle hairy-footed beings of various sexual persuasions. Tolkien ... would have been horrified."

A safe and comfortable format?

Fantasy has come to be identified with a bunch of multi-volume Tolkien clones that follow an overly-familiar trajectory... we all know how it goes: a youth (almost always male) is unexpectedly revealed to have a special skill or be a long-lost prince and must then embark on a quest to recover various plot tokens before finally defeating the forces of evil. It's a format that accounts for an awful lot of what appears on the fantasy shelves of our bookshops, from The Sword of Shannara by Terry Brooks to the Harry Potter novels by J. K. Rowling. The format may be safe and comfortable, but it represents only a very tiny proportion of what fantasy can do... — Paul Kincaid

In 1977, Lester Del Rey, seeking to mirror Tolkien's work, published Terry Brooks's The Sword of Shannara. The book was heavily criticised by Carter, Attebery and others for copying the plot and characters of The Lord of the Rings wholesale; Attebery wrote that it attempted "to evoke wonder without engaging the mind or emotions", reducing Tolkien's artistry "to a bare formula". (Note: Fimi notes that critics have directly equated elements of The Sword of Shannara with elements of The Lord of the Rings, such as The Vale with The Shire, Allanon with Gandalf.) Despite this, it gained the sort of breakthrough success that Del Rey had hoped for; it became the first fantasy novel to appear on, and eventually to top, the New York Times bestseller list.

Guy Gavriel Kay, who had assisted Christopher Tolkien with the editing of The Silmarillion, later wrote his own Tolkien-influenced fantasy trilogy, The Fionavar Tapestry (1984–86), complete with dwarves and mages. Dennis L. McKiernan's Silver Call duology was intended to be a direct sequel to The Lord of the Rings but had to be altered. The Iron Tower trilogy, highly influenced by Tolkien's books, was then written as backstory. Fantasy series such as Terry Pratchett's Discworld and Orson Scott Card's The Tales of Alvin Maker were "undoubtedly" influenced by Tolkien.

In 1992, Martin H. Greenberg edited a festschrift collection of short stories by 19 fantasy authors including Yolen, Stephen R. Donaldson, Terry Pratchett, Poul and Karen Anderson, and Peter S. Beagle on the centenary of Tolkien's birth. Yolen, commenting that "sometimes it is difficult to remember that there were fantasy books written before J. R. R. Tolkien's work", stated that the stories were not imitations, "for none of us are imitators—but in honor of his work".

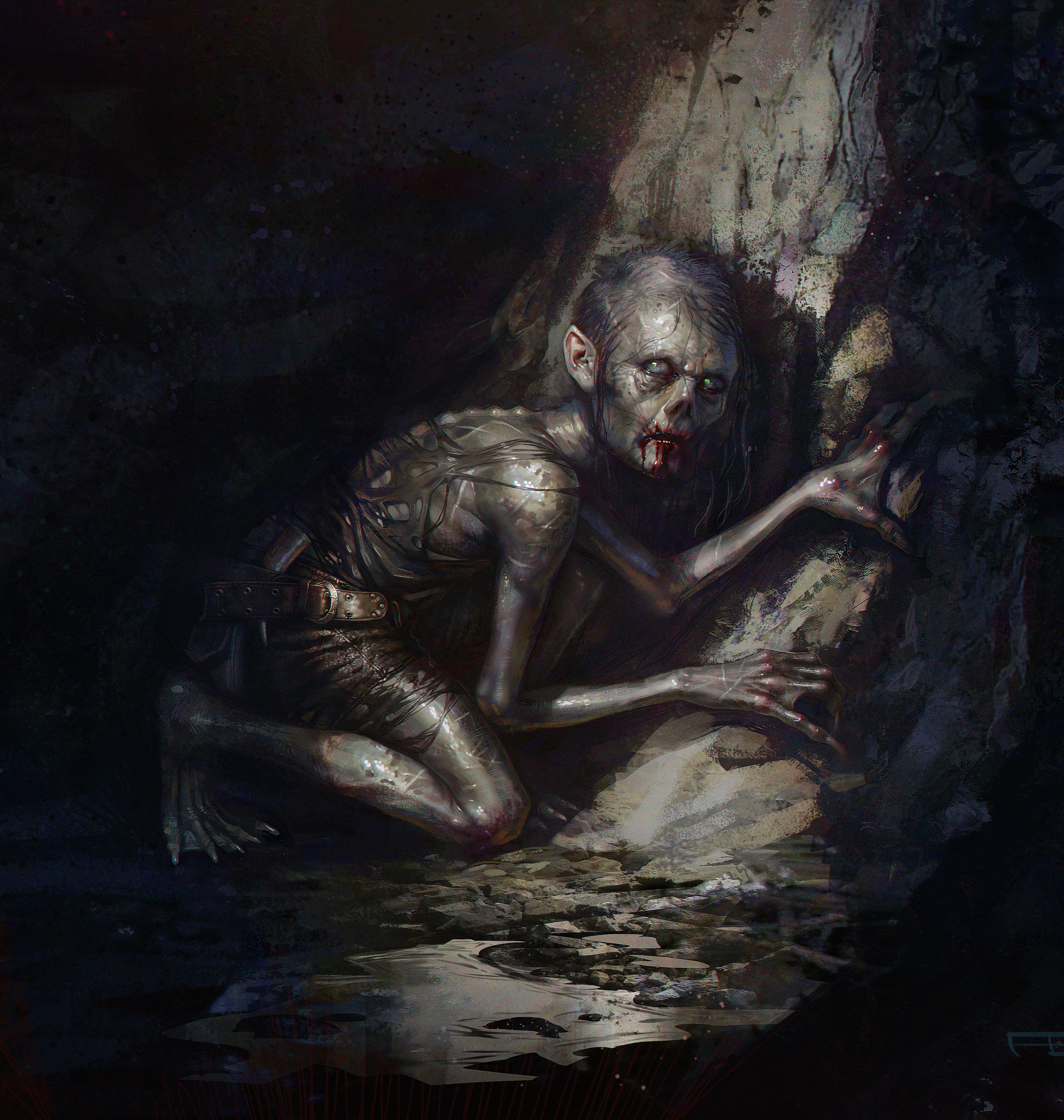
Tolkien created or popularized fantasy elements such as heroes, quests, magical objects, wizards, elves, dwarves, and monsters including Gollum. Painting of Gollum by Frederic Bennet, 2014

Many writers have made use of Tolkienesque plots, settings, and characters. The plot of Pat Murphy's 1999 There and Back Again intentionally mirrors that of The Hobbit, but is transposed into a science-fiction setting involving space travel. J. K. Rowling's 1997–2007 Harry Potter series, too, is influenced by Tolkien; for example, the wizard Dumbledore has been described as partially inspired by Tolkien's Gandalf. Further, Rowling explores the Tolkienian themes of death and immortality, and the nature of evil and how it arises, with Lord Voldemort taking the place of the Dark Lord Morgoth. S.M. Stirling's "Emberverse" series includes a character obsessed with The Lord of the Rings who creates a post-apocalyptic community based Tolkien's Elves and Dúnedain. The same plot point was used by the Russian writer Vladimir Berezin in his novel Road Signs (from the Universe of Metro 2033). The horror writer Stephen King has acknowledged Tolkien's influence on his novel The Stand and his fantasy series The Dark Tower. Other prominent fantasy writers including George R. R. Martin, Michael Swanwick, Raymond E. Feist, Poul Anderson, Karen Haber, Harry Turtledove, Charles De Lint, and Orson Scott Card have acknowledged Tolkien's work as an inspiration.

=== Reacting against Tolkien ===
Some writers have reacted against Tolkien by creating fantasy that does not fit the expected pattern. Thus, Stephen R. Donaldson's The Chronicles of Thomas Covenant has an unloveable protagonist quite unlike a hobbit: John R. Fultz calls Covenant "a whiner, a complainer, a broken man with no hope for himself or the kingdom he was charged with saving." The world that Covenant visits might resemble Middle-earth, as might his quest, but the book's approach, a "dark counterpoint to Tolkien's shining heroism", is entirely different.

Philip Pullman's His Dark Materials trilogy is according to Pullman "a rival" to both The Lord of the Rings and Tolkien's fellow-Inkling C. S. Lewis's The Chronicles of Narnia. Pullman states that he disagrees with Lewis's answer to questions about the existence of God and the purpose of life, and asserts that Tolkien "doesn't touch [those issues] at all." As a result, he finds Tolkien "essentially trivial" and "not worth arguing with." Ross Douthat comments in The Atlantic that Pullman's "dismiss[ing] the Rings saga as 'trivial' tells you a great deal about where his own fantasy saga went wrong." In Douthat's view, Pullman's "compelling and fun" world-building in The Golden Compass (the first novel in the trilogy), complete with the armoured bear "and the witches, the Jules Verne-meets-Tolkien landscape" slowly fades out in the later novels. Pullman has further criticised The Lord of the Rings for not having any strong female characters; in his view "There is absolutely no awareness of sexual power and mystery in the book."

The modern subgenre of grimdark fantasy has been described as an "anti-Tolkien" approach to fantasy writing, which British science fiction and fantasy novelist Adam Roberts characterizes by its reaction to Tolkien's idealism even though it owes a lot to Tolkien's work. George R. R. Martin, the author of A Song of Ice and Fire, cites Tolkien as an inspiration, while also stating his aims to go beyond what he sees as Tolkien's "medieval philosophy" of "if the king was a good man, the land would prosper" to delve into the complexities, ambiguities, and vagaries of real-life power."

=== Using Tolkienian sources ===
The scholar of folklore Dimitra Fimi suggests a third group of Tolkien-influenced authors, the British fantasists Susan Cooper, Alan Garner, and Diana Wynne Jones. In her view, all were, like Tolkien, prompted to fantasy by war; all three attended Tolkien's lectures at the University of Oxford; and all admitted being influenced by "British myth and folklore", the sorts of medieval "intertexts" that Tolkien had used. While Wynne Jones wrote high fantasy, about secondary worlds, Cooper and Garner wrote "intrusion" fantasy, in which the supernatural or fantastic intrudes into the ordinary world.

=== Reworking Tolkienian conventions ===
Wizards, dragons, adventures ...

The island of Gont, a single mountain that lifts its peak a mile above the storm-racked Northeast Sea, is a land famous for wizards. From the towns in its high valleys and the ports on its dark narrow bays many a Gontishman has gone forth to serve the Lords of the Archipelago in their cities as wizard or mage, or, looking for adventure, to wander working magic from isle to isle of all Earthsea. Of these some say the greatest, and surely the greatest voyager, was the man called Sparrowhawk, who in his day became both dragonlord and Archmage. His life is told of in the Deed of Ged and in many songs, but this is a tale of the time before his fame, before the songs were made. — Ursula Le Guin, A Wizard of Earthsea

In 1968, Ursula K. Le Guin published the high fantasy A Wizard of Earthsea, followed between 1970 and 2001 by her other Earthsea novels and short stories. It was one of the first fantasy series influenced by Tolkien. (Note: The Tolkien scholar John Garth writes that Tolkien's name appears to be hidden in the small amount of the Hardic language of Earthsea in The Wizard of Earthsea. "Sea" is sukien, from suk, "foam", and inien, "feather". "Rock", the material of earth, is "tolk", so, he suggests, the Hardic for "Earthsea" would be Tolkien, for tolk + inien on the same pattern as sukien. Garth suggests that this is a tribute to Tolkien, tolk being the first word of the "Old Speech" that she names, and the first to be handed down both by the Wizard Ged to Tenar in The Tombs of Atuan, and by Tenar to her daughter in Tehanu.) Among the Tolkienian archetypes in the Earthsea books are wizards (including the protagonist, Ged), a disinherited prince (Arren in The Farthest Shore), a magical ring (the ring of Erreth-Akbe in The Tombs of Atuan), a Middle-earth style quest (in The Farthest Shore), and powerful dragons (like the dragon of Pendor, in A Wizard of Earthsea).

Fimi writes that Le Guin's secondary world, along with its mythology, is "very much un-Tolkienian". It has its own culture, languages, and history, but, she notes, Earthsea does not share the British "flavor" of Middle-earth; Earthsea consists of an archipelago not a continent, has brown-skinned protagonists, and Taoist philosophy. Le Guin stated that Tolkien's wizard Gandalf was the "germ" for A Wizard of Earthsea; the character led her to wonder how wizards learnt "what is obviously an erudite and dangerous art? Are there colleges for young wizards?", resulting in the young Ged's going to the island of Roke to study at the School of Magic and ultimately to become the Archmage. In Fimi's view, Le Guin "has navigated her way around Tolkien's legacy with care and a real creative flair."

== Tolkien-influenced fantasy media ==
=== Film ===
The fantasy genre has expanded from the written form into film. Peter Jackson's 2001–3 The Lord of the Rings film series brought Tolkien to the cinema screen, gaining him, and fantasy in general, a new and very large audience. Its success was followed up by the 2005–10 The Chronicles of Narnia film series, adapted from Lewis's Narnia books, and the eight Harry Potter films. The fantasy market accommodated, too, some very un-Tolkien-like films, such as Guillermo del Toro's 2006 Pan's Labyrinth, set in post-Spanish Civil War Spain, where a mythical world full of strange monsters intrudes upon the real world. Del Toro was later involved in the development of The Hobbit film series, despite having said of Tolkien's Middle-earth that "I don't like little guys and dragons, hairy feet, hobbits .... I don't like sword and sorcery, I hate all that stuff".

=== Games ===
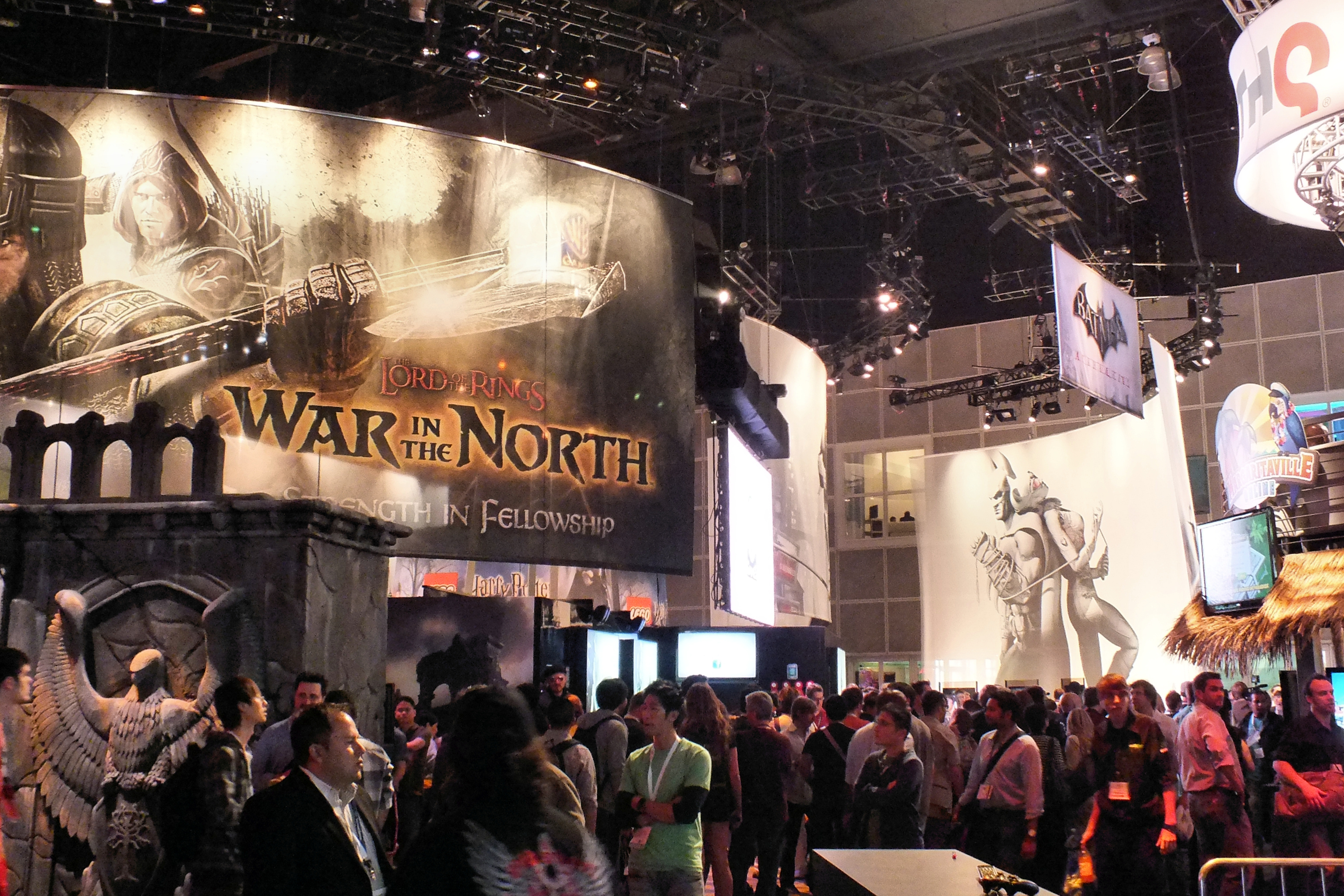
Middle-earth video games at E3 2011

Tolkien's influence extends to role-playing games including Gary Gygax's 1974 Dungeons & Dragons. Gygax was obliged, after a lawsuit, to rename some especially Tolkienesque types of character, such as Hobbits (which became "Halflings"), Nazgul (which became "Wraiths") and the Balrog (which became "Balor"). Many video games inspired by Middle-earth have been manufactured by studios including Electronic Arts, Vivendi Games, Melbourne House, and Warner Bros. Interactive Entertainment. Apart from games directly licensed to use Middle-earth material, other developers have developed video games such as Baldur's Gate, EverQuest, The Elder Scrolls, Neverwinter Nights, and World of Warcraft "grown from the culture put forth from Tolkien's works."

=== Art ===
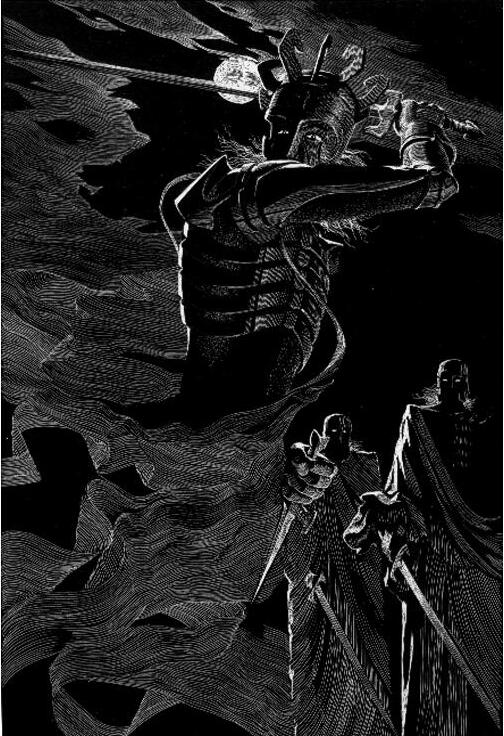
The Lord of the Nazgûl by Alexander Korotich

Tolkien is one of the few authors in any domain not just to have had his works illustrated by fantasy artists, in his case including John Howe, Alan Lee, and Ted Nasmith, whose work was praised by Tolkien, but to have spawned a named profession, "Tolkien artist". Howe and Lee served, too, as concept artists for Jackson's Middle-earth films. The Brothers Hildebrandt created many Tolkien artworks in the 1970s, a selection appearing in their Tolkien Calendars. In Russia, Alexander Korotich created a set of scraperboard illustrations for The Lord of the Rings. He also drew illustrations for a collection of Tolkien's fairy tales for the Ural Market publishing house.

== Sources ==
- Attebery, Brian (1980). The Fantasy Tradition in American Literature: From Irving to Le Guin. Bloomington: Indiana University Press. ISBN 978-0-2533-5665-9.
- Carpenter, Humphrey, ed. (2023) [1981]. The Letters of J. R. R. Tolkien: Revised and Expanded Edition. New York: HarperCollins. ISBN 978-0-35-865298-4.
- Clute, John, ed. (1997). The Encyclopedia of Fantasy. Orbit Books. ISBN 978-1-85723-368-1.
- Fimi, Dimitra (2020) [2014]. "Later Fantasy Fiction: Tolkien's Legacy". In Lee, Stuart D. (ed.). A Companion to J. R. R. Tolkien. Wiley Blackwell. pp. 335–349. ISBN 978-1-1196-5602-9. OCLC 1183854105.
- Flieger, Verlyn (2005). Interrupted Music: The Making Of Tolkien's Mythology. Kent State University Press. ISBN 9780873388245.
- Shippey, Tom (2005) [1982]. The Road to Middle-Earth: How J. R. R. Tolkien Created a New Mythology (Third ed.). HarperCollins. ISBN 978-0-261-10275-0.
- Tolkien, J. R. R. (1955). The Return of the King. The Lord of the Rings. Boston: Houghton Mifflin. OCLC 519647821.
