= Beholder =

Beholder may refer to:

== Film and TV ==
- "The Beholder" (The Outer Limits), episode of the television series The Outer Limits
- Beholder, an episode of The Bridge
- Beholder, an episode of Almost Human
- Beholder, an episode of The Invisible Man

== Other ==
- Beholder (Dungeons & Dragons), a fictional monster in the Dungeons & Dragons role-playing game
- Beholder (horse), race horse winner of the 2013 and 2016 Breeders' Cup Distaff
- Beholder (video game), a 2016 video game
- Beholder Kft., Hungarian publishing company
- The Beholder (magazine), a role-playing game magazine
- The Beholder, novel by Julian Davies 1996
- The Beholder, nickname of Jeroen Streunding from Neophyte

== See also ==
- Eye of the Beholder (disambiguation)
