= Molly Bawn =

Molly Bawn may refer to:

- Molly Bawn (novel), an 1878 novel by Margaret Wolfe Hungerford
- Molly Bawn (film), a 1916 film directed by Cecil M. Hepworth
- Polly Vaughn, as a variant version of the Irish folk-song
