= Shadows of Doom =

Shadows of Doom may refer to

- Shadows of Doom, a fantasy novel by Ed Greenwood
- Shadows of Doom, a fantasy novel by Dennis L. McKiernan
