= The Manual of Aurania =

Tabletop role-playing game supplement

Cover of the first printing, 1976

The Manual of Aurania is a 24-page supplement for fantasy role-playing games self-published in 1976 and sold at Aero Hobbies, a games store in Santa Monica, California owned by Gary Switzer. A 34-page 2nd edition revision of the book was later published by International Gamers Association with numerous added illustrations in 1977.

== Contents ==
The Manual of Aurania is an unlicensed Dungeons & Dragons supplement containing more than 50 new monsters, nine dragons, new character classes, and tables to randomly determine the results of reincarnation.

The new character classes included:

- Beorning
- Sidhe
- Samurai
- Basadae
- Leprechaun
- Shape-Shifter
- Cleric of Mitra
- Cleric of Asgard (either Thor or Odin)

The new monsters included seven new types of giants, five trolls, nine types of undead, eight dragons, six demons, and 22 miscellaneous creatures.

== Publication history ==
In 1974, when TSR published Dungeons & Dragons, one of the earliest adopters was Aero Hobbies. A large D&D group quickly formed and played regularly, developing a world called "Aurania", and several new variant rules and monsters. Someone in the group came up with the idea for a new character class based on lock-picking skills. One of the players, Daniel Wagner, later recalled, "One group had a dwarf who wanted to try picking locks with his dagger, so I had the idea for a Burglar class, which we drew up like a Magic user but with skills (like Lock picking) instead of spells. The consensus was to call the class 'Thief'." Wanting to share this news, store owner Switzer called Gary Gygax at TSR and described the thief class. Gygax subsequently developed the fourth official character class for D&D called the "thief", and published an early version in the independent games zine Great Plains Game Players Newsletter, crediting "Gary Schweitzer" of "sunny California" for the idea.

Back at Aero Hobbies, news of the article did not travel as far as Santa Monica, and Switzer did not tell the group he had shared the group's idea with Gygax, so when the new Thief class appeared in the first D&D supplement, Greyhawk, the group assumed Gygax had stolen their idea. Their response was to write The Manual of Aurania, a collection of all of the new rules and monsters their group had developed. In the introduction, the authors claimed that several of their original concepts had been "stolen outright", and the purpose of the book was "to prevent this from happening again".

Manual of Aurania was written by Hugh K. Singh, D. Daniel Wagner, and Larry E. Stehle. The Aero Hobbies group printed 200 copies of the 30-page book in 1976. This edition was advertised as being available from Aero Hobbies and at Westercon 29 in Alarums and Excursions #11 in May 1976. A second printing of 1,000 copies, with typos corrected and artwork by Troy Hughes and Aimee Karklyn, was published by International Gamers Association and was announced for sale by mail order in September 1977.

The original developer of the Thief class, Darrold Daniel Wagner, later related that when he met Gary Gygax at a convention, Gygax contended that the unlicensed Manual of Aurania was intellectual property theft, and threatened to sue. When Wagner reminded him of the origin of the Thief class, Gygax relented, saying, "One good steal deserves another."

Shannon Appelcline noted how the International Gamers Association had a close connection with Grimoire Games and through this short-lived partnership the IGA handled distribution for Grimoire out of Long Beach, and that "Through this connection, Grimoire ended up associated with two other Californian "generic FRP" supplements that were also being distributed by IGA: The Manual of Aurania (1977, 1978) and Wizard's Aide (1977)."

The Aero Hobbies group finished a second book, Libram of Aurania, but it was never published.

== Reception ==
In the December 1978–January 1979 edition of White Dwarf (Issue #10), Don Turnbull was not taken with the new character classes, saying, "it seems to me that most, if not all these new creations are stronger than they should be, with no corresponding increase in weak points." Likewise he was not enthusiastic about the variant reincarnation rules, pointing out that dead characters had the same chance of returning as either a powerful gold dragon or as a lowly gnome. But he was impressed by the sixty new monsters presented, commenting, "It is in this section that I think most readers will find their main interest lies." He concluded "On the whole, it's not a bad booklet and a reasonable buy for the money" and gave the book a rating of 4 out of 10.
