= Myth and magic =

Myth and magic may refer to:

- Myth and ritual, two central components of religious practice
- Myth and Magic, a novel series by Keri Arthur
- Myth and Magic: Art According to the Inklings, a 2007 essay collection by Eduardo Segura and Thomas Honegger
- Myth and Magic: The Art of John Howe, a 2001 book by John Howe

== See also ==
- Man, Myth & Magic (disambiguation)
- Myths and Magic, a novel series by F. T. Lukens
