= Balrog Banter =

British RPG zine

- Editor: Paul Evans
- Categories: Role-playing games
- Country: United Kingdom
- Based in: Wolverhampton

Balrog Banter was a British fanzine published in the mid-1980s that featured articles and adventure scenarios about role-playing games (RPGs).

== Description ==
Balrog Banter was created and published by Paul Evans of Wolverhampton. The first few issues were derided for poor layout, presentation and writing style. Despite this, in the "1986 Rolegaming Fanzine Poll" conducted by the British magazine Adventurer, Balrog Banter placed ninth.

Articles covered popular RPGs, particularly Dungeons & Dragons, Judge Dredd, Golden Heroes and Laserburn, and also provided live action role-playing (LARP) reviews. Starting with Issue 2, the zine included a letters column and reviews of other fanzines. Balrog Banter also included RPG adventure modules in each issue.

It lasted nine issues before Evans discontinued it.

== Reception ==
Dave Nalle, writing for Abyss, was not impressed by Issue #2, commenting that had been "reproduced by horrible looking xerox." Nalle found some of the articles interesting, and thought the adventure modules were "a bit above average." Overall, Nalle commented that "The content is fairly typical of new zines, and it will have to be improved and perhaps given a unique style if [it] is to survive." Nalle concluded, "BB is a great bargain for the money, if you live in the UK. For US readers ... it isn't really striking enough to recommend over other more distinguished zines unless you are a completist."

Writing for the British RPG magazine Imagine, Mike Lewis reviewed the first issue and compared it to another young zine, Demon's Drawl, saying, "The material in BB is very similar to that in DD (why do so many zines have alliterative names?) but lacks the polish and content. However, considering the terrible nature of Demon's Drawl 1, Balrog's Banter could well improve in exactly the same way!" Two issues later, Lewis reviewed Balrog Banter #2 and noted that the zine "is already showing signs of improvement, with the additions of a letter column and a couple of discussion pieces ... The zine could do with some better artwork, and perhaps some more thought in the layout." Lewis concluded, "Overall BB 2 is a very pleasing second issue."

In Issue 10 of Adventurer, Alex Bardy and Ben Goodale reviewed the seventh issue of Balrog Banter and noted "BB offers a lot of rules and stuff ... and if you don't like reading lots of stats, you won't like BB, though it does contain some 'chatty' bits." They concluded, "it's definitely improved, is well printed, and has some good artists too; quite a few reasons to pick [it] up."
