= Eye of the Beholder =

Eye of the beholder is a phrase meaning something is a matter of personal opinion. It is shortened from the aphorism "beauty is in the eye of the beholder", which originally appeared in the 1878 novel Molly Bawn. It may refer to:

== Books ==
- Eye of the Beholder, a 1999 novel by Jayne Ann Krentz
- The Eye of the Beholder, a 1980 novel by Marc Behm, basis for the 1999 film
- The Eye of the Beholder: The Life of Muhammad as Viewed by the Early Muslims: A Textual Analysis, a 1995 book by Uri Rubin
- Eye of the Beholder: Johannes Vermeer, Antoni van Leeuwenhoek, and the Reinvention of Seeing, a 2015 book by Laura J. Snyder
- "Eye of the Beholder", a story by Burt K. Filer, which appeared in Again, Dangerous Visions

== Music ==
- Eye of the Beholder (album), a 1988 album by the Chick Corea Elektric Band
- "Eye of the Beholder" (song), a 1988 song by Metallica

== Television ==
- Eye of the Beholder (TV series), a 1974 Canadian travel documentary miniseries

=== Episodes ===
- "Eye of the Beholder" (Adam-12)
- "Eye of the Beholder" (Aladdin)
- "Eye of the Beholder" (All Saints)
- "Eye of the Beholder" (American Dragon: Jake Long)
- "Eye of the Beholder" (American Gothic)
- "Eye of the Beholder" (Ben 10: Ultimate Alien)
- "Eye of the Beholder" (Bewitched)
- "Eye of the Beholder" (BraveStarr)
- "Eye of the Beholder" (Castle)
- "Eye of the Beholder" (Dallas)
- "Eye of the Beholder" (Degrassi: The Next Generation)
- "Eye of the Beholder" (Disney's Adventures of the Gummi Bears)
- "Eye of the Beholder" (The Famous Jett Jackson)
- "Eye of the Beholder" (Fear the Walking Dead)
- "Eye of the Beholder" (Gargoyles)
- "Eye of the Beholder" (Hercules: The Legendary Journeys)
- "Eye of the Beholder" (Highlander: The Series)
- "Eye of the Beholder" (Hustle)
- "Eye of the Beholder" (Knots Landing)
- "Eye of the Beholder" (Mummies Alive!)
- "Eye of the Beholder" (The Mystic Knights of Tir Na Nog)
- "Eye of the Beholder" (Northern Exposure)
- "Eye of the Beholder" (Seeing Things)
- "Eye of the Beholder" (Sleepwalkers)
- "Eye of the Beholder" (Shark)
- "The Eye of the Beholder" (Star Trek: The Animated Series)
- "Eye of the Beholder" (Star Trek: The Next Generation)
- "Eye of the Beholder" (ThunderCats)
- "Eye of the Beholder" (The Twilight Zone, 1959)
- "Eye of the Beholder" (The Twilight Zone, 2002)

== Video games ==
- Eye of the Beholder (video game), a 1991 video game, followed by two sequels
- Eye of the Beholder (2002 video game), an adaptation of the 1991 game

== Other media ==
- Eye of the Beholder (film), a 1999 thriller
- Eye of the Beholder, a 1998 sculpture by Christopher Hall

== See also ==
- "Eyes of the Beholder", an episode of the television series Grimm
- In the Eye of the Beholder, a 2010 Hong Kong costume drama television series
