= Tempestuous Orifice =

British RPG zine

- Cover of Issue #6
- Editor: Patrick Fama; Chris Davies
- Categories: Role-playing games
- Country: United Kingdom
- Based in: Morden, Surrey

Tempestuous Orifice was a British zine published in the mid-1980s that featured articles and scenarios about fantasy and horror role-playing.

== Description ==
Tempestuous Orifice was an RPG zine published by Patrick Fama and Chris Davies in Morden, Surrey that focused on fantasy and horror role-playing games. Regular offerings included a letters column, reviews, and scenarios for role-playings games such as Call of Cthulhu and Tunnels & Trolls. The zine was 32 digest-sized pages in length.

== Reception ==
Mike Lewis, writing for the British RPG magazine Imagine, reviewed Issue #5 and commented, "The quality is still high, with informative, chatty articles and good scenarios. It is probably the best FRP fanzine around." However, Lewis noted "TO does seem to be aiming a little above itself with a statement about how they intend to influence the next generation of zines. Pretensions above their means? — only time will tell." Several issues later, Paul Cockburn called Issue #6 "superbly produced, with crisp printing and art. The contents are up to scratch as well, with discussions of characteristics in FRP games, a large Tunnels & Trolls solo set in Egypt and plenty more."

Writing in Abyss, Dave Nalle noted that this zine was "characterized by excellent organization and clear presentation. It is well ordered and easy to follow and there is a genuine effort at professional quality writing and editing, though a table of contents would be a big help." Nalle pointed out "There isn't a great amount of material here, but what is there is actually fully fleshed out, so that the articles are actually a decent read." Nalle concluded by giving this zine a rating of 6 out of 10, writing "TO is definitely worth checking out, though given the way it is produced and the somewhat high price (60 pence per issue), I wouldn't be surprised if it has some problems staying in print."

== Reviews ==
- Imagine #4
- Imagine #8
- Imagine #11
- Imagine #14
- Imagine #17
- Imagine #29

== Awards ==
At the 1984 Games Day Awards organized by Games Workshop, Tempestuous Orifice placed third in the category "Best Fanzine".
