= GamesMaster Catalog =

GamesMaster Catalog was a wargaming magazine published in 1980 by Boynton & Assoc, Clifton House, Clifton, VA.

== Contents ==
GamesMaster Catalog was the first comprehensive guide for published games.

== Reception ==
Steve Jackson reviewed GamesMaster Catalog in The Space Gamer No. 37. Jackson commented that "the GamesMaster Catalog is a good buy for the serious game collector - and a must for a game club or store."
