= The Oracle (magazine) =

Defunct RPG magazine (1982–1983)

- Cover of Issue #1, August 1982
- Editor: Christopher Bigelow
- Publisher: Horizon International
- First issue: July 1982
- Final issue Number: 1983; 24

The Oracle, subtitled "Magazine of Fantasy Gaming", was a magazine published by Horizon International, Inc. that focused on fantasy role-playing games such as Dungeons & Dragons.

== Contents ==
The Oracle was a digest-sized semi-professional magazine that focused on fantasy role-playing games. Before publication, it advertised that it would include fiction, art, new game variants, dungeon adventures, new monsters and magic items, and campaign expansion ideas.. Five issues of the magazine were published between July 1982 and Fall 1983.

== History and profile ==
Christopher Bigelow, a Mormon teenager in Salt Lake, Utah, was entranced by fantasy role-playing games, and founded Horizon International in order to publish his own fanzine. The result was The Oracle, which was first published in July 1982.

Despite good critical reception, Bigelow lacked marketing acumen and the magazine failed to find an audience, ceasing publication in the fall of 1983 after five issues. Ian L. Straus noted, "It had impressive graphics and artwork and competent editing, which made it superior to most amateur 'zines. Much of the artwork consisted of excellent reproduction of photographs. Some of the content was done by well-known professionals in the hobby [...] To sum it up: bad management and no marketing judgement."

== Reception ==
In Issue 21 of Abyss, Dave Nalle reviewed the first two issues of The Oracle and commented, "The content is fairly well balanced, with a tendency to feature a lot of review-type material. Unfortunately, although the reviews in these issues were interesting and they covered a number of areas, most of the non-review material was not particularly inspired." Although Nalle found the quality of writing to be of "unusually high quality", he felt that the magazine "seems to lack direction. It has the potential to do outstanding things, but until editorial policy becomes more resolved, it is hard to make a fair judgement on what Oracle will become." Nalle concluded, "I would certainly recommend looking into Oracle. If it gets settled successfully it could have quite a future."
