= Man, Myth & Magic =

Man, Myth & Magic may refer to:

- Man, Myth & Magic (encyclopedia), a 1970 encyclopedia by BPC Publishing, Purnell and Sons, and Marshall Cavendish
- Man, Myth & Magic (role-playing game), a 1982 role-playing game by Yaquinto Publications and Precis Intermedia
- Man, Myth & Magic, a 2010 album by Dave Hewson
- Man, Myth & Magic, a 2023 album by Sendelica
- "Man, Myth & Magic", a song by Venom from the 2000 album Resurrection

== See also ==
- Myth and magic (disambiguation)
- Profondo Argento: The Man, the Myths & the Magic, a 2004 book by Alan Jones
