= Grey Worlds =

Final issue as a zine (#15)

First issue produced by I.C.E., with cover art by Angus McBride

Grey Worlds was a fanzine about Rolemaster that first appeared in 1989. It was eventually published by Iron Crown Enterprises (I.C.E.) as a professional-quality magazine.

== Contents ==
Grey Worlds started life in 1989 as a fanzine focused on I.C.E.'s Rolemaster fantasy role-playing game, although occasional articles about Bladestorm, Cyberspace, Dark Space, and Space Master also appeared.

I.C.E. eventually took over production and created a professional-looking magazine that covered I.C.E. products, particularly Middle-earth Role Playing and Rolemaster, although articles about Shadow World and Silent Death also appeared.

== Publication history ==
Grey Worlds was started as a Rolemaster fanzine in 1989 by Ross Henton and Lem Richards. They published it regularly, and by 1992, they had produced 15 issues. Although it began as a primitive-looking zine, the final issues were of increasingly better quality, albeit still stapled and with a black & white cover.

At that point I.C.E. took over production, with the plan to produce a regularly scheduled glossy games periodical. Henton and Richards were retained as the Editor in Chief and Production Manager respectively. The numbering was restarted, and Issue 1, a professionally printed and saddle-stitched magazine, was released in June 1993 featuring a full-colour cover by Angus McBride and numerous advertisements. However Issue 2 was not released until January 1994, and Issue 3 did not appear until 1995. Production ceased after Issue 3.

As games historian Shannon Appelcline noted in his 2014 book Designers & Dragons, "ICE picked [Grey Worlds] up, with the intent to publish it at a more professional level, an experiment that failed after just three issues published over two years."

== Reception ==
Herb Petro reviewed the magazine in the February–March 1991 issue of White Wolf. He stated, "I have been very pleased with Grey Worlds, receiving it since issue #4, and I recommend it to all ICE RPG fans." He rated it overall at 4 points of a possible 5.
