= Booklet of Many Things =

British RPG zine

- Cover of Issue #3
- Editor: Mark Beresford
- Categories: Role-playing games
- Country: United Kingdom
- Based in: Chesterfield, Derbyshire

Booklet of Many Things was a British fanzine published in the mid-1980s that featured articles about role-playing games (RPGs).

== Description ==
Booklet of Many Things was created and published by Mark Beresford of Chesterfield, Derbyshire. The zine contained content regarding role-playing games, as well as a letters column, and included adventure scenarios for various role-playing games. Its style was light and humorous, and featured many cartoons, including on the front cover.

The zine was discontinued in 1985 after five issues.

== Reception ==
Writing for the British RPG magazine Imagine, Mike Lewis noted that the first issue "lacks the polish ... in appearance and contents, but tries to make up for it with wit and humour. Unfortunately, jokes about toads and terrible cartoons don't make up for a poor magazine!" In the next issue of Imagine, Lewis reviewed BoMT #2, and did not find much improvement, calling it "very similar to the first one. There is a useful piece on magic, but the zine is spoilt (for me at least) by the frantic attempts of the editors to be funny all the time, something which just doesn't come off."

Dave Nalle, writing for Abyss, liked the "nice, informal tone to it. This shines through the most in the incredibly silly cartoons which festoon it. Although these are not artistic, they actually are funny, and appropriate to the topic and the zine as a whole. If you can't have good art, you might as well have funny art." As for the actual content, Nalle thought it was "standard fare, but made more palatable by an engaging style in a zine that doesn't take itself too seriously." Nalle concluded by giving the zine an overall rating of 6 out of 10, saying, "I'd give BOMT a guarded recommendation. If you want to pick up a zine with fairly standard fare, get this one. Because of the style and wit involved, it might grow into something quite worthwhile in a few issues, especially if they can add some more substantive content."
