= The Fiery Cross (zine) =

British RPG zine

- Editor: Tom Stacey
- Categories: Fantasy role-playing games
- Country: United Kingdom
- Based in: Hawridge

The Fiery Cross was a British zine published in the mid-1980s that featured articles and scenarios about fantasy role-playing.

== Description ==
The Fiery Cross was a fantasy RPG zine produced by Tom Stacey in Hawridge that focussed on fantasy role-playing games. In addition to adventure scenarios, background articles and discussion about RPGs, there were also articles on diverse subjects such as religion, North American indigenous culture, and NASA, as well as reviews, a letter column and several comic strips. By Issue 3, the zine was 30 digest-sized pages.

== Reception ==
Paul Cockburn, writing for the British RPG magazine Imagine, reviewed the first three issues of The Fiery Cross:

- #1: "There are apparently some people out there actually reading this section of Imagine magazine, who have taken the advice given and started their own fanzines. Fiery Cross is the first of these new zines, and presents a very pleasing first issue. FC covers the AD&D and Tunnels & Trolls games, plus reviews and some chat. One to look out for."
- #2:"It isn't just Call of Cthulhu which is getting coverage nowadays; anyone remember that game Man, Myth and Magic? Well, The Fiery Cross #2 actually has a full-length scenario for the game, just about the first I've seen in any magazine. There is also the usual AD&D scenario (well, two of them actually), and a Warhammer scenario. Plus, they now have photo-reduced text, so you get twice as much content for only fivepence more, which can't be bad."
- #3: "Call of Cthulhu appears again in The Fiery Cross #3; my prediction last issue that it was catching on seems to be true ... For the more traditionalist, there is still AD&D material and a short Fighting Fantasy style solo adventure with its own rules system. Add plenty of chat and reviews and you have a very promising new fanzine."

Writing in Abyss, Dave Nalle reviewed the third issue of The Fiery Cross and commented, "Its production is sort of sloppy and the art and graphics are downright awful ... but a fair amount of the content is worth checking out." Nalle's biggest annoyance was "that everything seems to be cut off. All the articles are annoyingly short. There is even a module which is all of three pages long." However, Nalle appreciated the mix of material in the zine, pointing out "There is a nice balance between several systems, including material for fantasy, horror and superhero background." Despite this, Nalle concluded by giving this zine a rating of 5 out of 10, saying, "This is not a great fanzine. It is sloppily done and doesn't have a great deal of character, but it might be worth checking out, perhaps after it has had a few issues in which to mature."

Ivan O'Brien, writing in Protoplasm, noted "tFC continues to be very well presented and full of discussion and background articles. Though it now has several comic strips of reasonable quality the drawings are a little stiff."
