= Fantasy Modeling =

Fantasy Modeling was a wargaming magazine first published in 1980.

== Contents ==
Fantasy Modeling was a magazine printed on slick paper with articles on wargames, role-playing games, miniatures, and plastic models for science fiction.

== Reception ==
Iain Delaney reviewed Fantasy Modeling in The Space Gamer No. 37. Delaney commented that "The first issue of Fantasy Modeling seems to be a last minute job, with typos throughout and even whole columns interposed. [...] the first issue is worth buying only for the pictures, or as an introduction to the hobby. Hopefully, later issues of this magazine will show improvement, otherwise this magazine will be one to be avoided."
