= Game Merchant =

Magazine

Game Merchant was a gaming magazine first published in 1981, and was edited by Alex Marciniszyn.

== Contents ==
Game Merchant was a magazine that included news from the gaming hobby as well as upcoming products, submitted by game manufacturers.

== Reception ==
Lewis Pulsipher reviewed Game Merchant in The Space Gamer No. 43. Pulsipher commented that "Without seeing the subscribers-only material I cannot say with certainty whether this publication is worth [the annual price]. However, the supplements will have to be extraordinarily long or good."
