= Fantasia Today =

Fantasia Today is a role-playing game magazine that was published in Edmonton, Alberta, Canada.

== Publication history ==
Fantasia Today was a magazine dedicated to postal fantasy gaming based on the Midgard rules.

== Reception ==
In the February 1976 edition of The Strategic Review (Issue #6), Gary Gygax lamented the low print quality, saying that it "runs from fair to poor." He was rather impressed by "an excellent article on herbs and magic, complete with sketches of each herb." On a scale of "Major Tragedy" to "Major Triumph", he rated it a Minor Triumph.
