= The War Machine (newsletter) =

The War Machine was a gaming magazine first published in 1981 by Mike W. Costello.

== Contents ==
The War Machine was a newsletter published bimonthly in the UK focusing on the link between computers and wargames.

== Reception ==
Bruce F. Webster reviewed The War Machine in The Space Gamer No. 46. Webster commented that "It carries a hobbyist flavor reminiscent of the early Space Gamer, though the paper and print quality are better."

== Reviews ==
- Imagine #2
- Imagine #5
- Imagine #6
- Imagine #7
- Imagine #8
- Imagine #9
- Imagine #10
- Imagine #15
- Imagine #16
