= Fire the Arquebusiers! =

1970s and 1980s role-playing game magazine

Fire the Arquebusiers! is a role-playing game magazine that focused on Dungeons & Dragons and other fantasy role-playing games.

== Publication history ==
In the 1970s and 1980s, Greg Costikyan was an inveterate publisher of various fanzines focused on different subjects. Fire the Arquebusiers! was his Dungeons & Dragons fanzine, which he started in November 1975.

== Reviews ==
In the February 1976 edition of The Strategic Review (Issue #6), Gary Gygax lamented the poor print quality of the inaugural issue, saying it "was barely legible in spots." Gygax was rather impressed by the variety of articles, which ranged from "'Sex in D & D', new character types, a long article on spices and magic, and some other interesting items." Based on the first issue, Gygax thought the zine "seems to show potential", and on a scale of "Major Tragedy" to "Major Triumph", he rated it a Minor Triumph.
