= Green Goblin (zine) =

British RPG zine

- Editor: John Breakwell
- Categories: Role-playing games
- Country: United Kingdom
- Based in: Swansea, Wales

Green Goblin was a British zine published in the mid-1980s that featured articles and scenarios about fantasy and horror role-playing.

== Description ==
Green Goblin was an RPG zine published by John Breakwell in Swansea, Wales that originally focused on fantasy role-playing games (FRPs). Breakwell started it in 1984 after he got interested in FRPs at university. His stated aim was "to steer away from the cliched new monsters, magic items and character classes" featured in other RPG zines. The first issue, 42 digest-sized pages in length, featured the ecology of the Meazel, a new cult for RuneQuest, a piece on religion, and an AD&D scenario titled "Welcome to Hell!"

By Issue #6, the zine had expanded to 56 pages.

Breakwall produced seventeen issues of the zine on an erratic basis over the next seven years. During that time, the focus of the zine changed as Breakwell discovered new interests, which included play-by-mail (PBM) games, science fiction, media fandom and comics.

Regular offerings included an editorial, a letters column, reviews, and discussions.

In 1992, Breakwell started a subzine titled The Green Goblin Speaks within the pages of the Texas zine Rambling Way. Breakwell changed the focus of the zine from RPGs to current events in the United Kingdom, including politics and soccer.

== Reception ==
Mike Lewis, writing for the British RPG magazine Imagine, reviewed the first issue and commented, "[Breakwell] succeeds reasonably well in this first issue ... TGG could develop into a good zine along the lines of Demon's Drawl, and is certainly worth watching."

Writing in Abyss, Dave Nalle noted that this zine had "awful art but a good selection of material and some substantive content. " Nalle concluded by giving this zine a rating of 6 out of 10, saying, "On the whole it is an interesting read, with a tongue-in-cheek attitude which never gets too serious ... not the most intellectual or useful zine you will find, but it is a pleasant and interesting read and probably worth checking out."

Ivan O'Brien, writing for Protoplasm, called this "Very much a mixed bag, with the rubbish sitting beside the good stuff ... I can see how some people could get tired of the worse material. That said, the good stuff is worth waiting for." O'Brien concluded, "Good and bad, but I like it."

In the RPG magazine Adventurer, Ben Goodale and Alex Bardy were ambivalent about Green Goblin, calling it, "the kind of zine to get if you like bad-taste humour, silly stories, and lots of swear words! Though readable, not particularly funny. Okay for a light read but..."

In the June 1991 issue of Mouth of Sauron, Mark Nelson noted, "A zine which straddles boundaries is John Breakwell's Green Goblin. My admiration of this zine stems from the path it has taken through the years as John's interests change. The potpourri of books, roleplaying, comics, computers & chat is not unusual. Green Goblin stands out because along its travels it has collected a range of fans from different fandoms and different backgrounds. This is reflected in the letter-column."

== Awards ==
At the 1984 Games Day Awards organized by Games Workshop, Tempestuous Orifice placed third in the category "Best Fanzine".
