= Hip spica cast =

Type of orthopedic cast

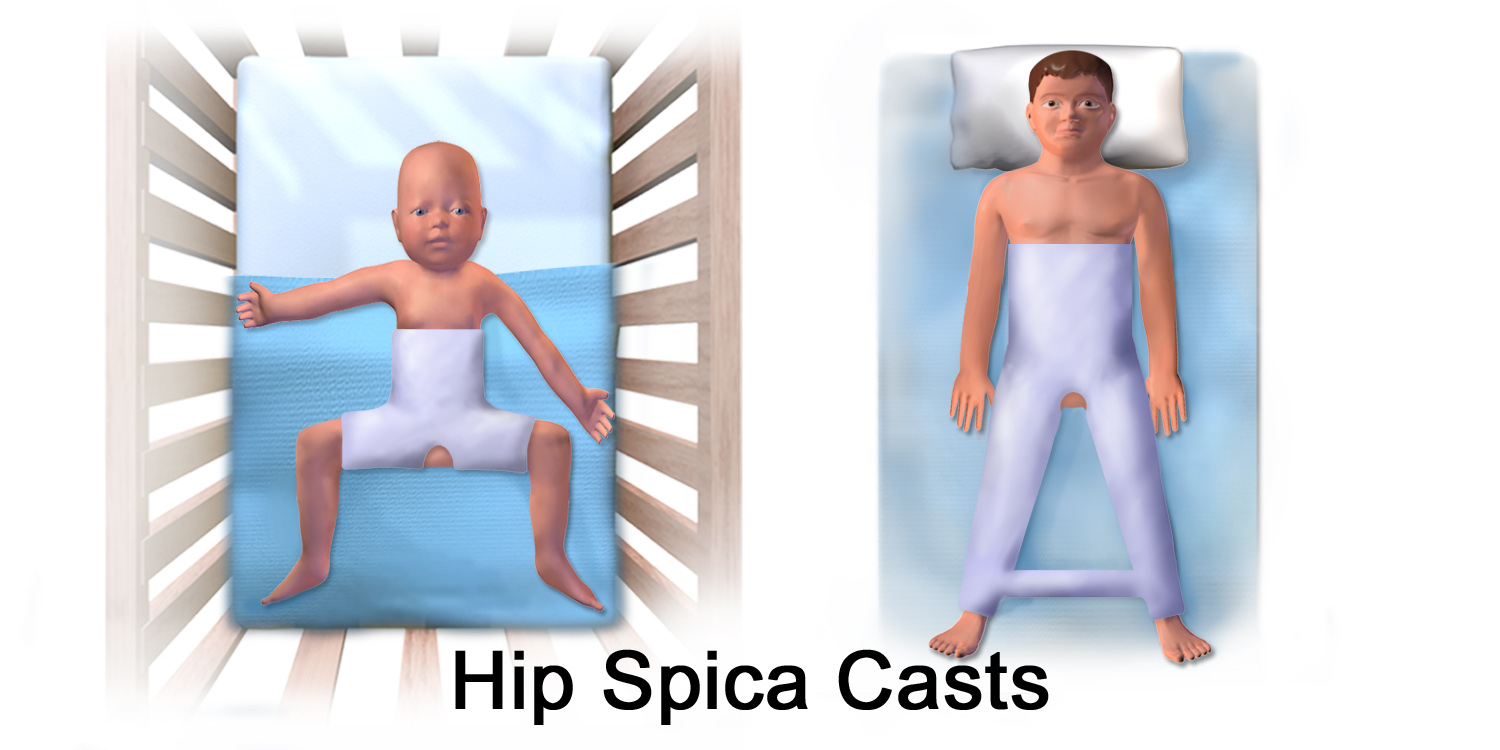
Illustration of two types of hip spica casts

A hip spica cast is a sort of orthopedic cast used to immobilize the hip or thigh. It is used to facilitate healing of injured hip joints or of fractured femora.

A hip spica includes the trunk of the body and one or both legs. A hip spica which covers only one leg to the ankle or foot may be referred to as a single hip spica, while one which covers both legs is called a double hip spica. A one-and-a-half hip spica encases one leg to the ankle or foot and the other to just above the knee. The extent to which the hip spica covers the trunk depends greatly on the injury and the surgeon; the spica may extend only to the navel, allowing mobility of the spine and the possibility of walking with the aid of crutches, or may extend to the rib cage or even to the armpits in some rare cases. Hip spicas were formerly common in reducing femoral fractures. Spica casts are used for treating hip dysplasia (developmental dislocation of hip).

Spica casts are typically made using a soft padded lining, which tightly wrapped around the leg and hip joint. It is then wrapped in either a fiberglass or plaster cast. Fiberglass is generally preferred, as it is stronger than plaster and significantly lighter. It also dries faster than plaster casts.

In some cases, a hip spica may only extend down one or more legs to above the knee. Such casts, called pantaloon casts, are occasionally seen to immobilize an injured lumbar spine or pelvis, in which case the trunk portion of the cast usually extends to the armpits.

Some spica casts also include a cross bar attached the legs near the knee or calf to add additional stability. Spica casts have a large opening in the front and back to allow the wearer to use the toilet. For babies, the opening is large enough to tuck a diaper on the inside, and then an additional diaper is worn over the cast to keep the inside diaper in place. Many casts also include a Gore-Tex lining, which is similar to the texture of a thin raincoat. It provides waterproofing on the inside of the cast and allows the inside to be wiped down with wipes or water as needed.
