= Journal of the Senseless Carnage Society =

British RPG zine

- Cover of Issue #10
- Editor: Simon Hartley
- Categories: Fantasy role-playing games
- Country: United Kingdom
- Based in: Epsom, Surrey

Journal of the Senseless Carnage Society was a British zine published in the mid-1980s that featured articles and scenarios about fantasy and science fiction role-playing.

== History ==
Journal of the Senseless Carnage Society was a fantasy RPG zine produced by Simon Hartley in Epsom, Surrey that focused on fantasy role-playing games. Articles included how to be a better gamemaster, fantasy world economics, and an unarmed combat system for AD&D. Regular offerings included a letters column, scenarios for role-playing games such as Chivalry & Sorcery and Traveller, a comic strip, and short fiction. By Issue 10, the zine was 32 digest-sized pages in length.

== Reception ==
Paul Cockburn, writing for the British RPG magazine Imagine, noted that the zine had lost three of its four editors in the first year of publication, but thought the quality of content "shows that it is more than just another pretty name ... worth trying at least once."

Writing in Abyss, Dave Nalle noted, "Most good fanzines try to present interesting content in a personal and interesting way. Too often a fanzine will concentrate on the content and become dry. The very name of the Journal of the Senseless Carnage Society gives away its problem: It went to the opposite extreme and is all character with almost no content." Nalle thought the art and printing quality were "pretty awful ... Some of the titles are even hand-written, so if flash is what you want, look elsewhere." Nalle found the Traveller scenario "pretty sketchy", but felt the zine had "a good strong feel to it and this at least partially makes up for the lack of more concrete material." Nalle concluded by giving this zine a rating of 5 out of 10, saying, "The JSCS will appeal to some readers and might well be worth checking out. It isn't heavy reading, but it can be fun and sometimes even edifying."

== Reviews ==
- Imagine #7
- Imagine #9
- Imagine #15
- Imagine #22
- Imagine #25

== See ==
- List of British role-playing zines
