= Dead Elf =

British RPG zine

- Cover of Issue #2
- Editor: Andrew Fisher; Graeme Anderson
- Categories: Role-playing games
- Country: United Kingdom
- Based in: Hitchin, Hertfordshire

Dead Elf was a British zine published in the mid-1980s that featured articles and scenarios about fantasy and horror role-playing.

== Description ==
Dead Elf was a fantasy RPG zine produced by Andrew Fisher and Graeme Anderson in Hitchin, Hertfordshire that focused on fantasy and horror role-playing games. Regular offerings included a letters column, reviews, and scenarios for role-playings games such as Call of Cthulhu and RuneQuest. By Issue 4, the zine was 32 digest-sized pages in length.

== Reception ==
Paul Cockburn, writing for the British RPG magazine Imagine, called the Call of Cthulhu scenario in Issue #2 "fairly large and well written." Cockburn felt that the editor was "still feeling his way around publishing a zine and is still having some problems with the layout and content." Nonetheless Cockburn found the zine "very readable, even contentious in places!" Cockburn concluded, "there's no reason why it shouldn't improve rapidly."

Writing in Abyss, Dave Nalle noted, "The production values are a bit better than average, but none too flashy. Some of the art is passable, and the print is in clear." Nalle pointed out that this zine "consists almost entirely of modules with a few reviews and letters thrown in ... it does have a nice feel and there is clearly an effort to provide some quality and variety." Although Nalle noted that much of the material was amusing, he thought that the humor "tends to be sophomoric." Nalle concluded by giving this zine a rating of 4 out of 10, saying, "Dead Elf looks like it has the potential to develop into something worthwhile, but as it stands it does not really stand out from the crowd, so I'll neither recommend it or warn you off."

== Reviews ==
- Imagine #26
- Imagine #28
