= The Gamer's Connection =

Game magazine

The Gamer's Connection is a game magazine that was published by Gold Rush Games.

== Publication history ==
In 1992, Mark Arsenault founded M.T.A. Graphics in order to publish The Gamer's Connection, a fanzine about role-playing games "For Sacramento Area RPG Enthusiasts". Shortly afterwards, M.T.A. Graphics was renamed Gold Rush Games, and the company turned The Gamer's Connection into a tabloid newsletter with national distribution that was published quarterly.

In 1995, the magazine cost $8 for a year's subscription.

== Reception ==
In the June 1995 edition of Dragon (Issue 218), Rick Swan bemoaned the state of smaller magazines in the United States, saying, "Too many small press publications serve as repositories for whiny editorials and amateur hour fiction that wouldn’t pass muster in an eighth grade English class." Swan then called The Gamer's Connection "a pleasant surprise." He lauded it for being "packed with news, features, and reviews, intelligently written and edited." He concluded with a recommendation, saying, "At two bucks an issue, it's a steal."
