= Evermist =

Cover art by Jeff Adams for the Fall 1976 edition (vol.2 Iss#4)

Evermist was a fanzine that began publication in 1974.

== Publication history ==
Evermist was a chapbook-sized fanzine that featured poetry and short stories with a fantasy theme, as well as reviews and letters. It was published by David Warren of Labelle, Florida from Spring 1975 to Summer 1978.

Volume 3, No. 1 (Winter 1976) was a special Tolkien edition; a copy has been added to the Sumner Gary Hunnewell Collection of Tolkien-related fanzines at Marquette University.

== Reception ==
In Issue #6 of The Strategic Review, Gary Gygax noted that some of the published poetry was "excellent", and thought that the reproduction was "good to fair." On a scale of Major Tragedy to Major Triumph, Gygax rated the fanzine a Minor Triumph.
