= Alien Star =

Science-fiction role-playing magazine

- Alien Star issue 4 (1981)
- Founder: Robert McMahon; John Roberts
- Founded: 1981
- Final issue Number: 1982; 8
- Country: UK
- Language: English

Alien Star was a fanzine for Traveller.

== Description ==
Alien Star was a fanzine from England that focused exclusively on Traveller, and included new adventures, supplements to the game rules, ships and equipment intended for the game.

== Reception ==
William A. Barton reviewed Alien Star in The Space Gamer No. 45. Barton commented that "If you're a real Traveller fanatic, you'll definitely find much of interest in Alien Star."
