= Molly Bawn (novel) =

1878 novel by Margaret Wolfe Hungerford

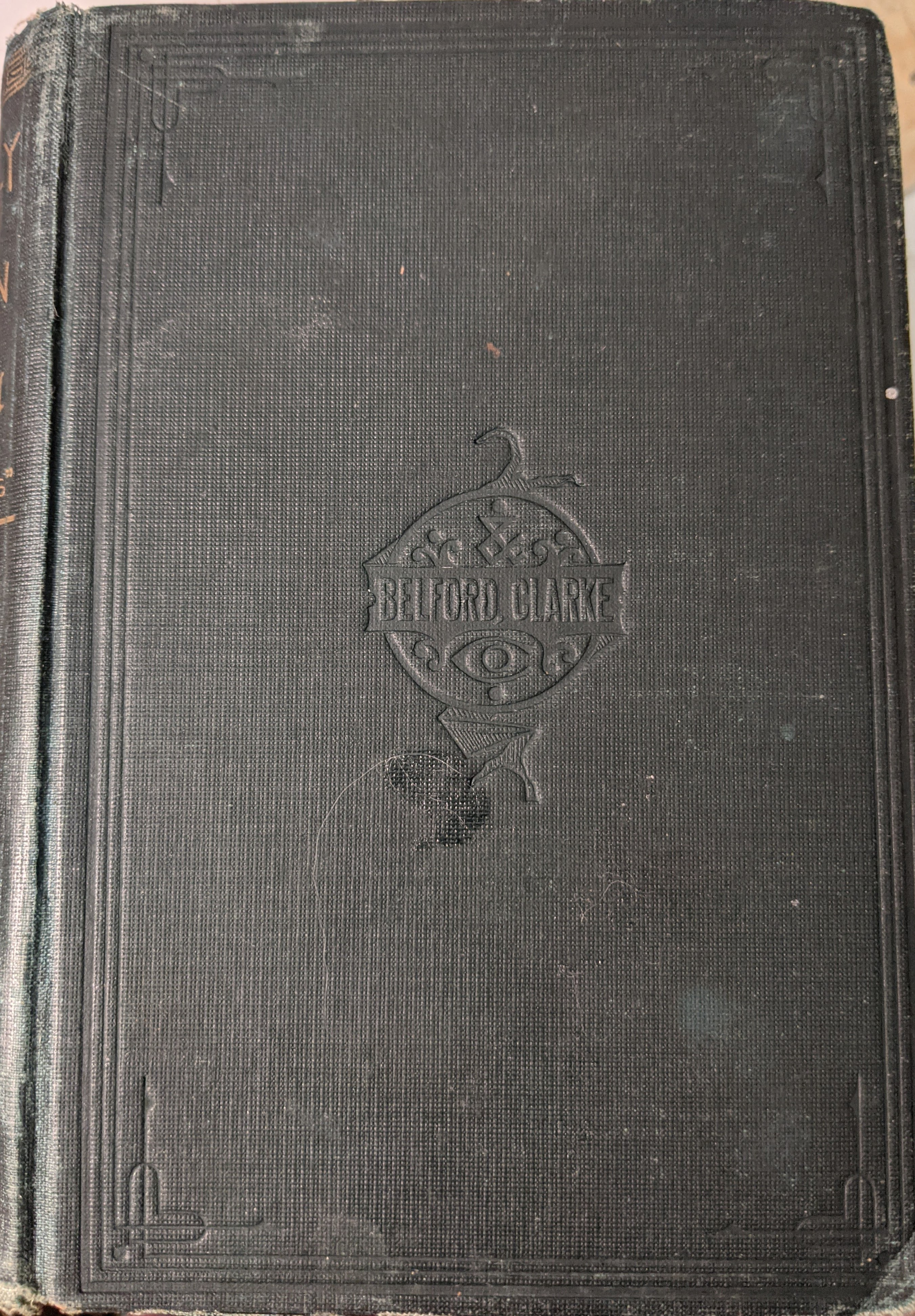
- Author: Margaret Wolfe Hungerford
- Language: English
- Genre: Drama
- Publication date: 1878
- Publication place: Ireland
- Media type: Print

Molly Bawn is an 1878 novel by the Irish writer Margaret Wolfe Hungerford. In 1916 it was adapted into a silent film of the same title starring Alma Taylor.

Molly Bawn, Hungerford's best-known novel, is the story of a frivolous, petulant Irish girl. She is a flirt who arouses her lover's jealousy and naively ignores social conventions. Mrs. Hungerford and this book are mentioned in chapter 18 of James Joyce's Ulysses:

...Molly bawn she gave me by Mrs Hungerford on account of the name I don't like books with a Molly in them like that one he brought me about the one from Flanders...

Molly Bawn contains Hungerford's most famous proverb: "Beauty is in the eye of the beholder."

== Bibliography ==
- Goble, Alan. The Complete Index to Literary Sources in Film. Walter de Gruyter, 1999.
