= Gamelog =

Gamelog Issue 72, June 1986

Predecessor publication Great Plains Game Players Newsletter, Issue 9, May 1974

Gamelog was a game magazine that was published and edited by James M. Lurvey.

== Publication history ==
Gamelog was a fanzine based out of Belcourt, North Dakota that focussed on wargaming and role-playing games. Its founder, James (Jim) Lurvey, originally titled it Great Plains Game Players Newsletter when he was a part of a wargaming group called the Great Plains Game Players (GPGP) based at the University of South Dakota. Lurvey later changed the zine's title to Gamelog when he moved to Belcourt.

The magazine was typewritten and duplicated on 8.5" x 11" paper, with hand-drawn maps. Lurvey capped the page count of each issue at 10 pages; if he had content that was longer than ten pages, he combined issues together. An example was Gamelog 40, 41 & 42, issued together as 30 pages of content.

In 1975, each issue was $0.30; an annual subscription cost $2.50. By 1983, the costs had increased to $0.75 and $7.50 respectively.

During Dave Arneson's litigation against Gary Gygax and TSR regarding D&D royalties, Arneson submitted copies of the Great Plains Game Players Newsletter as exhibits.

== Reception ==
In the inaugural issue of The Strategic Review (Spring 1975), Gary Gygax mentioned the Great Plains Game Players Newsletter as a having "both regional informations [sic] and a fair amount of fantasy material besides other interesting articles." In Issue 4, Gygax mentioned the magazine again, saying that it "carries a fair amount of D&D material."

Five years later, in the January 1980 edition of Dragon (Issue #33), Gygax called the re-titled Gamelog "outstanding", mentioning that it was "a good-looking amateur effort." Gygax admitted that a lot of the content, containing news and events specific to the American Midwest, would be of more interest to gamers who lived in that region, "while to most others the bulk of each issue is only midlly interesting — unless you become involved in the activities through participation on some level." Gygax was especially impressed by a roleplaying game printed in Issue 40–42 called Guerilla, and gave that combined issue a strong recommendfation for all readers, saying, "At a cover price of only $1.50, you cannot afford to pass them up."

In the September–October 1983 edition of The General (Vol. 20, Issue 3), Gamelog was called a "folksy 'zine" from "the wilds of North Dakota". The reviewer concluded "If a rambling, easy-going approach to your gaming interests is to your taste, take a look at Gamelog."
