= Vacuous Grimoire =

British RPG zine

- Cover of Issue No. 3
- Editor: Richard Roberts
- Categories: Role-playing games
- Country: United Kingdom
- Based in: Eastleigh

Vacuous Grimoire was a British zine published in the mid-1980s that featured adventure scenarios for fantasy role-playing games.

== Description ==
Vacuous Grimoire was published by Richard Roberts in Eastleigh and focused on fantasy role-playing games. Issues were 32 digest-sized pages in length. Content was mainly articles about role-playing and reviews, as well as adventure scenarios; unlike other RPG zines of the time, Vacuous Grimoire did not have a letters column.

== Reception ==
Paul Cockburn and Mike Lewis reviewed various issue of Vacuous Grimoire in the pages of Imagine:

- #1: "Vacuous Grimoire 1 shows promise, although there are some horrendous empty pages. The [included] scenario was quite good; there may be better things to come from this later."
- #2: "It is longer, better produced and an improvement on #1. [But] The magazine still lacks any strong content, being a mixture of poor D&D game and computer articles."
- #3: "This zine is still improving. The series of article on writing computer adventure games continues, and it should prove useful to anyone who is considering writing one. There are the rules for a new game called Darts, part 2 of "The Palace of Thorgon", an AD&D adventure, plus reviews, etc. All in all, not a bad magazine."

Dave Nalle, writing in Abyss, felt there was not enough content, writing "All things considered, the name is rather well chosen." Reviewing Issue #3, Nalle noted that it "consists almost entirely of modules, bad art and white space." Nalle concluded, "On the whole, I really can't recommend Vacuous Grimoire ... If you plan to look at only a limited number of UK zines, don't bother to make this one of them."
