= Miser's Hoard (zine) =

British role-playing game fanzine

- Cover of Miser's Hoard No. 7
- Editor: John and Ian McKeown
- Categories: Fantasy role-playing games
- Country: United Kingdom
- Based in: Upminster

Miser's Hoard was a British zine published in the 1980s that focussed on fantasy role-playing games such as Dungeons & Dragons.

== Description ==
Miser's Hoard was a fanzine published by John and Ian McKeown in Upminster, Essex in the early 1980s. The subject matter was fantasy role-playing games, oriented in particular to D&D, RuneQuest and Traveller.

A typical issue featured articles, adventure scenarios, variant rules, readers' letters, columns, a section about metal miniatures, and an editorial.

== Reception ==
In Issue 30 of Abyss (Summer 1984), Dave Nalle commented "The art and appearance are not great, but the reproduction and presentation are fairly good." Nalle thought the adventure scenarios were "well put together", especially a scenario published in Issue 4, based on a story by Enid Blyton. Nalle found "The mood of Miser's Horde is fairly relaxed and engaging, though not as raucous and humorous as DragonLords." Nalle concluded by giving this zine a 4 (out of 10) for appearance, a 5 for content, 7 for value, and an overall rating of 6, saying, "Miser's Horde looks like a nice small magazine with a future."

In Issue 18 of the British games magazine Imagine, Paul Cockburn called it "one of the UK's leading fantasy zines." Cockburn noted, "Though perhaps lacking in a little character, MH still comes up with lots of good material. It has plenty of discussion plus articles for the AD&D, RuneQuest and Traveller games."

== Reviews ==
- Imagine #4
- Imagine #8
- Imagine #11
- Imagine #13
- Imagine #20
