= Dennis L. McKiernan =

American writer (born 1932)

- Born: Dennis Lester McKiernan; April 4, 1932 (age 94); Moberly, Missouri, U.S.
- Education: University of Missouri (BS); Duke University Pratt School of Engineering (MS)
- Writing career
- Genre: Science fiction

Dennis Lester McKiernan (born April 4, 1932) is an American writer best known for his high fantasy The Iron Tower. His genres include high fantasy (set in various fictitious worlds), science fiction, horror fiction, and crime fiction. His primary setting, Mithgar, was originally meant to host Middle-Earth stories that were sequels to Tolkien's work. It has since grown to reflect a much broader variety of influences, including "fairy tales and Oz books and folk tales and other such stories".

== Biography ==
McKiernan was born in Moberly, Missouri, where he lived until he served the U.S. Air Force for four years, stationed within US territory during the Korean War. After military service, he attended the University of Missouri and received a BS in electrical engineering in 1958 and an MS in the same field from Duke University in 1964. He worked as an engineer at AT&T, initially at Western Electric but soon at Bell Laboratories, from 1958 until 1989. In 1989, after early retirement from engineering, McKiernan began writing on a full-time basis.

In 1977, while riding his motorcycle, McKiernan was hit by a car that had crossed the center-line, and he was confined to a bed, first in traction and then in a hip spica cast, for many months. During his recuperation, he began writing a sequel to J. R. R. Tolkien's The Lord of the Rings. The publisher Doubleday showed an interest in his work and tried to obtain authorization from Tolkien's estate but was denied. Doubleday then asked McKiernan to rewrite his story, placing the characters in a different fictitious world, and also to write a prequel supporting it. The prequel, of necessity, resembles The Lord of the Rings; the decision of Doubleday to issue the work as a trilogy increased that resemblance; and some critics have seen McKiernan as simply imitating Tolkien's epic work. McKiernan has subsequently developed stories in the series that followed along a story line different from those that plausibly could have been taken by Tolkien.

McKiernan's Faery Series expands tales drawn from Andrew Lang's Fairy Books, additionally tying the selected tales together with a larger plot.

McKiernan currently lives in Tucson, Arizona.

== Works ==
=== Mithgar series ===
- The Iron Tower (Omnibus edition 2000)
  - The Dark Tide (1984)
  - Shadows of Doom (1984)
  - The Darkest Day (1984)
- The Silver Call (Omnibus edition 2001)
  - Trek to Kraggen-Cor (1986)
  - The Brega Path (1986)
- Dragondoom (1990)
- Tales from the One-Eyed Crow: The Vulgmaster (short story adapted as a graphic novel by David Keller and Alex Niño) (1991)
- The Eye of the Hunter (1992)
- Voyage of the Fox Rider (1993)
- Tales of Mithgar (1994)
- The Dragonstone (1996)
- Hèl's Crucible Duology
  - Into the Forge (1997)
  - Into the Fire (1998)
- Silver Wolf, Black Falcon (2000)
- Red Slippers: More Tales of Mithgar (2004)
- City of Jade (2008)
- Stolen Crown (2014)

=== Faery Series ===
- Once Upon a Winter's Night (2001)
- Once Upon a Summer Day (2005)
- Once Upon an Autumn Eve (2006)
- Once Upon a Spring Morn (October 2006)
- Once Upon a Dreadful Time (October 2007)

=== The Black Foxes Series ===
- Caverns of Socrates (1995) (re-published as Shadowtrap in ebook format, 2014)
- Shadowprey (2014)

=== Standalone Novels ===
- At the Edge of the Forest (2012)

=== Other works ===
==== Anthologized short stories ====
- “The Ornament” in The Magic of Christmas (1990) edited by John Silbersack and Christopher Schelling
- “Straw into Gold: Part II” with Mark A. Kreighbaum in Dragon Fantastic (1992) edited by Rosalind M. Greenberg, Martin H. Greenberg and Tad Williams
- "The Halfling House" in After the King (1992) edited by Martin H. Greenberg
- "The Source of It All" in Alien Pregnant by Elvis (1994) edited by Esther M. Friesner
- "Alas, Me Bleedin..." in Weird Tales from Shakespeare (1994) edited by Katharine Kerr and Martin H. Greenberg
- "The Sorcerer's Apprentice" in The Shimmering Door (1996) edited by Katharine Kerr
- "I Sing the Dark Riders" in Elf Fantastic (1997) edited by Martin H. Greenberg
- "The Lesser of..." in Highwaymen: Robbers & Rogues (1997) edited by Jennifer Roberson
- "In the Service of Mages" in Wizard Fantastic (1997) edited by Martin H. Greenberg
- "Of Tides and Time" in Wizard Fantastic (1997) edited by Martin H. Greenberg
- "The Divine Comedy" in Olympus (1998) edited by Martin H. Greenberg and Bruce D. Arthurs
- "Final Conquest" in Legends: Tales from the Eternal Archives #1 (1999) edited by Margaret Weis
- "Darkness" in 999: New Stories of Horror and Suspense (1999) edited by Al Sarrantonio
- "For the Life of Sheila Morgan" in Spell Fantastic (2000) edited by Martin H. Greenberg and Larry Segriff
- "Perfidy" in Treachery and Treason (2000) edited by Laura Anne Gilman and Jennifer Heddle
- "A Tower with No Doors" in Flights: Extreme Visions of Fantasy (2004) edited by Al Sarrantonio
