= The Iron Tower =

Fantasy series by Dennis L. McKiernan

Omnibus edition

The Iron Tower Trilogy consists of the first three Mithgar novels (The Dark Tide, Shadows of Doom, and The Darkest Day) by Dennis L. McKiernan. Though not originally written as a trilogy, the novels were published as The Iron Tower Trilogy by Doubleday.

== Plot ==
=== The Dark Tide ===
The first novel of The Iron Tower Trilogy opens during an unnaturally long and bitter winter that has fallen over all of Mithgar, and there are rumors of Vulg attacks on Warrow farms. So in the Boskydells, all young male Warrows are training to become Thornwalkers and watch over their homeland. Tuck Underbank, Danner Bramblethorn and several others pack up and depart, leaving behind Tuck's dammia (girlfriend/lover) and all their families.

After a lethal encounter with some Vulgs, which kills one of their number, the Warrows and their new leader Patrel Rushlock arrive at the Spindle Ford and take up their guard duties. A messenger arrives from the king's fortress Challerain Keep, revealing that Modru of Gron is attacking the peoples of Mithgar, and asking the Boskydell for some help. Unfortunately he and a friend of Tuck's are killed when a Vulg attacks, knocking them into a frozen river. Tuck is the only one who survives.

Danner, Tuck and Patrel are among the Warrows who go to Challerain Keep, where they become acquainted with High King Aurion Redeye, his son Prince Igon, his future daughter-in-law Princess Laurelin, as well as the elf lord Gildor Goldbranch and Hrosmarshal Vidron. They also are invited to Laurelin's nineteenth birthday party, but during the party a messenger arrives, saying that the fortress is about to be attacked.

Tuck and the Warrows take part in the battle against Modru's Horde, but he becomes lost and ends up inside a crypt with the crown prince, Galen, where Tuck retrieves a small red arrow. He and Galen manage to escape the slaughter as Challerain Keep is destroyed, and end up in an elven village where they are cared for and fed. But then it is revealed that Igon was found unconscious in the snow nearby, and Gildor arrives to say that Aurion is dead.

=== Shadows of Doom ===
The second novel of The Iron Tower Trilogy opens with an extended description of Laurelin's capture by Modru's forces. She is alternately treated well and brutally, being carefully bathed and then tossed into a dungeon with a disgusting monster outside. She also witnesses the torture and murder of an Elf named Vanidor, Gildor's twin brother.

Tuck and Galen make the reluctant decision to go rally their allies instead of rescuing Laurelin, and Gildor comes with them. They also pick up a dwarf named Brega, the last of a dwarf brigade who slaughtered and were slaughtered by the Foul Folk. He leads them to the ancient dwarf mine of Kraggen-Cor, where they are almost killed by a monstrous tentacled creature, especially since Gildor collapses when he senses Vanidor's death.

They carefully make their way through Kraggen-Cor, but are confronted by a Gargon at the far end, who petrifies them with fear. Tuck distracts it by stabbing the back of its leg, allowing the others to finish it off and escape. On the other side, they encounter yet more elves, who give them replacement weaponry.

Meanwhile, Danner and Patrel return to the Boskydells, which they find in ruins, and with several dead. With Merrilee's help, they destroy the invading Ghuls and reclaim their homeland.

However, they have not managed to reclaim Mithgar from Modru, nor have they succeeded in rescuing Laurelin.

=== The Darkest Day ===
The third novel of The Iron Tower Trilogy finds Merrilee and Tuck reunited just as the armies march off to Gron to destroy Modru, who is planning to return his master Gyphon from his exile. He is also using the Myrkenstone, a large unexplained meteor, to cover Mithgar in darkness so that his hordes won't be affected by sunlight. Despite this lack of advantage, the good guys attack the fortress and manage to break in, but Danner falls victim to a berserker attack and is killed opening the gates.

Tuck infiltrates the Iron Tower and remembering an old rhyme Laurelin once recited, he shoots his red arrow at the Myrkenstone, killing Modru and trapping Gyphon. However, the blast of light destroys Tuck's vision, both ordinary and "special." He and Laurelin are rescued, but Rael is unable to heal him. The Warrows return to the Boskydells after burying Danner, and help rebuild their homes.

In the years that follow, Tuck marries Merrilee and has one daughter. Galen marries Laurelin, and Patrel becomes a famous bard who composes a lengthy ode about the Iron Tower and what happened there. Gildor and Rael leave Mithgar for Adonar, because of the trauma of Vanidor's death.

Tuck, still blinded, is heralded as a hero for the rest of his life. He dies at a ripe old age, seeing Danner in the afterlife.

== Reception ==
Kirkus Reviews dismissed all three books:

- The Dark Tide: "Yet another abject Tolkien imitation. ... Derivative and dreadful."
- Shadows of Doom: "... the second part of McKiernan's abject, meaningless Tolkien imitation. ... The non-Tolkien bits are thoughtless and creaky. In sum: inferior fantasy in almost every respect."
- The Darkest Day: "Less slavishly Tolkienesque than Vols. I and II (notwithstanding the pretentious appendices), but otherwise the shabby formula [sic]--long dull speeches, endless cliches, juvenile doings--as before: for devotees only."

E.S. Erkes reviewed The Iron Tower series for Different Worlds magazine and stated that "So many of the little cultural details that brought The Lord of the Rings to life are missing here: McKiernan's songs and poems, for example, are pretty awful. The overall effect is comparable to looking at the work of an illustrator who learned to draw not by taking art lessons but by studying Saturday Evening Post covers. But nonetheless I recommend this work highly. There are scenes here which will make you feel the same way you felt the first time you read Tolkien, and I can't think of higher praise for a trilogy such as this."

A Black Gate reviewer, while conceding that "The Iron Tower Trilogy is, in fact, The Lord of the Rings with the serial numbers filed off. Crudely. Anyone who possesses even a passing familiarity with Tolkien's masterwork should stand aghast at the 'similarities'", admitted "I recently re-read The Dark Tide on a whim and liked it, finding it to be a mildly entertaining popcorn read."
