= The Beholder (magazine) =

U.K. role-playing game magazine

Cover of Issue 1

The Beholder is a role-playing game magazine that was edited and published in the United Kingdom.

== Publication history ==
The Beholder was a monthly role-playing game magazine first published in 1979, edited by Mike Stoner. Issues were 8.5 in × 6 in (220 mm × 150 mm) in size, with covers printed on coloured stock. Articles were generally about Advanced Dungeons & Dragons including campaign development, variant types of combat, and new monsters, as well as some fiction and opinion pieces. Contributors included Mike Stoner (the editor), Don Turnbull, and Dave Davies.

== Awards ==
The Beholder was awarded "Best Games Fanzine" at the Games Day convention in 1980.

== Reviews ==
In the June 1981 edition of Dragon (Issue #50), David Nalle found that "The quality of thought in The Beholder is surprisingly even. Articles tend to be very average. There are few real losers, and likewise few examples of brilliance." Nalle found the weakest articles to be about monsters, but the 'zine was "strong in articles on campaign expansion, and in the small scenarios of a page or two in length which appear in each issue." Nalle concluded that The Beholder lacked the ability to grab the reader's attention, saying it "does not catch the eye and imagination and shout for instant incorporation in the reader’s next dungeon."

In Issue 13 of Abyss, Jon Schuller noted that some of the articles in Issue 20 were "quite interesting," but noted its focus was almost exclusively AD&D, commenting "The usual things are covered, such as monsters and magic items." Schuller concluded, "It is an interesting zine, and at least worth taking a look at."
