= Demon's Drawl =

British RPG zine 1983–1985

- Cover of Demon's Drawl No. 12
- Editor: Jeremy Nuttall
- Categories: Fantasy role-playing games
- Circulation: 400
- Founded: 1984
- Final issue: 1987
- Country: United Kingdom
- Based in: Congleton, Cheshire

Demon's Drawl was a British zine published 1983–1985 that featured articles about fantasy role-playing and play-by-mail (PBM) games. It continued for another two years under the title Telegraph Road before being discontinued in 1987.

== History ==
In the early 1980s, Jeremy Nuttall was a member of the Chaos Tribe Fantasy RPG Club in Congleton, Cheshire. Members of the club had created a fantasy role-playing campaign world called Galadra. In July 1983, Nuttall launched Demon's Drawl, a zine that focussed on Galadra, as well as other role-playing games. By Issue 3, the zine had reached 44 digest-sized pages, and was sold in hobby & game stores in England as well as by subscription.

Games covered included RuneQuest, Dungeons & Dragons, Middle-earth Role Playing and Call of Cthulhu. Some articles were generic and could be used with any role-playing game, such as "classless systems", "the morality in role-playing", and "fantasy economics." Letters from readers and reviews were also included, and many issues featured an RPG adventure scenario.

Starting with Issue 8, the zine also became a base for PBM games.

In July 1985, after 15 issues, Nuttall renamed the zine Telegraph Road. Nuttall had become a Christian, and the focus of the magazine changed to articles about Nuttall's "Ultimate RPG", as well as a music column, and discussions of Nuttall's newfound faith. The newly titled magazine was no longer sold in stores, but only by subscription. Telegraph Road ran for a further 11 issues, until November 1987.

== Reception ==
Jonathan Aird, writing in Alarums & Excursions, was unimpressed with the second issue, saying, "I wish I didn't have it. It is about the most uninteresting zine I have. There is an uninspired AD&D adventure, some very plain magic items ... There are some fairly decent new spells and a couple of okay articles."

The British RPG magazine Imagine regularly carried reviews of Demon's Drawl:

- Imagine #11: Paul Cockburn noted that Issue 3 of Demon's Drawl, compared to other British zines of the time, "also [carries] 'games additions' material, but leavened with more news, reviews, and chat." Cockburn noted that the zine had recently expanded to 44 digest-sized pages, and felt that it represented good value for its price.
- Imagine #15: Cockburn called Issue 5 of Demon's Drawl "impressive" and felt that it showed "Jeremy Nuttall [is] beginining to forge a real identity for this 'zine. New monsters, a good scenario and a developing letters section. DD could be going places."
- Imagine #17: Mike Lewis called the content of Demon's Drawl #6 "rapidly improving ... It still carries a lot of 'hardware' in the form of monsters, magic items and scenarios for the AD&D game, but it mixes this with useful articles as well. Value for money."
- Imagine #21: Lewis thought the 8th issue of Demon's Drawl was "still improving in leaps and bounds — from simple beginnings... At 44 pages it is also excellent value for money."

Writing in Abyss, Dave Nalle called Issue 13 "skilfully organized ... Articles contain a good bit more thought than might be expected." Nalle called the included RPG adventure "imaginative and original, both in style and content." Nalle also found the letter and review columns "up to standard and contain some interesting discussion." Overall, Nalle found that "Almost all the material is generally suited to FRPing and worth checking out. The chat and content are balanced out well so that you get a feeling that you are reading an active and living zine." Nalle concluded by giving the zine a rating of 7 out of 10, saying, "From what I have seen, it is as good or better than any fanzine currently being published in the UK."

== Reviews ==
- Imagine #9
- Imagine #13
- Imagine #19
- Imagine #24

== Awards ==
In a 1985 reader's poll conducted by the British magazine Adventurer to determine the most popular RPG fanzines in Britain, Demon's Drawl placed first. A year later, the renamed zine Telegraph Road placed fifth.
