= List of Tolkien societies =

Dedicated Tolkien societies provide platforms for a combination of Tolkien fandom and academic Tolkien studies in several countries.

== Societies by country ==
=== United States ===
The first recorded organized Tolkien fan group was "The Fellowship of the Ring", founded by Ted Johnstone. Their first annual meeting was held at Pittcon, the 1960 Worldcon. They published four issues of the fanzine i-Palantír before the organization disbanded; the first was published a month before the Pittcon meeting, dated August 1960.

The Tolkien Society of America first met "in February, 1965, beside the statue of Alma Mater on the Columbia University campus," according to a 1967 New York Times interview with Richard Plotz, the society's founder and first Thain. By 1967, Meskys had become Thain and the society boasted over 1,000 members, organized into local groups or smials, a pattern that would be followed by other Tolkien fan organizations. The society published a newsletter, Green Dragon, and The Tolkien Journal (edited by Plotz). In 1969, the society sponsored the first Tolkien Conference at Belknap College. The Tolkien Conference was not a science fiction convention but a scholarly event. The University of Wisconsin Tolkien and Fantasy Society was founded in 1966, and is best known for its journal Orcrist (1966–1977), edited by Richard C. West. Across the continent, Glen GoodKnight founded the Mythopoeic Society in California in 1967 for the study, discussion, and enjoyment of fantastic and mythic literature, especially the works of Tolkien and fellow-Inklings C. S. Lewis, and Charles Williams. The society held its first Mythcon conference in 1970, which featured readings, a costume competition, an art show, and other events typical of science fiction conventions of the day. The society's three current periodicals are Mythprint, a monthly bulletin; Mythlore, originally a fanzine and now a peer-reviewed journal that publishes scholarly articles on mythic and fantastic literature; and The Mythic Circle, a literary annual of original poetry and short stories (which replaced the society's earlier publications Mythril and Mythellany). Alongside that was a monthly newsletter, Mythprint. Beyond Bree is the monthly newsletter of The American Mensa Tolkien Special Interest Group.

=== United Kingdom ===
The Tolkien Society (UK) was founded in the United Kingdom in 1969, and remains active as a registered charity. The society has two regular publications, a bi-monthly bulletin of news and information, Amon Hen, and an annual journal, Mallorn; this began informally but switched to scholarly articles on Tolkien's work. They host annual events, including a conference held at Oxford, Oxonmoot. The society has three regular UK gatherings: an Annual General Meeting and Dinner; a Seminar with a mix of serious and lighthearted talks; and the Oxonmoot, a regular September gathering organized by the British Tolkien Society. The society's journal is Mallorn. It consists of long articles studying aspects of Tolkien's work, plus some artwork. The name is a reference to the Mallorn tree and an illustration of such a tree appears on the front of each issue. In the past it was issued every autumn, but since 2003 has been released in mid-summer.

=== German-speaking Europe ===
The German translation of The Hobbit appeared in 1957 (translated by Walter Scherf), and that of The Lord of the Rings in 1972 (translated by Margaret Carroux and Ebba-Margareta von Freymann).

The Deutsche Tolkien Gesellschaft (DTG) is a German association dedicated to the study of the life and works of J. R. R. Tolkien. Founded in 1997, it is based in Cologne. The DTG has more than 500 members (as of 2005) and is organized in a widespread network of local chapters. It is the main driving force of Tolkien reception in the German speaking countries (cf. Honegger (2006); the first Swiss Tolkien Society (Eredain) was founded in 1986 and published the Aglared journal; it dissolved in 2006 and a second Swiss Tolkien Society (Seryn Ennor) was founded in 2014 and is based in Jenins; an Austrian Tolkien Society was founded in 2002). The DTG organized a seminar on Tolkien studies in Cologne in 2004, in Jena in 2005 and in Mainz in 2006. The conference proceedings are published in their Hither Shore yearbook.

=== Hungary ===
The Magyar Tolkien Társaság (Hungarian Tolkien Society) is a registered public benefit organization whose aim is to enhance public knowledge on the works and mythology created by J. R. R. Tolkien. Apart from organizing the Hungarian Tolkien aficionados into a community (choir, charity ball, creative workshops), the association has grown multifaceted since its foundation in 2002, it provides professional and technical editorial support for new publications, publishes the semiannual magazine Lassi Laurië featuring scholarly articles, interviews, and literary works, and it organizes numerous conferences, meetings and summer camps. In 2002, for its tenth anniversary, the society organized a joint conference with the Institute of English Studies of Károli Gáspár University of the Reformed Church in Hungary entitled "J. R. R. Tolkien: Fantasy and Ethics" and published a book of studies containing the papers presented. The Magyar Tolkien Társaság maintains relations with other tertiary institutions such as the Department of History and Philosophy of Science of Eötvös Loránd University, together with whom it regularly launches courses on Tolkienian subjects ("J. R. R. Tolkien – A 20th Century Mythology")

=== Czech Republic ===
Společnost přátel díla pana J. R. R. Tolkiena (Society of Friends of the Works of J.R.R. Tolkien), often abbreviated SPDPJRRT, is the Tolkien Society in the Czech Republic founded in 1992 to commemorate the centenary of J.R.R. Tolkien's birthday. The members of the Society have the opportunity to gather at various meetings. The two main events organized by the society are: The Celebration of the Destruction of the Ring in the end of March and the Bilbo and Frodo's Birthday in September. In addition to that, there is another event called TolkienCon held in Prague annually in January since 2003. It is not officially organized by the Society, but the organizers are in close contact with the Society. It usually starts late afternoon on Friday and ends midday on Sunday. It is based at a school, including facilities for ‘sleeping rough’ in classrooms.

=== Slovakia ===
The main Slovak organization for fans of Tolkien's fiction is the non-profit civic association Spoločenstvo Tolkiena (The Fellowship of Tolkien), founded in 2002. Its main goal is to unite fans of Tolkien's works and discuss them, as well as discuss other related fantasy fiction by non-Tolkien authors. In the past, the association published its own irregular fanzine, dubbed Athelas. Other activities of the association include reenactment and live-action roleplaying, and between 2006 and 2019, serving as the co-founder and co-organiser of the annual Slovak fantasy fiction festival SlavCon (now run by its own dedicated association).

=== Nordic countries ===
==== Sweden ====
The Tolkien Society of Sweden was the first J. R. R. Tolkien society in Europe. It was started in Gothenburg, Sweden, in 1968 by members of Club Cosmos. They published the members' magazine Långbottenbladet. Originally it was just called "The Tolkien Society" but when the British society of the same name was created the members added "of Sweden" to its name.

The Tolkien Society Forodrim (Sindarin for "People of the North") was founded in Sweden in 1972 and is one of the oldest Tolkien fan organizations. The Forodrim was founded in a public toilet during a science fiction convention (possibly SF-Kongressen 1973) as a name change of Sam J Lundwall's Hyboria. Co-founders were Jörgen Peterzén and Anders Palm.

==== Denmark ====
In Denmark, Tolkien became well known in the 1970s; his works have since considerably influenced Danish language fantasy literature. In 1977, Queen Margrethe II of Denmark illustrated The Lord of the Rings. There are two Danish Tolkien societies; Bri, the Danish Tolkien Society, and the online Imladris community.

==== Norway ====
The Hobbit appeared in Norwegian translation in 1972 and The Lord of the Rings followed from 1973 to 1975 (Tiden Norsk Forlag). Both translations were harshly criticized for errors and inconsistencies and complaints resulted in a new translation of The Lord of the Rings, published in 1980/81. By the late 1980s, Tolkien's works were well known to the Norwegian public. A translation of the Silmarillion appeared in 1994. The unsatisfactory Hobbit translation was replaced only in 1997. By the mid-1990s, the popularity of Tolkien had risen to a level that made viable translations of his minor works.

Arthedain – The Tolkien Society of Norway was founded in Oslo in 1981.

==== Finland ====
The Finnish Tolkien Society Kontu (Note: Kontu is the Finnish translation of "The Shire".) (Suomen Tolkien-seura Kontu ry in Finnish) is a registered society based in Helsinki, Finland. The society was originally two different societies that unified at the beginning of 2012. The Finnish Tolkien Society (Suomen Tolkien seura) was founded on 3 January 1992 and Kontu Internet Community (Verkkoyhteisö Kontu ry) was founded on 19 December 2006. The main focus of the society is to improve knowledge of J. R. R. Tolkien and his works in Finland as well as to maintain the virtual community and thus the website the society originated from. The various parts of the website contain a discussion forum, a wiki and an IRC channel. KontuWiki has been credited in several Finnish Tolkien related publications since 2007. Every year the society awards the Kuvastaja-prize for the year's best Finnish Fantasy book. There is much smial-activity and the society organizes meetings and other events for Tolkien fans from all over the country.

=== Russia ===
Interest in Russia awoke soon after the publication of The Lord of the Rings in 1955, long before the first Russian translation. A first effort at publication was made in the 1960s, but to comply with literary censorship in Soviet Russia, the work was considerably abridged and transformed. The ideological danger of the book was seen in the "hidden allegory 'of the conflict between the individualist West and the totalitarian, Communist East.'", while, ironically, Marxist readings in the west conversely identified Tolkien's anti-industrial ideas as presented in the Shire with primitive communism, in a struggle with the evil forces of technocratic capitalism. Russian translations of The Lord of the Rings were published only after the collapse of the Soviet Union, but then in great numbers, no less than ten official Russian translations appeared between 1990 and 2005. Tolkien fandom in Russia grew especially rapidly during the early 1990s at Moscow State University. Many unofficial and partly fragmentary translations are in circulation. The first translation appearing in print was that by Kistyakovskij and Muravyov (volume 1, published 1982).

Notable fan works by Russian writers, which often take the form of alternative accounts or informal sequels to Tolkien's published works, include The Last Ringbearer (Последний кольценосец) by Kirill Eskov, and The Black Book of Arda ("Чёрная Книга Арды"). One of the authors of The Black Book of Arda derived her pen name from Nienna, the Vala Lady of Mercy: according to Mark T. Hooker, the work proved so influential in Russia following its 1992 release that "Niennism" emerged as a term used to describe both a "distinctive literary turn and intellectual following".

=== Japan ===
The Hobbit appeared in a Japanese translation in 1965 (Hobitto no Boken) and The Lord of the Rings from 1972 to 1975 (Yubiwa Monogatari), both translated by Teiji Seta (1916–1979); they were revised by Seta's assistant Akiko Tanaka in 1992. In 1982, Tanaka translated the Silmarillion (Sirumariru no Monogatari). Teiji Seta was an expert in classical Japanese literature and a haiku poet, and the Tolkien scholar Roberto Arduini regards the Seta and Tanaka translations as "almost perfect".

=== Greece ===
The Hobbit and Lord of the Rings were published in Greek by Kedros during the 1970s, each by different translators. In the mid-90s Aiolos published Silmarillion and Unfinished Tales. In 2001, shortly before the release of the movies, the first Greek on-line community was formed in a promotional web site which in 2002 founded an official group of fans under the name The Prancing Pony. The group is unofficially divided in two 'smials', in Athens and Thessaloniki.

=== Bulgaria ===
The Bulgarian Tolkien Society was officially established in 1998 when the Bulgarian Tolkien Fan Club Rin Ennor was first registered as a non-profit non-governmental organization by a few students from the Sofia University. Apart from the larger communities in the big cities, the Bulgarian Tolkien Society has local clubs and groups.

=== Turkey ===
Interest in Turkey awoke to The Lord of the Rings in the late 1980s, long before the first Turkish translation. A translation of The Lord of the Rings into Turkish was published as Yüzüklerin Efendisi in 1997. After the release of the movies, other Tolkien-related books such as The Silmarillion were translated into Turkish.

=== Pakistan ===
Interest in Prof Tolkien's work developed in Pakistan soon after its earliest inception as a separate nation and has existed sporadically over the years. Interest grew manifold after the release and completion of the Lord of the Rings film trilogy and in 2003–04, the 'Lahore Tolkien Reading Group' was established there.

=== Italy ===
The Italian Tolkien Society (Società Tolkeniana Italiana - STI) was founded in February 1994, after a series of lectures about Tolkien's thought and works made in Italy in 1992 by the Tolkien Society archivist, Patricia Reynolds, on the centenary of Tolkien's birth. She stimulated the creation of the new society, of which she became a godmother. Priscilla Tolkien also became an honorary partner. During the years the society managed to grow enough to have hundreds of members and a lot of constant activities. It publishes two six-monthly magazines (Terra di Mezzo and Minas Tirith) and organizes two competitions for narrative and images (The Silmaril Awards), from which various publications (such as the volume Frammenti della Terra di Mezzo, a collection of the best stories) are derived. In collaboration with Italian national publishers it also publishes illustrated calendars whose beauty been recognized not only in Italy but internationally as well, for example by HarperCollins (Tolkien's publishing house) that drawn some images from them for their book "Realms of Tolkien". Every year, in September, usually on its first weekend, they organize the Hobbiton, a great three-days feast with conferences, meetings, debates, concerts, dances, costume re-enactments, film screenings, treasure hunts and other Middle-Earth related activities. They also founded the Palantír publishing house.

In 2021, a pastry chef, Nicolas Gentile, bought a piece of land at Bucchianico in Abruzzo, and walked with friends in costume as the members of the Fellowship of the Ring to throw a ring into the crater of Mount Vesuvius. He has built a hobbit-style house and is seeking crowdfunding to build more. In his view, the people of the region "have always lived as hobbits" close to nature.

== Sources ==
- Arduini, Roberto (2006). "Japan: Reception of Tolkien". In Michael Drout (ed.). The J. R. R. Tolkien Encyclopedia. Routledge. pp. 310–311.
- Markova, Olga (2006). "Russia: Reception of Tolkien". In Michael Drout (ed.). The J. R. R. Tolkien Encyclopedia. Routledge. pp. 580–581.
