= Oxonmoot =

J. R. R. Tolkien conference in Oxford, UK

- Genre: Literary conference, fan convention
- Venue: Varies (different colleges of the University of Oxford)
- Locations: Oxford, England
- Inaugurated: September 1974
- Attendance: 200–300
- Organiser: The Tolkien Society
- Website: oxonmoot.org

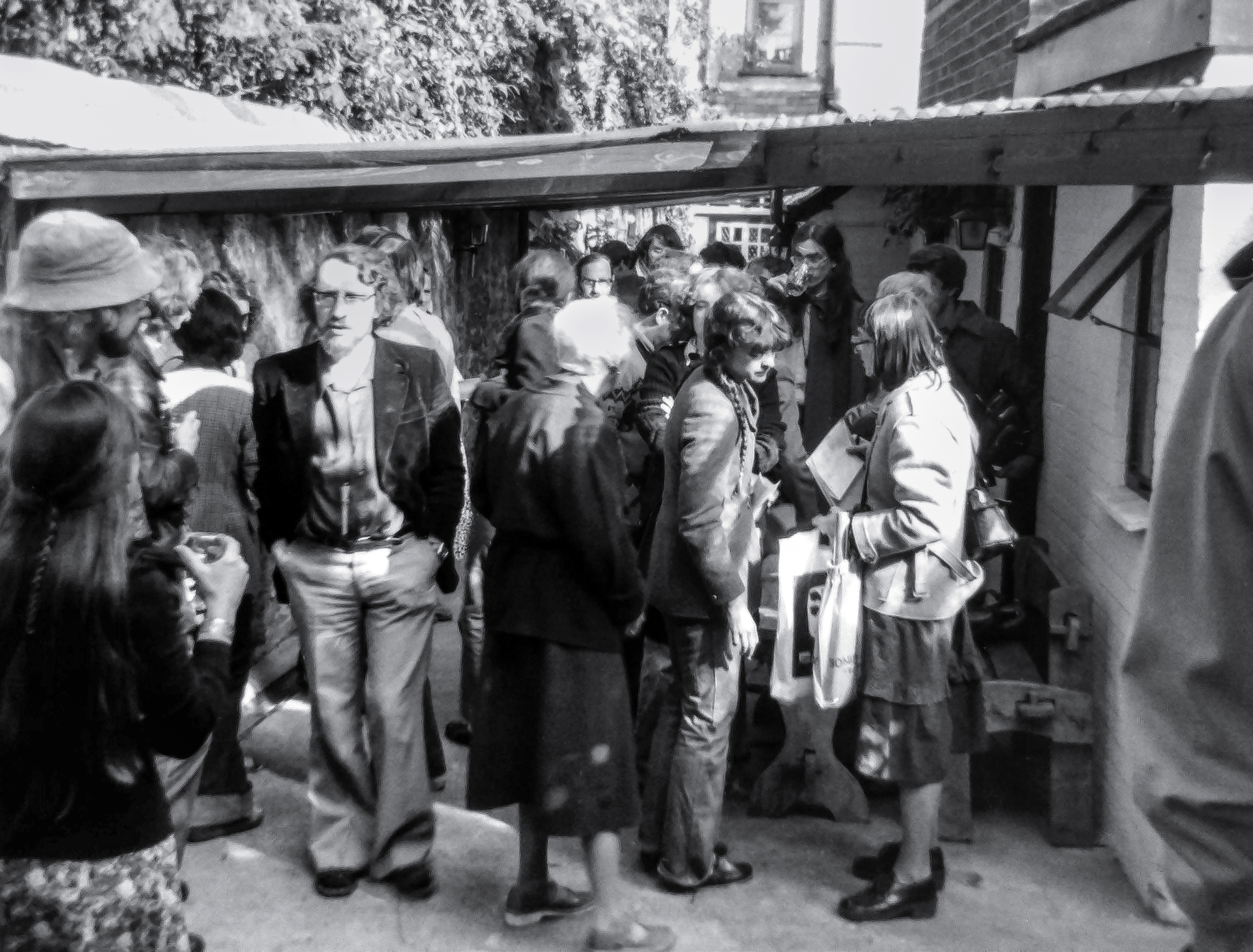
Members of The Tolkien Society at the backyard of Eagle and Child during Oxonmoot 1979

Oxonmoot is a conference and fan convention organised by The Tolkien Society devoted to celebrate and study the life and works of J. R. R. Tolkien. It takes place every year in Oxford, England, formerly around 22 September, the date of Bilbo and Frodo Baggins's birthdays, also known as Hobbit Day, although, since 2014, the event has often been moved to an earlier date at the beginning of September.

== History ==
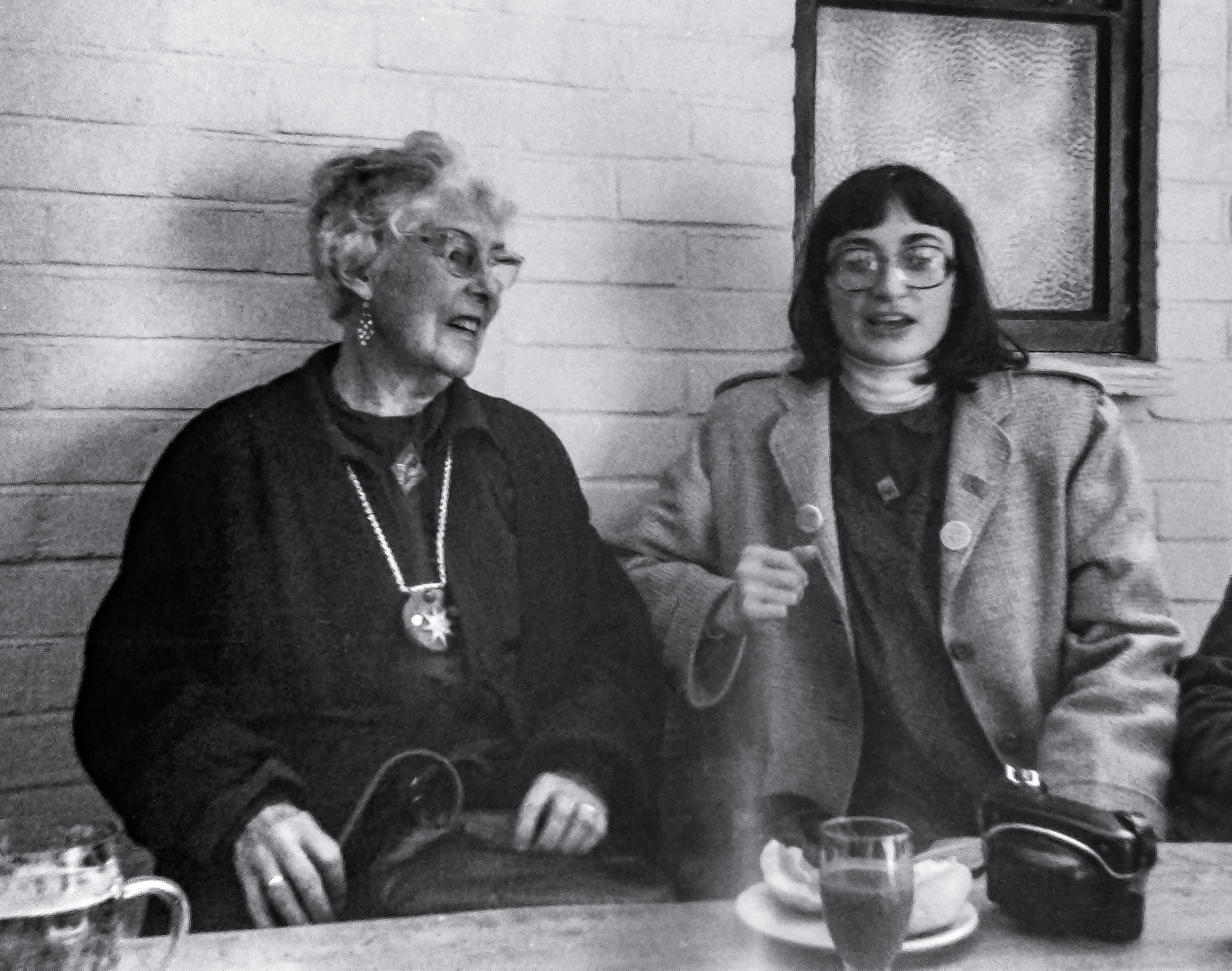
Vera Chapman, founder of the Tolkien Society and Jessica Yates, one of the Oxonmoot founders, at Eagle and Child, Oxonmoot 1979

The idea of a Tolkien-related gathering in Oxford came from the multiple connections of the writer with the city, and was initially suggested by John Abbot in the fanzine Nazgul. The first Oxonmoot took place over 13 to 15 September 1974, and was based in the former Welsh Pony pub in George Street. Among other activities such as visiting the Bodleian Library and lunching in The Eagle and Child pub, attendants of this first meeting laid a wreath on Tolkien's grave, and recited A Elbereth Gilthoniel. During this first Oxonmoot an American student and member of the Mythopoeic Society joined the original group. The 1992 Oxonmoot, at the centenary of Tolkien's birth, was held together with the 23rd Mythopoeic Conference. From 1991 Oxonmoot has been hosted in different colleges of the University of Oxford, for example, Lady Margaret Hall from 2009 to 2014, St Antony's College from 2015 to 2019, and St Anne's College from 2021.

Oxonmoot has become the largest of the Tolkien Society's calendar of events, typically bringing about 200 fans from the UK and abroad. The 2018 Oxonmoot was the largest with more than 300 attendees, coinciding with the popular Bodleian exhibition Tolkien: Maker of Middle-earth.

Due to the COVID pandemic, the 2020 Oxonmoot was held online, and it included keynote talks by Dimitra Fimi about the Unfinished Tales, and Wayne G. Hammond and Christina Scull about Tolkien as an illustrator.

From the following year, 2021, Oxonmoot has been held as a hybrid event, both in person and online.

== Activities ==
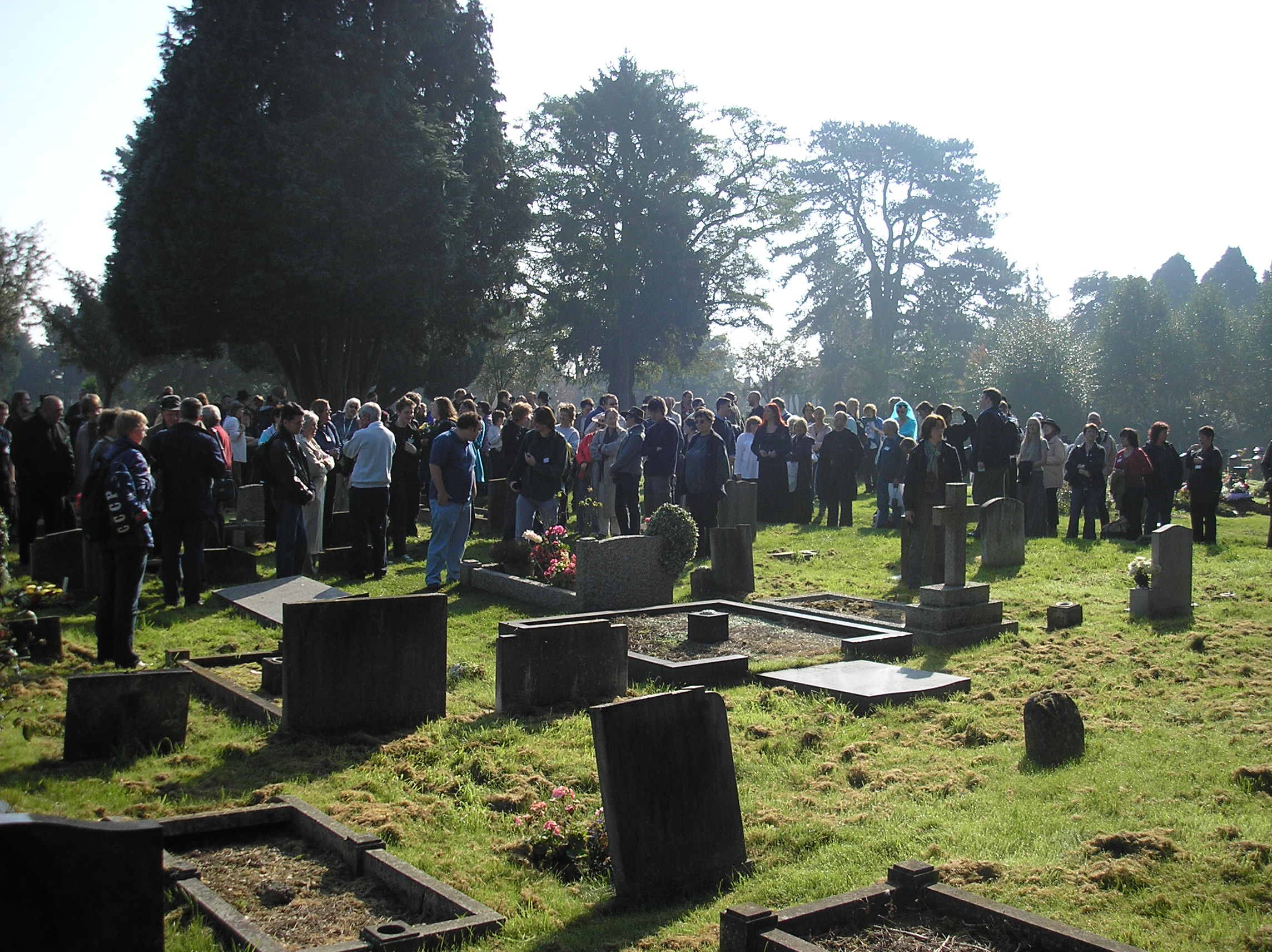
Fan gathering at Tolkien's gravesite during the 2008 Oxonmoot.

Oxonmoot takes place over a weekend and includes talks, art shows, reading circles, theatre performances, workshops, and social events such as quizzes, a banquet and a masquerade.

Oxonmoot is a forum for presenting Tolkien research in the form of seminar papers and books, from academics such as John Garth, Tom Shippey, Verlyn Flieger, Michael D. C. Drout, and Elizabeth Solopova.

=== Enyalië ===
The event closes with a remembrance ceremony called Enyalië at Tolkien's grave in Wolvercote Cemetery. The name “Enyalïe” is from Tolkien's constructed language Sindarin, meaning “remembrance”. The Enyalië continues the tradition established during the first Oxonmoot of laying a wreath on the grave of Tolkien and his wife Edith, and includes words by the Chairman of the Tolkien Society, a selected reading from Tolkien, and a recital of the poem Namárië.

== See also ==
- Tolkien fandom
