= Edward Kloczko =

French linguist

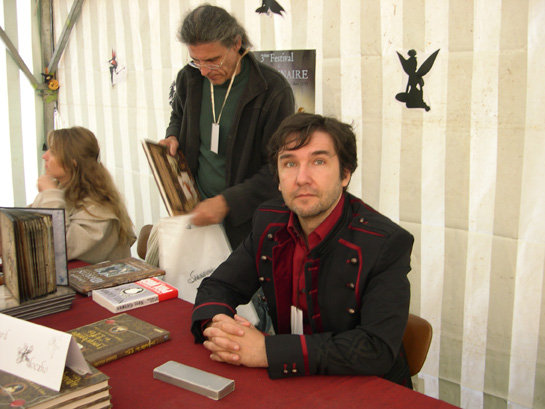
Edward Kloczko at the Aïcontis festival (2011) in France

Edward J. Kloczko (born 22 August 1963, in Lviv) is a Ukrainian linguist, living in France. He has worked with and published on the constructed languages of J. R. R. Tolkien.

In 1985, he founded the Faculté des études elfiques (School of Elvish Studies, whose acronym Fée is French for 'fairy'), which was the first French non-profit literary and educational organization dedicated to the study, discussion, and enjoyment of the works of J.R.R. Tolkien.

He contributes to "The Words of Middle-earth", a linguistic column of Mythprint the monthly bulletin of the Mythopoeic Society.

== Selected bibliography ==
- Le Dictionnaire des langues elfiques: quenya et telerin (Encyclopédie de la Terre du Milieu, volume 1), Tamise, 1995. A trilingual French-English-Quenya dictionary.
- Tolkien en France (as editor), Arda, 1998.
- Dictionnaire des langues des Hobbits, des Nains, des Orques et autres créatures de la Terre du Milieu, de Númenor et d'Aman (Encyclopédie de la Terre du Milieu, volume 4), Arda, 2002.
- L’Encyclopédie des Elfes d'après l'œuvre de Tolkien, Paris : Le Pré aux Clercs, 2008.
- Le Monde magique de Tolkien, Paris : Auzou, 2010.
- "Review: Parma Eldalamberon 18", Mythprint, vol. 48, nº2, February 2011.
- "Review: Parma Eldalamberon 19", Mythprint, vol. 48, nº2, February 2011.
- "Lothlórien: The Long Story of a Short Name", Mythprint vol. 48, nº4, April 2011, pp. 8–9.
- "The Mysterious 'Book of Mazarbul' Reveals More", Mythprint vol. 48, nº6, June 2011, p. 7.
- "An External History of the Elvish Languages — Part One", Mythprint vol. 48, nº9, September 2011, pp. 8–9.
