= The Oxford Book of Science Fiction Stories =

- First edition
- Author: Tom Shippey
- Cover artist: Victor Stabin
- Language: English
- Genre: Sci-Fi
- Publisher: Oxford University Press
- Publication date: 1992
- Publication place: United Kingdom
- Media type: Book
- Pages: 586
- ISBN: 978-0-19-280381-8

The Oxford Book of Science Fiction Stories is a book of science fiction stories edited by Tom Shippey, published in 1992 then reissued in 2003.

== Contents ==
Author	Short Story Title	Year of first publication
H. G. Wells	"The Land Ironclads"	1903
Frank L. Pollack	"Finis	1906
Rudyard Kipling	"As Easy as ABC"	1912
Jack Williamson	"The Metal Man"	1928
Stanley G. Weinbaum	"A Martian Odyssey"	1934
John W. Campbell Jr.	"Night"	1935
Clifford D. Simak	"Desertion"	1944
Lewis Padgett	"The Piper's Son"	1945
A. E. van Vogt	"The Monster"	1948
James H. Schmitz	"The Second Night of Summer"	1950
Arthur C. Clarke	"Second Dawn"	1951
Walter M. Miller Jr.	"Crucifixus Etiam"	1953
Frederik Pohl	"The Tunnel under the World"	1955
Brian Aldiss	"Who Can Replace a Man?"	1958
J. G. Ballard	"Billennium"	1961
Cordwainer Smith	"The Ballad of Lost C'Mell"	1962
Ursula K. Le Guin	"Semley's Necklace"	1964
James Blish	"How Beautiful with Banners"	1966
Harry Harrison	"A Criminal Act"	1967
Thomas M. Disch	"Problems of Creativeness"	1967
Gene Wolfe	"How the Whip Came Back"	1970
Larry Niven	"Cloak of Anarchy"	1972
Norman Spinrad	"A Thing of Beauty"	1973
Raccoona Sheldon	"The Screwfly Solution"	1977
George R. R. Martin	"The Way of Cross and Dragon"	1978
Bruce Sterling	"Swarm"	1982
William Gibson	"Burning Chrome"	1982
Hilbert Schenck	"Silicon Muse"	1984
Paul J. McAuley	"Karl and the Ogre"	1988
David Brin	"Piecework"	1990
