= The Dowry of Angyar =

Science fiction short story by Ursula K. Le Guin

- Short story by Ursula K. Le Guin
- Country: United States
- Language: English
- Genre: Science fiction

Publication
- Published in: Amazing Stories
- Publication type: Magazine
- Publisher: Ziff-Davis Publishing
- Media type: Print (magazine)
- Publication date: September 1964
- Series: Hainish Cycle

"The Dowry of Angyar" is a science fiction short story by American writer Ursula K. Le Guin, first published in 1964. It is the first work of the Hainish Cycle. The story is set on a fictional planet of the star Fomalhaut and follows a highborn woman as she tries to track down a family heirloom. It was framed by commentary from ethnologists studying the intelligent life forms of the Fomalhaut system. The story drew from Norse mythology, including the legend of the Brísingamen, and explored the concept of time dilation. "The Dowry of Angyar" drew comments for its stylistic devices, while a review praised Le Guin's writing as "crystalline prose". It was later used as the prologue to Le Guin's 1966 novel Rocannon's World. In later publications, including in the 1975 anthology The Wind's Twelve Quarters, the story was given the title "Semley's Necklace".

== Setting and framing ==
"The Dowry of Angyar" is the first work set in Le Guin's fictional Hainish universe. In this alternate history, human beings did not evolve on earth but on Hain. The people of Hain colonized many neighboring planetary systems, possibly a million years before the setting of the novels. The planets subsequently lost contact for reasons Le Guin does not explain. Le Guin does not narrate the entire history of the Hainish universe at once, instead letting readers piece it together from various works. The novels and other fictional works set in the Hainish universe recount the efforts to re-establish a galactic civilization. Explorers take years to travel between planetary systems, although the journey is shortened for the travelers due to relativistic time dilation, as well as through instantaneous interstellar communication using the ansible, introduced in The Dispossessed. This galactic civilization is known as the "League of All Worlds".

The story is set on a planet of the star Fomalhaut, which is depicted as harboring multiple intelligent species. The species that the protagonist belongs to has a social structure which divides individuals into two categories: "Olgyior" and "Angyar", with the former subordinate to the latter. There are two additional species, the elf-like Fiia and the dwarf-like Gdemiar. The story depicts the plan soon after "starlords", who are emissaries of the League of Worlds, have begun to land on the planet and levy taxes on its population.

The story is framed by commentary from the League of World's ethnologist Rocannon and the curator of the League's museum on the fictional planet of South Georgia, as they discuss Semley's planet, as well as a description of the intelligent species of the Fomalhaut system, and a comment on Rocannon's own story by an unknown narrator.

== Plot summary ==
Semley, a highborn Angyar woman, is married at a young age. Despite being from a highborn family, she has less material wealth than many of the members of the household of her husband, and feels threatened by this. Not long after a daughter is born to her, she returns to her family seeking a necklace of mythical beauty that her family once possessed. Her father sends her to the Fiia, who profess no knowledge of it. She then turns to the Gdemiar, who manufactured the necklace. They tell her that they can take her to it, in a journey that "will last only one long night." She is taken on board a spaceship to a museum of the League of Worlds, where she meets Rocannon. She asks the museum for her necklace, and they return it to her. Semley returns to her husband's house, where she finds that although she only experienced two days of travel, she has been away for nine years by the planet's calendar; the planet's year lasts 800 days, and so Semley has been away nearly 20 Earth years. Her husband is now dead, and her daughter a grown woman. In her grief, Semley abandons the necklace and runs into the wilderness.

== Themes ==
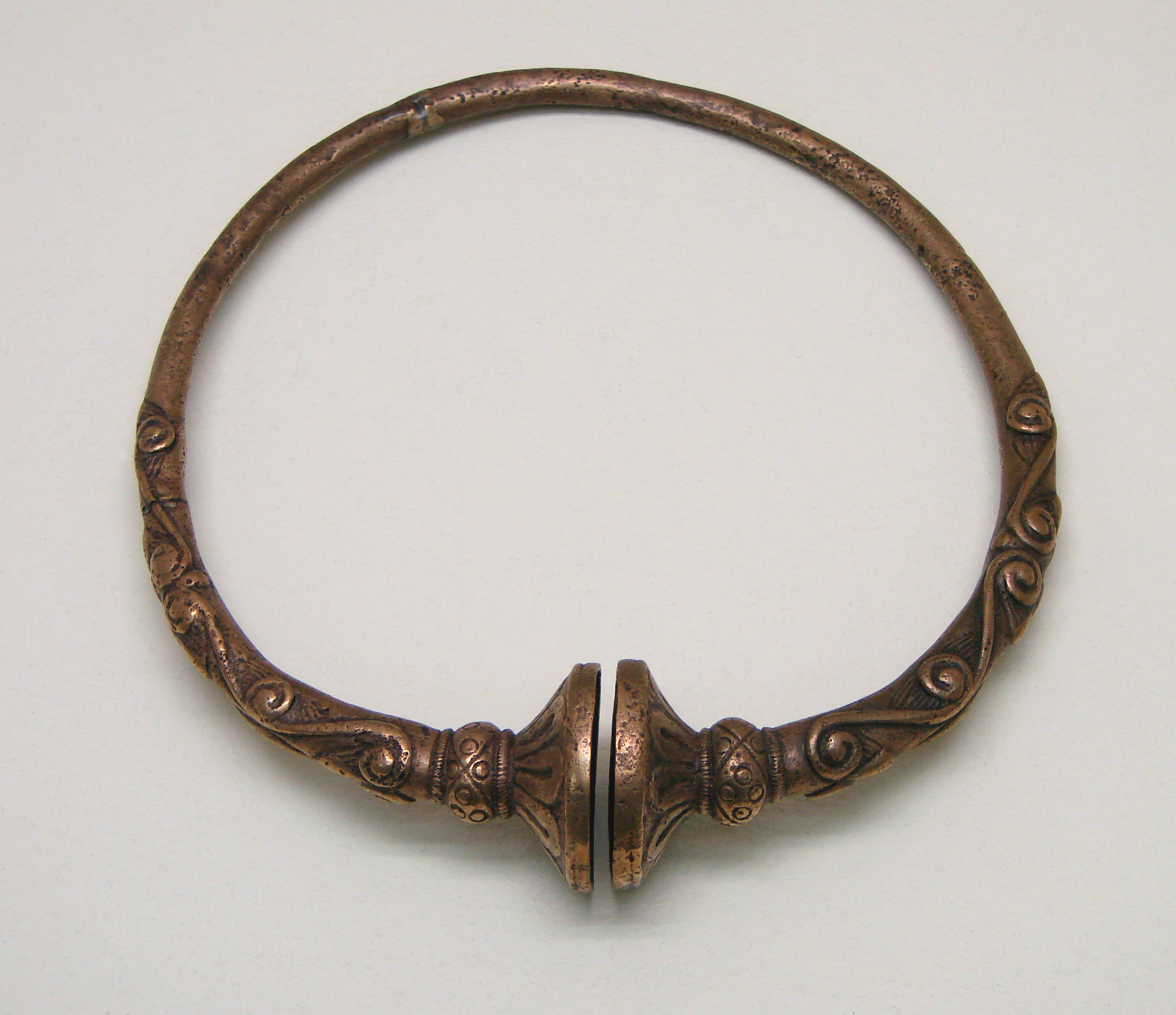
A torc, or necklace, like that featured in the Brísingamen myth

In an introduction to the story written for a later anthology, Le Guin said that "The Dowry of Angyar" was most characteristic of her early science fiction writing. She described it as the most romantic of her works, saying that she had steadily moved away from explicit romanticism. She wrote "the candor and simplicity of ['The Dowry of Angyar'] have gradually become something harder, stronger, more complex."

Multiple scholars describe the story as having been inspired by "Brísingamen", a Norse myth about the necklace of the goddess Freyja. Amy M. Clarke stated that the nocturnal Gdemiar in Le Guin's story were the analogs of the dwarves in the Norse myth, while the diurnal Fiia were similar to the elves. Donna White also wrote that The Dowry of Angyar was a retelling of the myth of Freyja's necklace, and compared the role of Rocannon to that of Odin in the myth. Suzanne Reid notes that while the Freya of legend is greedy for gold, Le Guin portrays Semley as wanting the necklace only to live up to the expectations of noble society. A commentary in Science Fiction Studies stated that the story mixed Norse mythology with the notion of time dilation from Einsteinian relativistic physics.

According to scholar Kim Kirkpatrick, Semley's story is told through Rocannon, making Semley more of a passive object. Additionally, Semley as a character is shown as not being self-aware in the way Rocannon is, and especially unaware of the consequences of her action in travelling on the spaceship. Scholar Richard D. Erlich wrote that the protagonist of the story gets the object of her quest at the end, but at a high price. Therefore, Erlich states that the story teaches a message of caution, a message that is found elsewhere in folklore. Erlich also notes thematic similarities to other Le Guin works, including the conclusion of a journey in its protagonist's return.

The Encyclopedia of Science Fiction described the story as exploring the subjective nature of time in the folkloric concept of Faerie, and providing a "Technofantasy justification" for it. Semley's journey lasts a single night or two, but cruelly she discovers too late that time dilation has resulted in many years having elapsed at home.

== Publication and reception ==
"The Dowry of Angyar" was written in 1963, and published in the science fiction magazine Amazing Stories in 1964. The story was used as the prologue (titled "Prologue: The Necklace") into the 1966 novel Rocannon's World, Le Guin's first novel. It was reprinted as the first story in the 1975 collection The Wind's Twelve Quarters, and anthologized in the 1992 collection The Oxford Book of Science Fiction Stories. In later printings the story was titled "Semley's Necklace".

An obituary for Le Guin in the web publication The Conversation described the story as the "finest of its kind" in the genre of fantasy, and went on to say that its "crystalline prose [was] equal to Semley’s tragic fate". A review of The Wind's Twelve Quarters in a teachers' journal referred to the story as a "valuable reading experience". A review by Dan Miller of the Chicago Daily News described it as an "outstanding fantasy". A 2020 retrospective of The Wind's Twelve Quarters in Tor called "The Dowry of Angyar" the best of the four stories in that collection that grew into later novels, calling the prose lyrical and writing that "Le Guin’s attention to language as a craft, rather than merely a vehicle for story, shines through".

The style and structure of the story were commented upon by several reviewers. Kirkpatrick found that "The Dowry of Angyar" used stylistic devices frequently used later by Le Guin. These included directly addressing the reader in a manner that engaged the audience in creating the story, and involving the central character in an identity-related guessing game. Kirkpatrick stated that although the story is seemingly focused on Semley, in some respects Rocannon is the main character. As a scientist, he studies and questions Semley, thus both depicting and objectifying her as an alien "other" and likening his own perspective to that of the audience, whose curiosity about Semley's story he shares.

A 2015 literary commentary suggested that within the story Le Guin used two styles that alternated. The framing story, set in a museum of the Ekumen, used scientific and technical language, in keeping with the character of Rocannon, a style typical of conventional science fiction. Semley's journey, on the other hand, was told with a "poetic shaping of language" that the author found more typical of fantasy, or "science fantasy". The commentary described this combination as a "very interesting compositional operation". Erlich similarly commented that the story was a "beautiful exercise in irony and the science-fictionalization of folk motifs".

== Sources ==
- Cummins, Elizabeth (1990). Understanding Ursula K. Le Guin. Columbia, South Carolina, USA: University of South Carolina Press. ISBN 9780872496873.
- Reid, Suzanne Elizabeth (1997). Presenting Ursula Le Guin. New York: Twayne. ISBN 9780805746099.
