= King and Emperor =

1996 novel by Harry Harrison

- First edition
- Author: Harry Harrison
- Language: English
- Series: The Hammer and the Cross
- Release number: 3
- Genre: Science fiction
- Set in: 9th century in England
- Publisher: Legend Books (U.K.), Tor Books (U.S.)
- Publication date: July 1996
- Media type: Print (Hardcover)
- Pages: 452
- ISBN: 0-09-930305-1 (U.K.); 0-312-85692-X (U.S.)
- OCLC: 43177734
- Dewey Decimal: 813.54
- LC Class: PS3558.A667 K56 1996
- Preceded by: One King's Way

King and Emperor is the third and final novel in the Hammer and the Cross series. It was written by Harry Harrison and first published in 1996 by Tor Books.

== Plot summary ==
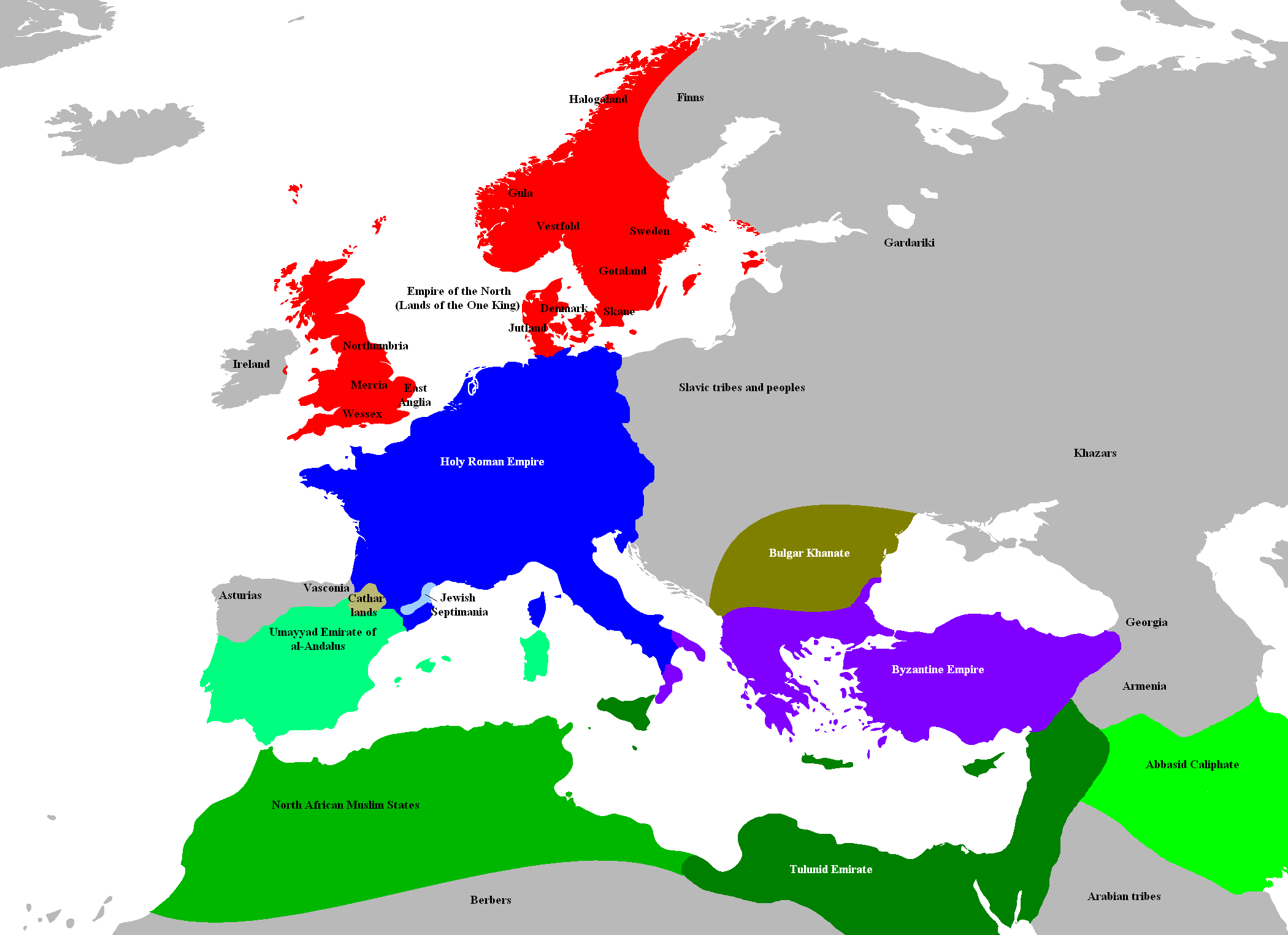
Map of Europe at the beginning of the novel. Shef's Empire of the North is denoted in red.

Shef, now "King of the North", sets out to learn the secrets of manned flight and Greek fire while his enemy, the now emperor Bruno, seeks the Holy Grail.
