= One King's Way =

Book by Harry Harrison and Tom Shippey

- First edition (Legend Books)
- Author: Harry Harrison
- Cover artist: Mick Posen (U.K. ed.)
- Language: English
- Series: The Hammer and the Cross
- Release number: 2
- Genre: Science fiction
- Set in: 9th century in England
- Publisher: Legend Books (U.K.), Tor Books (U.S.)
- Publication date: February 1995
- Media type: Print (Hardcover)
- Pages: 426
- ISBN: 0-09-930306-X (U.K.); 0-312-85691-1 (U.S.)
- OCLC: 33667105
- Dewey Decimal: 813.5/4
- LC Class: PS3558.A667 O54 1995
- Preceded by: The Hammer and the Cross
- Followed by: King and Emperor

One King's Way is the second part of the trilogy by Harry Harrison and John Holm (Tom Shippey) that began with The Hammer and the Cross. The book was published in 1995.

== Plot summary ==
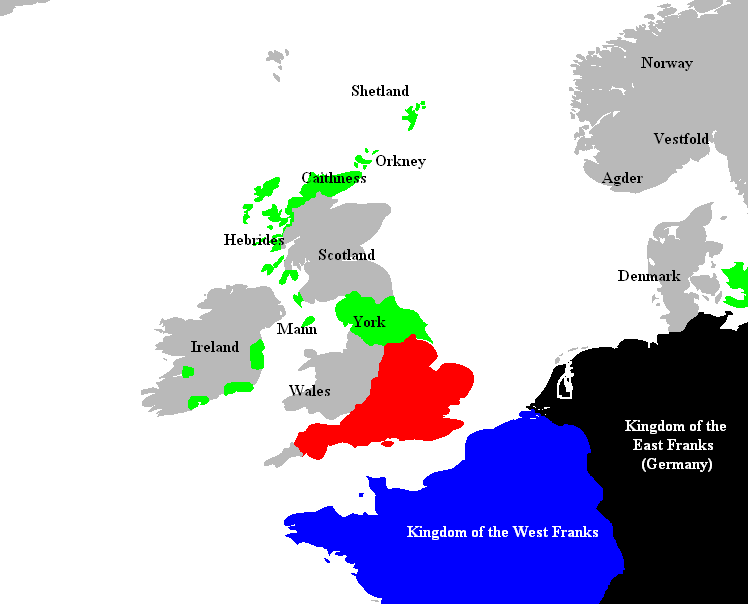
Northwest Europe at the beginning of the novel. Territories held by Shef and Alfred are denoted in red; territories held by the Ragnarssons and their allies in green.

Shef is now co-king of a realm in southern Britain. After getting separated from his comrades in a sea battle with the Ragnarssons, he begins an epic journey through Scandinavia. Also travelling through Scandinavia is Bruno, a Christian knight in search of the Holy Lance, hoping to restore the empire of Charlemagne. The book was followed by the final part of the trilogy, King and Emperor.
