= The Tolkien Society =

Educational charity and literary society

- Established: 6 November 1969; 56 years ago
- Founder: Vera Chapman
- Legal status: Educational charity
- Purpose: Education
- Location: United Kingdom
- Region served: Global
- President: J. R. R. Tolkien (in perpetuo)
- Vice-President: Priscilla Tolkien (in perpetuo)
- CEO: Shaun Gunner
- Affiliations: Alliance of Literary Societies
- Website: tolkiensociety.org

The Tolkien Society is an educational charity and literary society devoted to the study and promotion of the life and works of the author and academic J. R. R. Tolkien.

It began informally in 1969, and held its inaugural meeting in 1970. It holds five annual events, namely a Birthday Toast, a Tolkien Reading Day, an AGM and Springmoot, a Seminar, and the Oxonmoot conference-and-convention.

The society publishes a bulletin named Amon Hen, and a peer-reviewed journal, Mallorn. It has local groups called "smials", one of which, the Cambridge Tolkien Society, publishes the open access journal Anor.

== History ==
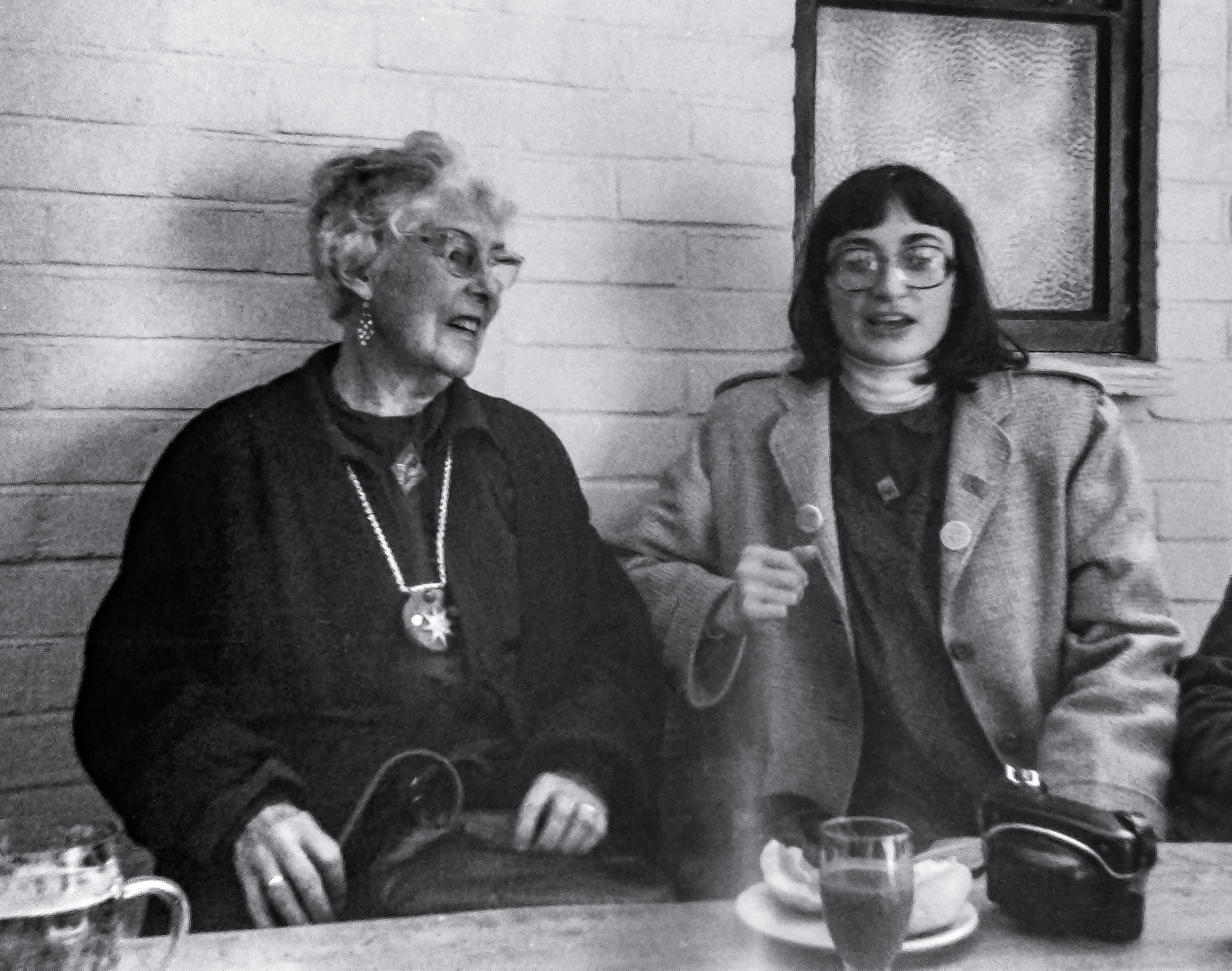
Vera Chapman and Jessica Yates, then secretary of the Tolkien Society and editor of Amon Hen, at the Eagle and Child, Oxonmoot 1979

In the November 1969 issue of The Middle Earthworm, a letters of comment fanzine mainly aimed at British members of the Tolkien Society of America, Vera Chapman announced "if not quite the birth, at least the hopeful conception of a Tolkien Society of Britain". This was supplemented by a personal column by Chapman in the New Statesman published on 7 November which ran "Tolkien Society of Britain — write Belladonna Took [Chapman's pseudonym], c/o Chapman, 21 Harrington House, Stanhope St. London NW1". Since this would have hit news-stands a day before publication, the Tolkien Society's informal beginning has been placed at Thursday 6 November 1969.

The Tolkien Society gradually took shape over the following years. December 1969 saw the publication of Belladonna's Broadsheet, which after three issues was replaced by The Mallorn in October 1970. This was conceived as a quarterly publication, and the first issue was joined by The Tolkien Society Bulletin, which was to be produced on a six-weekly basis. The Society's official bulletin was replaced in January 1972 with Anduril, but was quickly supplanted by Henneth Annûn after three issues (the first had been numbered 0, and it continued independently until issue number 7). This new publication changed its name to Amon Hen with the second issue, seemingly for no particular reason. It, together with Mallorn (the article having been dropped), are still published by the Tolkien Society.

The "inaugural" meeting of the Tolkien Society was hosted by the Hobbit Society of University College London on 29 January 1970, where the name of the new society was discussed and the first committee was appointed. A constitution was considered at the first general meeting of the Tolkien Society on 20 November 1970 at UCL, but was ultimately rejected. The Tolkien Society did not become a legal entity until a constitution was finally ratified on 15 January 1972. It later obtained charitable status in England and Wales on 7 July 1977.

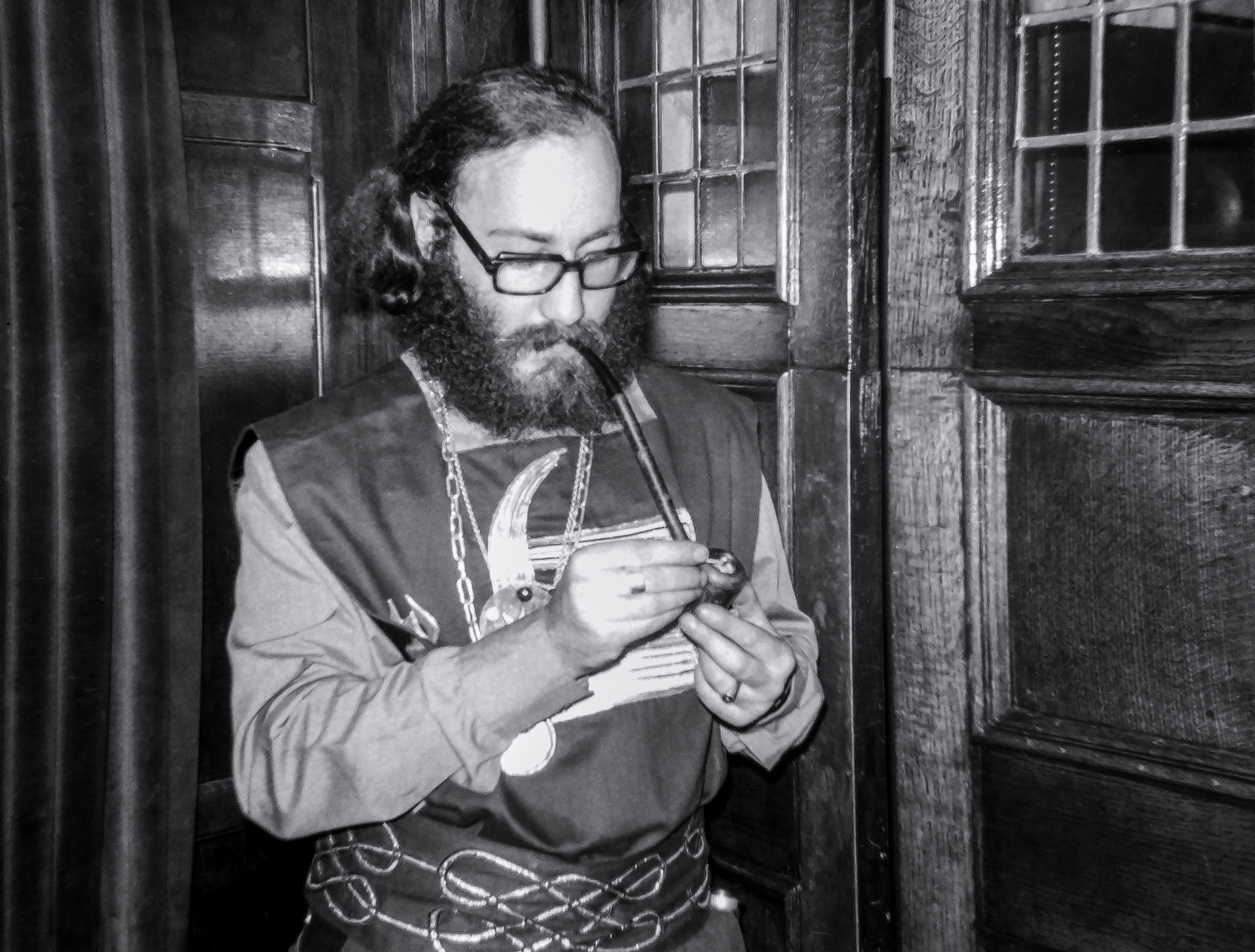
Jonathan Simons, third chairman of the Tolkien Society at Oxonmoot 1979

An AGM has been held each year since 1972, and since 1973 has featured a talk from a guest speaker. It is one of the three main annual Tolkien Society events, the largest and most popular being "Oxonmoot". In the December 1973 issue of the fanzine Nazgul, contributor John Abbot asked, "[w]hat do you think of the idea of Oxford Moot this year?" The 1974 AGM approved the idea, and the first Oxonmoot met at The Welsh Pony on George Street, later that year between 13–15 September. The first (near-)annual Tolkien Society "workshop" was held on 22 March 1986, morphing into the "Tolkien Society Seminar" from 1989 onwards. The more informal "Summermoot" was held on an irregular basis in the 1980s and 1990s, occasionally hosted by Joanna Tolkien and Hugh Baker at their farm in Wales. According to their son (and Tolkien's great-grandson) Royd Tolkien:

As a family, we've always been involved with The Tolkien Society and when I was a kid they used to come up to our small farm in Wales for Summer Moots. They'd dress up as characters, camp in the field, sword fight, let off homemade fireworks and have huge campfires. The first awareness of the legacy came from those fun times.

The Tolkien Society has organized major conferences to celebrate significant Tolkienian anniversaries. "The J. R. R. Tolkien Centenary Conference" at Keble College, Oxford, marked one-hundred years since Tolkien's birth in 1992. "Tolkien 2005: The Ring Goes Ever On" celebrated the fiftieth anniversary of The Lord of the Rings at Aston University, Birmingham. "The Return of the Ring: Celebrating Tolkien in 2012" marked seventy-five years since the publication of The Hobbit at Loughborough University, and received a special video message from director Peter Jackson and artists John Howe and Alan Lee.

== Contact with Tolkien ==
Chapman first contacted J. R. R. Tolkien on behalf of the Tolkien Society at the suggestion of Joy Hill, Tolkien's secretary during the 1960s. On 1 May 1970 she wrote Tolkien a letter introducing the Society and its aims. When it was announced that Tolkien had been awarded a CBE in the New Year's Honours, the Society sent Tolkien a telegram on his eightieth birthday on 3 January 1972, a gift of tobacco in a green china jar, and a congratulatory note; on 6 February, he replied thanking the Society.

Later that year, on 27 June, Chapman met Tolkien at a sherry party hosted by Tolkien's publishers, Allen & Unwin, and Tolkien agreed to become the Society's honorary president. Tolkien died the following year, and Chapman offered the presidency to his son Christopher. He wrote back suggesting that his father could remain president in perpetuity. This was agreed at the following Annual General Meeting in 1974.

== Activities ==
=== Events ===
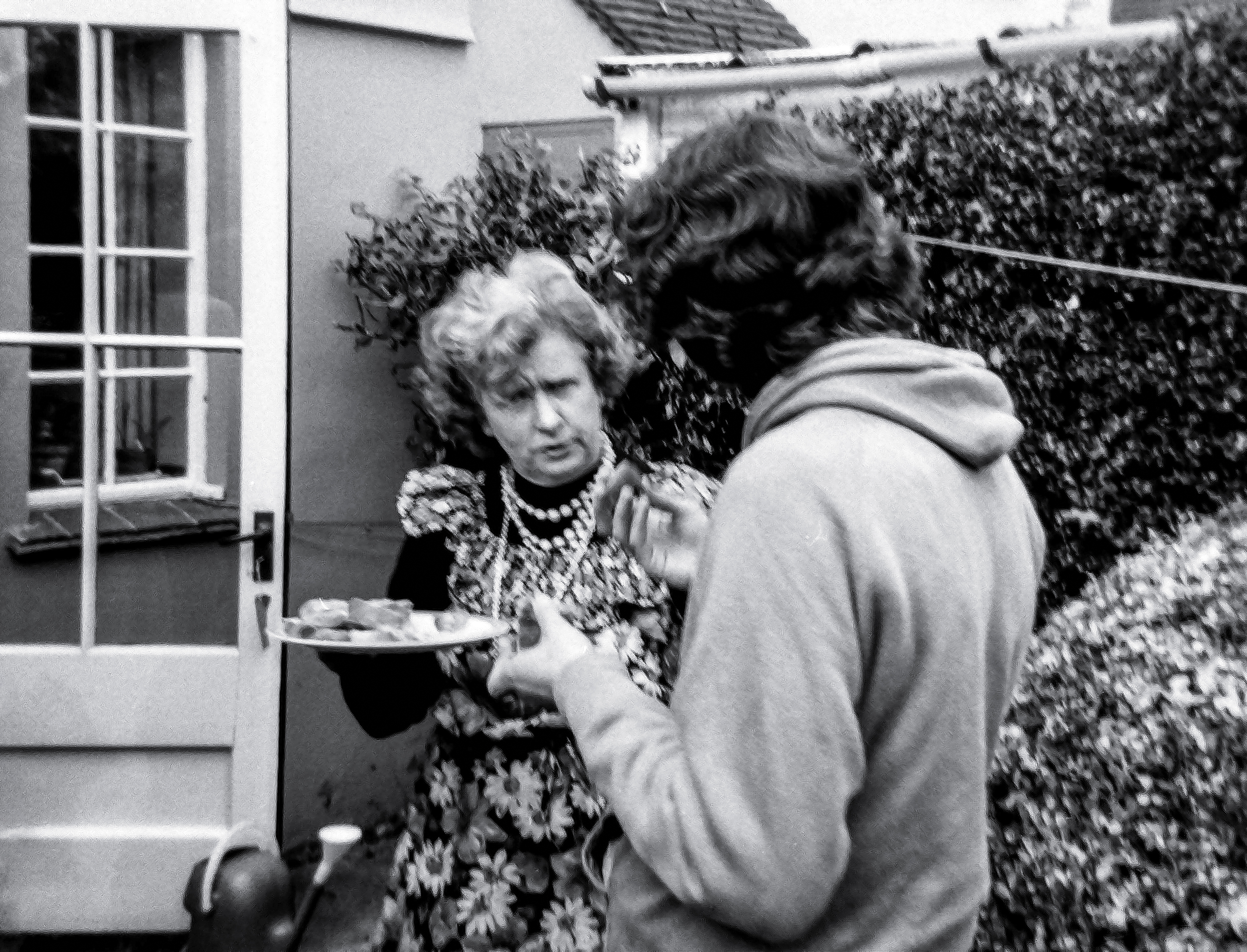
Priscilla Tolkien, honorary vice-president of the Tolkien Society, hosting a garden party for the Society at her house during Oxonmoot 1979

The Tolkien Society currently organizes five events on an annual basis:

- The Birthday Toast is held on Tolkien's birthday on 3 January. The Society asks fans across the world to raise a toast to "The Professor" at 9pm their local time. Many local groups (or "smials") hold their own Birthday Toast events. In recent years the event has become social media orientated, with fans sharing pictures of themselves raising a toast to Tolkien on platforms such as Facebook and Twitter.
- Tolkien Reading Day is held on the anniversary of the downfall of Sauron on 25 March. It aims to promote the reading of Tolkien based around a particular theme chosen each year by the Tolkien Society committee. The idea was first proposed to the Society by Sean Kirst, a journalist at the Syracuse, New York The Post-Standard, in 2002 and the first Tolkien Reading Day was set for 25 March 2003.
- The AGM and Springmoot is held over a weekend in April. Although the Annual General Meeting is the main aspect of the event, the weekend also includes the semi-formal Annual Dinner followed by a talk from a guest speaker. As the AGM and Springmoot changes location each year, it is an opportunity for members to spend the rest of the weekend exploring local attraction sites.
- The Tolkien Society Seminar is a day-long event held over the summer, consisting of a series of papers on a selected theme.
- Oxonmoot is held on a weekend near to Hobbit Day, Bilbo and Frodo's birthday on 22 September. It is a conference-cum-convention held in an Oxford college since 1991. With around 200 attendees, it features academic lectures, quizzes, costuming, and closes with a memorial service called Enyalië at Tolkien's grave in Wolvercote cemetery.

=== Publications ===
The cover of Mallorn 12 (1978), featuring an illustration by Pauline Baynes

Membership of the Tolkien Society includes a subscription to the bulletin Amon Hen and journal Mallorn. The former is published six times a year, while the latter is published once a year. Mallorn tends to be more scholarly than Amon Hen, although the range of content has varied over the years. Prominent contributors include Christopher Tolkien, Priscilla Tolkien, and Tom Shippey.

Quettar was the bulletin of the Linguistic Fellowship of The Tolkien Society between 1980 and 1995, running for forty-nine issues before being wound up.

The Tolkien Society has also published a number of one-off publications, including the proceedings of the 1992 and 2005 conferences. Its "Peter Roe" series of books are published irregularly, and tend to print proceedings of seminars and talks by guest speakers.

=== Local groups ===
Local groups affiliated to the Tolkien Society are known as "smials", the name used for hobbit-holes in The Lord of the Rings. One smial at the University of Cambridge, known as the "Cambridge Tolkien Society" and "Minas Tirith", has published the open access journal Anor since the 1980s.

=== Tolkien to the World ===
The Tolkien to the World programme raises funds to send Tolkien books to schools and libraries across the world. Its aim is "to work towards a situation where everyone in the world has access to Tolkien's principal works of fiction".

=== Archive ===
The Tolkien Society Archive maintains a large number of Tolkien books and journals together with a collection of ephemera such as press clippings and responses (both commercial and creative) to Tolkien which might not otherwise be preserved.

=== Plaques and memorials ===
The Tolkien Society has funded blue plaques at places of significance in Tolkien's life. These include:

- Sarehole Mill in Birmingham, near one of Tolkien's childhood homes and the inspiration behind Ted Sandyman's mill in The Lord of the Rings. In 2015, the Tolkien Society and Birmingham Museums Trust announced a partnership to promote Sarehole Mill and its connection to Tolkien.
- 4 Highfield Road in Birmingham, Tolkien's home between January 1910 and Autumn 1911.
- The Plough and Harrow Hotel in Birmingham, where Tolkien stayed with his new wife Edith on 3 June 1916 shortly before leaving for war service in France.
- 2 Darnley Road in Leeds, the Tolkien family home between 17 March 1924 and 4 January 1926.

The 1992 Centenary Conference, organized by the Tolkien Society and the Mythopoeic Society, sponsored a memorial to Tolkien in Oxford University Parks. This involved the installation of a bench by the River Cherwell with an accompanying plaque and the planting of two trees representing Telperion and Laurelin from The Silmarillion.

=== Awards ===
The Tolkien Society Awards were established in 2014 to "recognise excellence in the fields of Tolkien scholarship and fandom". The awards are held annually and announced at the Annual Dinner during the Society's AGM and Springmoot weekend. Past winners include the authors Christopher Tolkien, Tom Shippey, Dimitra Fimi, John Garth, and artist Jenny Dolfen.

== See also ==
- Category:The Tolkien Society members
- Tolkien fandom
- Mythopoeic Society
