= Tom Shippey =

British medievalist (born 1943)

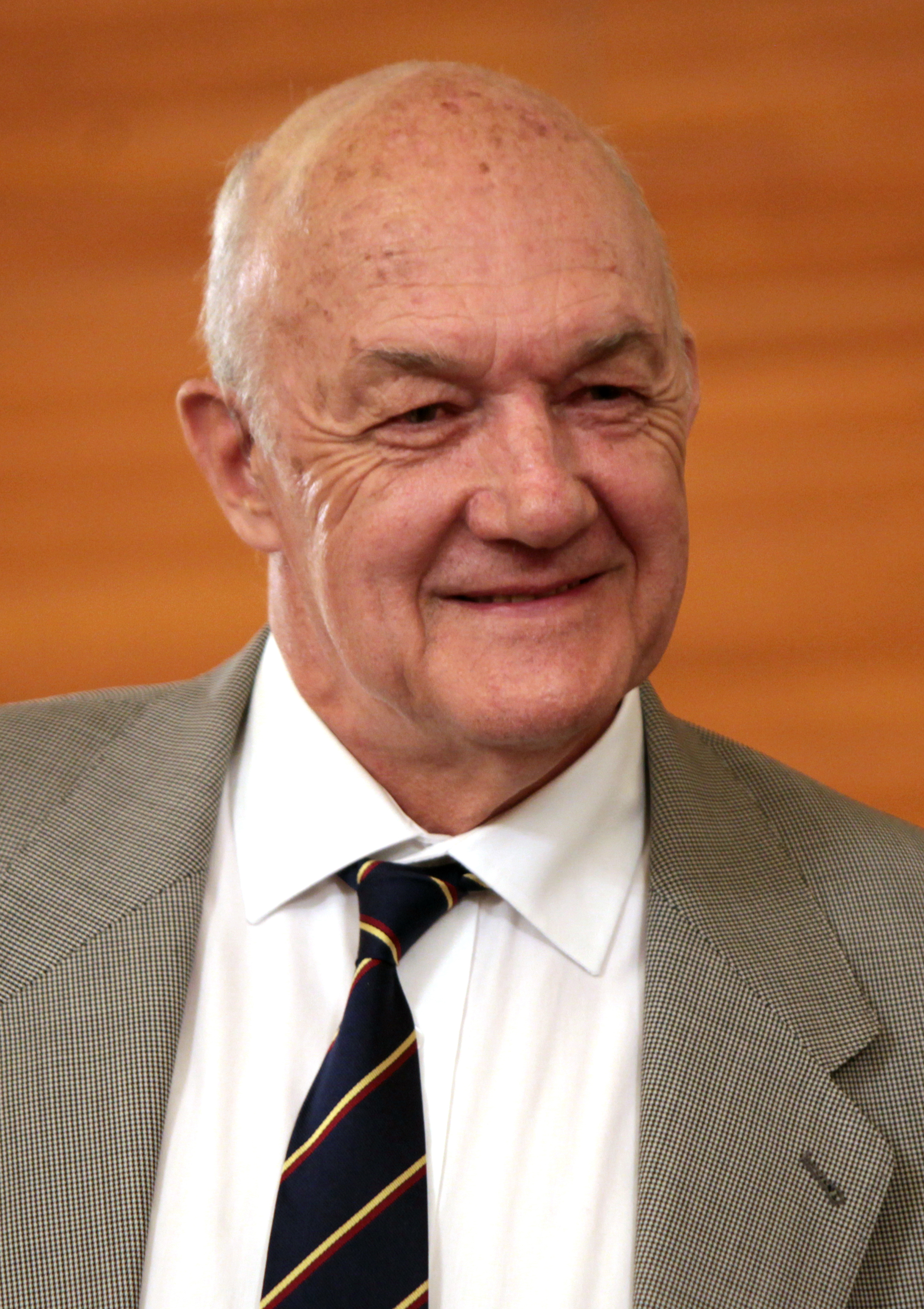
- In 2015
- Born: Thomas Alan Shippey; 9 September 1943 (age 83); Calcutta, British India
- Other name: John Holm (pseudonym)
- Occupations: Academic and writer
- Known for: Tolkien scholarship

Academic background
- Education: King Edward's School, Birmingham; Queens' College, Cambridge (BA, MA, PhD)

Academic work
- Institutions: University of Birmingham; St John's College, Oxford; University of Leeds; Saint Louis University
- Website: https://tomshippey.com/

Thomas Alan Shippey (born 9 September 1943) is a British medievalist, a retired scholar of Middle and Old English literature as well as of modern fantasy and science fiction. He is considered one of the world's leading academic experts on the works of J. R. R. Tolkien, about whom he has written several books and many scholarly papers. His book The Road to Middle-Earth has been called "the single best thing written on Tolkien".

Shippey's education and academic career have in several ways retraced those of Tolkien: he attended King Edward's School, Birmingham, became a professional philologist, occupied Tolkien's professorial chair at the University of Leeds, and taught Old English at the University of Oxford to the syllabus that Tolkien had devised.

He has received three Mythopoeic Awards and a World Fantasy Award. He participated in the creation of Peter Jackson's The Lord of the Rings film trilogy, assisting the dialect coaches. He featured as an expert medievalist in all three of the documentary DVDs that accompany the special extended edition of the trilogy, and later also that of The Hobbit film trilogy.

== Biography ==
=== Early life ===
Thomas Alan Shippey was born in 1943 to the engineer Ernest Shippey and his wife Christina Emily Kjelgaard in Calcutta, British India, where he spent the first years of his life. He studied at King Edward's School in Birmingham from 1954 to 1960.

Like J. R. R. Tolkien, Shippey became fond of Old English, Old Norse, German and Latin, and of playing rugby. He gained a B.A. from Queens' College, Cambridge, in 1964, his M.A. in 1968, and a Ph.D. in 1970.

=== Medievalist ===
Shippey became a junior lecturer at the University of Birmingham, and then a Fellow of St John's College, Oxford, where he taught Old and Middle English. In 1979, he was elected to the Chair of English Language and Medieval English Literature at Leeds University, a post once held by Tolkien. In 1996, after 14 years at Leeds, Shippey was appointed to the Walter J. Ong Chair of Humanities at Saint Louis University's College of Arts and Sciences, where he taught, researched, and wrote books. He has been a visiting professor at Harvard University, the University of Texas, and Signum University.

He has published over 160 books and articles, and has edited or co-edited scholarly collections such as the 1998 Beowulf: The Critical Heritage and in 2005 The Shadow-walkers: Jacob Grimm's Mythology of the Monstrous. Among several influential articles on the Old English poem Beowulf are an analysis of its principles of conversation, a much-cited discussion of the "obdurate puzzle" of the "Modthrytho Episode" (Beowulf 1931b–1962), which seems to describe a cruel irrational queen who then becomes a model wife, and an analysis of "Names in Anglo-Saxon and Beowulf", with special reference to those elsewhere unrecorded. He has also written on Arthurian legend, including its reworkings in medieval and modern literature. His medieval studies have extended as far as to write a book on the lives and deaths of the great Vikings "as warriors, invaders and plunderers", exploring their "heroic mentality", with special reference to the pervasive Norse Bad Sense of Humour.. The Swedish author Lars Lönnroth commented that nothing like Shippey's "eminently readable book" had been attempted since Thomas Bartholin's 1677 history of Danish antiquity, even if Shippey's use of legendary sources meant that the materials used could not be relied upon as history, only as indications of a shared mindset. See further "Vikings: Legend, History, Mindset", online at academia.edu

Since his retirement and his return to England, he has continued his research. His retirement in 2008 was marked by a festschrift, Constructing Nations, Reconstructing Myth, edited by Andrew Wawn, Graham Johnson and John Walter, with contributions from former students and former colleagues. His Tolkien scholar colleagues including Janet Brennan Croft, John D. Rateliff, Verlyn Flieger, David Bratman, Marjorie Burns, and Richard C. West marked his 70th birthday with a further festschrift, Tolkien in the New Century, while another volume of essays by former colleagues and students, Literary Speech Acts of the Medieval North: essays inspired by the works of T.A. Shippey, came out in 2020, edited by Eric Bryan and Alexander Ames.

=== Modern fantasy and science fiction ===
A fan and follower of science fiction from teenage years, in the early 1980s Shippey worked with Brian Aldiss with the concept of world-building in his Helliconia trilogy.

Under the pseudonym of "John Holm", he was the co-author, with Harry Harrison, of The Hammer and the Cross trilogy of alternate history novels, consisting of The Hammer and the Cross (1993), One King's Way (1995), and King and Emperor (1996). For Harrison's 1984 West of Eden, Shippey helped with the constructed language, Yilanè.

Shippey has edited both The Oxford Book of Science Fiction Stories, and The Oxford Book of Fantasy Stories. For ten years he reviewed science fiction for The Wall Street Journal, and still contributes literary reviews to the London Review of Books. In 2009, he wrote a scholarly 21-page introduction to Flights of Eagles, a collection of James Blish's works. He has given many invited lectures on Tolkien and other topics.

=== Tolkien scholarship ===
Shippey's interest in Tolkien began when he was 14 years old and was lent a copy of The Hobbit. Shippey comments on his interest in Tolkien that

Purely by accident, I followed in Tolkien's footsteps in several respects: as a schoolboy (we both went to King Edward's School, Birmingham), as rugby player (we both played for Old Edwardians), as a teacher at Oxford (I taught Old English for seven years at St. John's College, just overlapping with Tolkien's last years of retirement), and as Professor of English Language at Leeds (where I inherited Tolkien's chair and syllabus)."

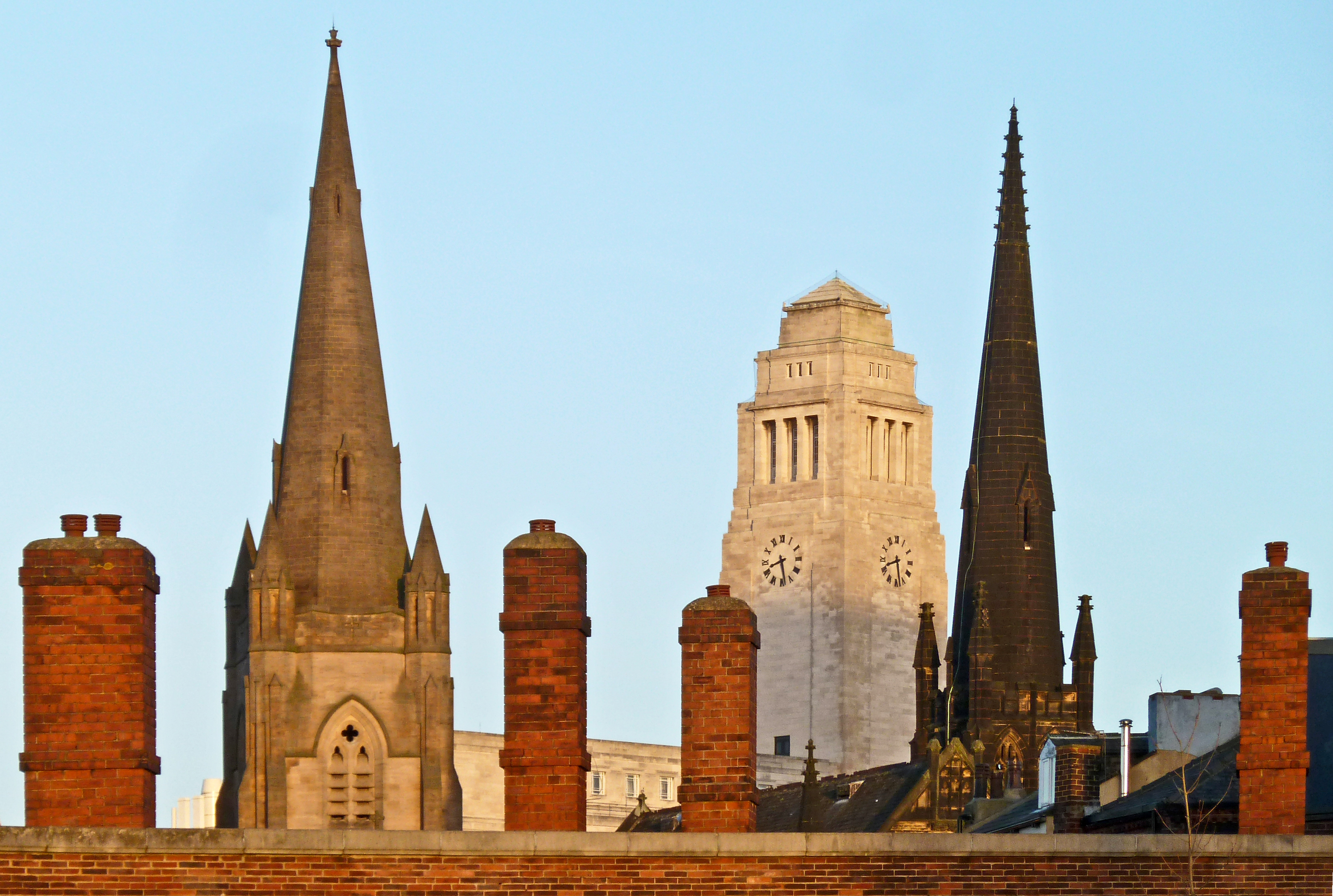
Both Shippey and J. R. R. Tolkien were professors at Leeds University, with offices near Woodhouse Lane (pictured), a placename that Shippey thought Tolkien would have taken as a trace of the woodwoses, the wild men of the woods.

On 11 November 1969, he delivered a lecture on "Tolkien as philologist" at a Tolkien day organised by the Adult Education Department at the University of Birmingham. Joy Hill, Tolkien's private secretary, was in the audience and afterward, she asked him for the script, for Tolkien to read. On 13 April 1970, Shippey received a letter from Tolkien in response; he records that it took him 30 years to decode the "specialised politeness-language of Old Western Man" in which Tolkien replied to Shippey's interpretations of his work, even though, Shippey writes, he speaks the same language himself. Tolkien wrote, hinting that Shippey was "nearly" (italics supplied by Shippey) always correct but that Tolkien had not had the time to tell him about his design as it "may be found in a large finished work, and the actual events or experiences as seen or felt by the waking mind in the course of actual composition [i.e. Tolkien's then-unpublished legendarium]"; Shippey used the phrase "Course of actual composition" as the title of the final chapter of The Road to Middle-earth.

Shippey and Tolkien met later in 1972 when Shippey was invited for dinner by Norman Davis, who had succeeded Tolkien as the Merton Professor of English Language. When he became a Fellow of St. John's College that same year, Shippey taught Old and Middle English using Tolkien's syllabus.

Shippey's first printed essay on Tolkien, "Creation from Philology in The Lord of the Rings", expanded on his 1970 lecture. In 1979, he was elected into a former position of Tolkien's, the Chair of English Language and Medieval English Literature at Leeds University. He noted that his office at Leeds, like Tolkien's, was just off Woodhouse Lane, a name that in his view Tolkien would certainly have interpreted as a trace of the woodwoses, the wild men of the woods "lurking in the hills above the Aire".

His first Tolkien book, The Road to Middle-earth, was published in 1982. In this he attempted to set Tolkien in the tradition of comparative philology, a discipline founded by Jacob Grimm, which he regarded as the major source of Tolkien's inspiration. In 2000, however, he published Tolkien: Author of the Century, in which he attempted also to set Tolkien in the context of his own time: "writing fantasy, but voicing in that fantasy the most pressing and most immediately relevant issues of the whole monstrous twentieth century – questions of industrialised warfare, the origin of evil, the nature of humanity". This would include writers affected by war like Kurt Vonnegut, William Golding, and George Orwell. An enlarged third edition of Road to Middle-earth was published in 2005; in its preface Shippey states that he had assumed (wrongly) that the 1982 book would be his last word on the subject, and in the text he sets out his view, stated at more length in Author of the Century, that "the Lord of the Rings in particular is a war-book, also a post-war book", comparing Tolkien's writing to that of other twentieth-century authors. Road rigorously refutes what was then the long-running literary hostility to Tolkien, and explains to instinctive lovers of Lord of the Rings why they are right to like it. It has been described as "the single best thing written on Tolkien", and "the seminal monograph". The book has received over 900 scholarly citations. Both Road and Author have been often reprinted and translated. In 2000, Michael Drout and H. Wynne looked back at Shippey's books as landmarks in Tolkien research; they comment that "The real brilliance of Road was in method: Shippey would relentlessly gather small philological facts and combine them into unassailable logical propositions; part of the pleasure of reading Road lies in watching all these pieces fall into place and Shippey's larger arguments materialize out of the welter of interesting detail."

As an acknowledged expert on Tolkien, Shippey served for a while on the editorial board of Tolkien Studies: An Annual Scholarly Review. Gergely Nagy, reviewing Shippey's festschrift, wrote that Shippey "has been (and still is) an enabler for all of us in Tolkien Studies: author of the seminal The Road to Middle-earth (first published in 1983) and countless insightful articles, he is the veritable pope of the field."

=== Family life ===
Shippey married Susan Veale in 1966; after that marriage ended, he married Catherine Elizabeth Barton in 1993. He has three children. He retired in 2008, and now lives in Dorset.

== Film and television ==
Shippey has appeared in several television documentaries, in which he spoke about Tolkien and his Middle-earth writings:

- 1984: Tolkien Remembered
- 1996: J.R.R.T.: A Film Portrait of J.R.R. Tolkien
- 1998: An Awfully Big Adventure: J.R.R. Tolkien
- 2002: Page to Screen: The Lord of the Rings
- 2003: J.R.R. Tolkien: Origins of Middle-Earth

He participated in Peter Jackson's The Lord of the Rings film trilogy, for which he assisted the dialect coaches. He was featured on all three of the documentary DVDs that accompany the special extended edition of The Lord of the Rings film trilogy, and later also that of The Hobbit film trilogy. He summarized his experiences with the film project as follows:

"The funny thing about interviews is you never know which bits they're going to pick. It always feels as if they sit you down, shine bright lights in your eyes, and ask you questions until you say something really silly, and that's the bit they choose. At least they didn't waterboard me. But it was good fun, and I'd cheerfully do it again."

== Publications ==
Apart from his published books, Shippey has written a large number of scholarly articles.

Books written

- Old English Verse (London: Hutchinson, 1972, ISBN 978-0-09-111031-4).
- Poems of Wisdom and Learning in Old English (Cambridge: D.S. Brewer, 1976; 2nd ed., 1977 ISBN 0-091-11030-0).
- Beowulf. Arnold's Studies in English Literature series (London: Edward Arnold, 1978, ISBN 978-0-71316-147-2).
- The Road to Middle-earth (London: Allen & Unwin, 1982; Boston: Houghton Mifflin, 1983), 2nd ed. (London: HarperCollins, 1993), Revised and Expanded edition (London: HarperCollins, 2005 ISBN 978-0-26110-275-0).
- J. R. R. Tolkien: Author of the Century (London: HarperCollins, 2001, ISBN 978-0-26110-401-3).
- Roots and Branches: Selected Papers on Tolkien (Zurich and Berne: Walking Tree Publishers, Cormarë Series 11, 2007, ISBN 978-3-905703-05-4).
- Hard Reading: Learning from Science Fiction (Liverpool University Press, 2016, ISBN 978-1-78138-261-5).
- Laughing Shall I Die: Lives and Deaths of the Great Vikings (Reaktion Books, 2018, ISBN 978-1-780239-09-5).
- Beowulf and the North Before the Vikings (Arc Humanities Press, 2022, ISBN 978-1-80270-013-8).

Translations

- Beowulf: Translation and Commentary (Expanded Edition). Ed. Leonard Neidorf. (Uppsala Books, 2024, ISBN 978-1-96136-114-0).

Books edited

- Fictional Space: Essays on Contemporary Science Fiction, (Oxford: Basil Blackwell, 1991, ISBN 0-631-17129-0).
- The Oxford Book of Science Fiction Stories, (Oxford: Oxford University Press, 1992, ISBN 0-19-214204-6).
- Fiction 2000: On Cyberpunk and the Future of Narrative, with George Slusser, (U Georgia Press, 1993).
- The Oxford Book of Fantasy Stories, (Oxford: Oxford University Press, 1994 ISBN 0-19-214216-X).
- Beowulf: The Critical Heritage, with Andreas Haarder (New York: Routledge, 1998 ISBN 978-1-13800-910-3).
- Medievalism in the Modern World: Essays in Honour of Leslie J. Workman, with Richard Utz (Turnhout: Brepols, 1998), ISBN 2-503-50166-4, OCLC 40884815.
- The Shadow-Walkers: Jacob Grimm's Mythology of the Monstrous, (Turnhout: Brepols, 2005 ISBN 978-2-50352-094-0).
- Hard Reading: Learning from Science Fiction. Liverpool University Press, 2016. Available on JSTOR (Open Access).
- Old English Philology: Studies in Honour of R.D. Fulk, with Leonard Neidorf and Rafael J. Pascual (Cambridge: D.S. Brewer, 2016 ISBN 978-1-84384-438-9).

== Awards and distinctions ==
- 1984 – Mythopoeic Award, Mythopoeic Scholarship Award for Inkling Studies, The Road to Middle-earth
- 2001 – Mythopoeic Award, Mythopoeic Scholarship Award for Inkling Studies, J.R.R. Tolkien: Author of the Century
- 2001 – World Fantasy Award, Special Award Professional, J.R.R. Tolkien: Author of the Century
- 2008 – Mythopoeic Award, Mythopoeic Scholarship Award for Myth and Fantasy Studies, The Shadow-Walkers: Jacob Grimm's Mythology of the Monstrous
- 2008 -- Festschrift edited by Andrew Wawn, Graham Johnson and John Walter, Constructing Nations, Reconstructing Myth.
- 2014 – Festschrift edited by John Wm. Houghton, Janet Brennan Croft, Nancy Martsch, John D. Rateliff, and Robin Anne Reid, Tolkien in the New Century: Essays in Honor of Tom Shippey
- 2020 - Festschrift, edited by Eric Shane Bryan and Alaexander Ames, Literary Speech Acts of the Medieval North: Essays inspired by the works of T A Shippey,
