= Glen GoodKnight =

American educator (1941–2010)

Glen GoodKnight with Narnia books and backdrop for a C. S. Lewis event

Glen Howard GoodKnight (October 1, 1941 – November 3, 2010) was the founder of the Mythopoeic Society and the editor of its journal, Mythlore between 1970 and 1998; in that time the publication grew from being a fan magazine to a peer-reviewed academic journal. He was an expert on and collector of the works of J. R. R. Tolkien and his fellow Inklings, C. S. Lewis and Charles Williams.

== Biography ==
Glen Howard GoodKnight III was born in Los Angeles on October 1, 1941 to Glen GoodKnight, an odd-job man, and his wife Mary Bray. The family surname had been anglicized from Gutknecht, a German name. He read history at California State University, Los Angeles. There, in 1967, he organized his first Tolkien event, a playful picnic in the city's Highland Park, with the theme of the Hobbits, Bilbo and Frodo Baggins. The success of that event led him to found the Mythopoeic Society for the study of the work of Tolkien and other fantasy authors. He organised its conferences; the first Mythcon was held in 1970, and one has been held annually thereafter. He edited its journal, Mythlore between 1970 and 1998; in that time the publication grew from being a fan magazine to a peer-reviewed academic journal. Alongside that was a monthly newsletter, Mythprint.

His "day job" was as an elementary school teacher, but he was an expert on and enthusiastic collector of the works of J. R. R. Tolkien and his fellow Inklings, the Oxford literary group around C. S. Lewis and like-minded writers such as Charles Williams. He travelled to England in 1975 and met Priscilla Tolkien, the author's daughter; from her, he bought a substantial collection of first editions of translations of Tolkien's books. He built up his collection to some 700 volumes of Inklings works. He was a distinctive character at Mythopoeic Society events; Valerie Nelson of The Los Angeles Times reports that he "would sometimes show up dressed in the flowing robes of Elrond", the Elf-lord of Rivendell described in Tolkien's The Lord of the Rings.

He had a daughter, Arwen (named for Elrond's daughter), by his second wife, Bonnie, whom he married at the 1971 Mythcon. He died on 3 November 2010 in Monterey Park, California, survived by his partner Ken Lauw. His family donated his collection of rare books on the Inklings to Azusa Pacific University.
