= The Hammer and the Cross =

1993 novel by Harry Harrison and John Holm

- First edition (UK)
- Authors: Harry Harrison and John Holm
- Cover artist: Gino D'Achille
- Language: English
- Series: The Hammer and the Cross
- Release number: 1
- Genre: Science fiction
- Set in: 9th century in England
- Publisher: Legend Books (U.K.), Tor Books (U.S.)
- Publication date: June 1993
- Media type: Print (Hardcover)
- Pages: 430
- ISBN: 0-09-926241-X (U.K.); 0-312-85439-0 (U.S.)
- OCLC: 30030560
- Dewey Decimal: 813.54
- LC Class: PS3558.A667 H35 1993
- Followed by: One King's Way

The Hammer and the Cross is a science fiction novel by Harry Harrison and John Holm, a pseudonym for the Tolkien scholar Tom Shippey. The first in a trilogy, the book chronicles the rise of Shef, a bastard son of a Viking and an English lady. The book is alternative history set in 9th century England, where Viking raids are common.

In this tale, the authors explore what might have happened if the Vikings had fought more successfully against the rule of Chalcedonian Christianity. Central to this story is the protagonist Shef. In the story, Shef's birth is discussed. Such as if Shef is the son of the Norse god Ríg, or of a Viking named Sigvarth. More widely, the story questions whether Shef's visions are messages from the gods or dreams. These questions are developed through the trilogy.

== Plot summary ==
The story begins with Shef as little more than a thrall in his stepfather's service. When he is not busy with mundane tasks, Shef finds himself aiding the village blacksmith, where he develops his talents as well as an affinity for invention. A Viking army invades, and Shef's stepsister Godive is taken during a raid on their village. Shef and his friend Hund proceed to the encampment of the Ragnarssons, leaders of the invading army. Rising swiftly in and beyond the Viking army, Shef's greatest task becomes defeating a new invasion.

== Reception ==
In a review, the Science Fiction Chronicle called the book a "swift-paced, historical science fiction story with an air of absolute authenticity. This is the way it might have, and perhaps should have been."

A review in Runepebble called it "an interesting alternate history" and recommended it for older children as it was "violent but not without cause." Kirkus Reviews called it an "intriguing alternate-world yarn". The reviewer described the book as "Fascinating[ly] sinewy, brutal, and fine—and never mind the sometimes wobbly plot and rather thin characters: few historicals are as powerfully evocative of time and place as Harrison's tremendous saga."

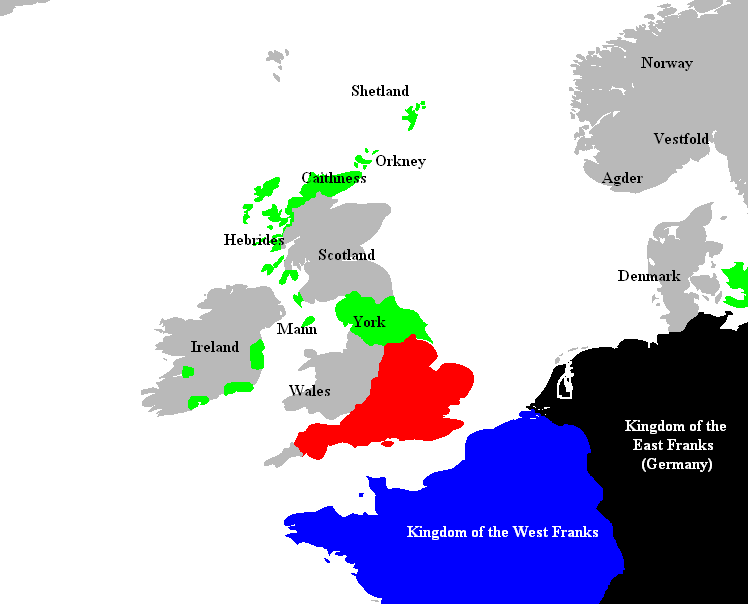
Northwest Europe at the end of the novel. Territories held by Shef and Alfred are denoted in red; territories held by the Ragnarssons and their allies are in green.
