= The Mythic Circle =

American magazine

The Mythic Circle is an illustrated fiction magazine published annually by the Mythopoeic Society containing short fiction and poetry.

== History and profile ==
Founded in 1987 by Sherwood Smith and Lynn Maudlin, The Mythic Circle started as a quarterly zine designed to function as a writers' workshop in print and featured a very active letters column. After several years the enthusiastic submissions of aspiring writers and the challenge of publishing on a quarterly schedule took their toll and the zine changed to thrice-annually, then twice-annually, and finally became an annual publication. After Sherwood Smith and Lynn Maudlin retired as co-editors, Tina Cooper served as editor for several years with Lynn Maudlin continuing as production editor.

Following Tina Cooper's tenure, Gwenyth Hood served as editor for twenty-two years, stepping down in 2020. The current editors of The Mythic Circle are Victoria Gaydosik, fiction and visual art, and Nolan Meditz, poetry and visual art.

== Access and availability ==
Most issues of the magazine are still available for purchase from The Mythopoeic Society at the Mythic Circle website or can be accessed through the official archive, hosted by Southwestern Oklahoma State University Libraries. Free access to the archive is available after a one-year embargo.
