= Hobbit Day =

Unofficial observance, September 22

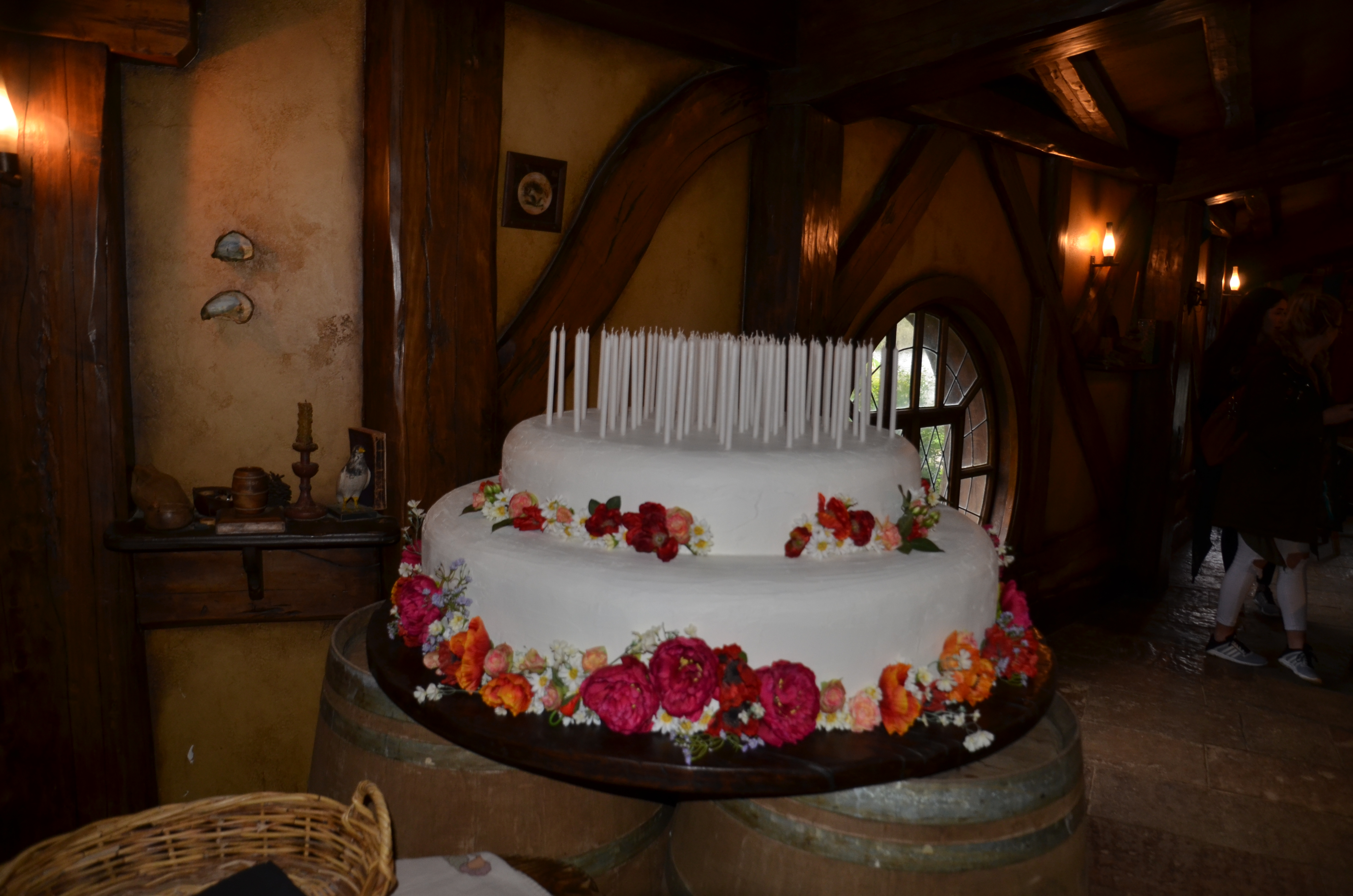
Celebration cake for Hobbit Day at the Green Dragon Tavern on the Hobbiton Movie Set, in 2016

Hobbit Day is a name used for September 22nd in reference to its being the birthday of the hobbits Bilbo and Frodo Baggins, two fictional characters in J. R. R. Tolkien's popular set of books The Hobbit (first published on September 21, 1937) and The Lord of the Rings. According to the fictional setting, Bilbo was born in the year of 2890 and Frodo in the year of 2968 in the Third Age (1290 and 1368 respectively in Shire-Reckoning.)

Tolkien Week is the week containing Hobbit Day.

== Observance ==
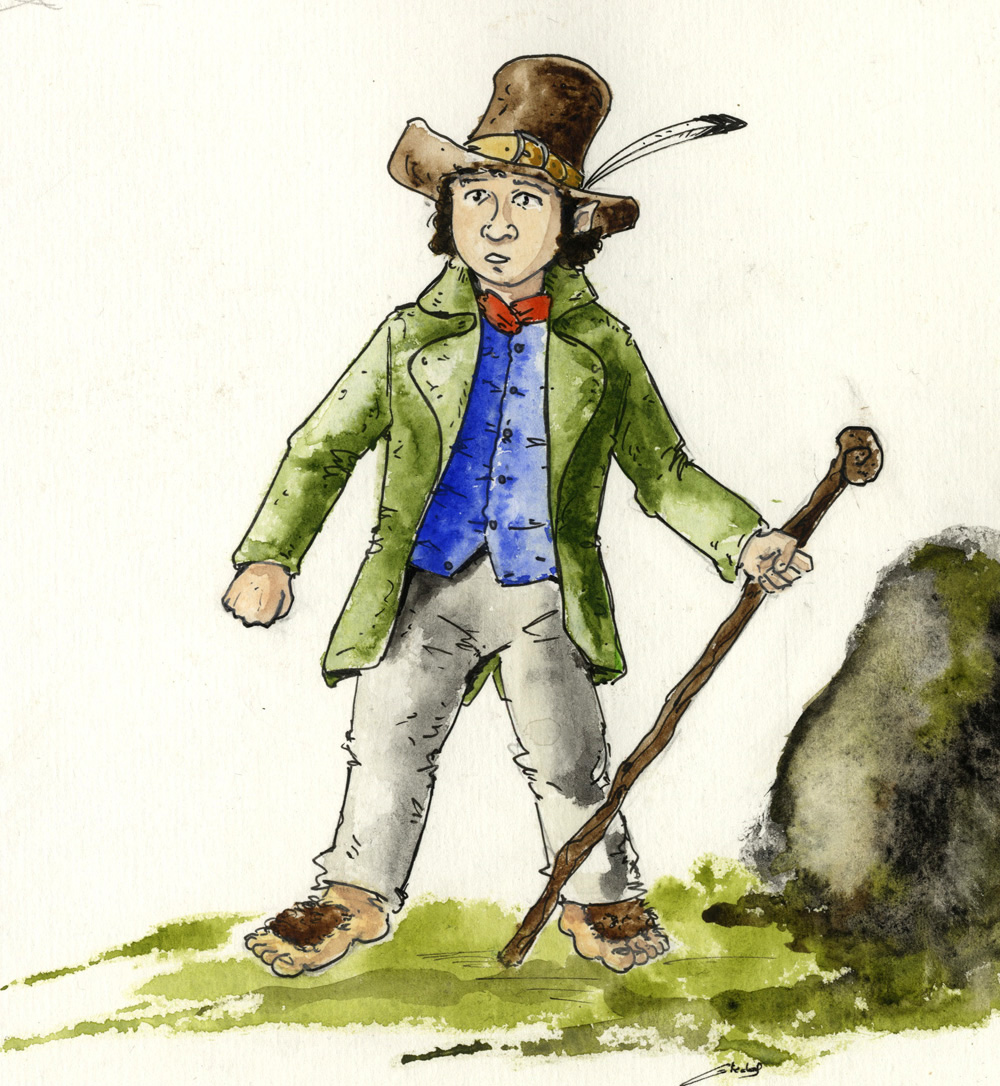
Illustration of a hobbit

The American Tolkien Society first proclaimed Hobbit Day and Tolkien Week in 1978. It defines Hobbit Day as September 22 and Tolkien Week as the calendar week containing that day. The society acknowledges that Hobbit Day pre-dates their designation.

Due to the discrepancies between the fictional Shire calendar and the Gregorian calendar there is some debate about when to celebrate Hobbit Day, since the actual birthday would be between September 12 and 14 in the Gregorian calendar, as explained in the appendices of The Lord of the Rings.

== Celebration ==
The Fellowship of the Ring opened with a celebration of Bilbo's birthday. It was a large party with food, fireworks, dancing, and much merriment.

Some Tolkien fans celebrate by emulating the hobbits' parties. Others simply go barefoot in honour of the hobbits, who do not wear shoes.

Some schools and libraries use this as an opportunity to pique interest in Tolkien's work by putting up displays and hosting events.

According to The Lord of the Rings appendices, "There is no record of the Shire-folk commemorating either March 25 or September 22; but in the Westfarthing, especially in the country round Hobbiton Hill, there grew a custom of making holiday and dancing in the Party Field, when weather permitted, on April 6." In Gondor, however, "in honour of Frodo Yavannie 30, which corresponded to the former September 22, his birthday, was made a festival, and the leap-year was provided for by doubling this feast, called Cormare or Ringday."

== See also ==
- Tolkien fandom
