= Tolkien fandom =

Fans of J. R. R. Tolkien

Tolkien fandom is an international, informal community of fans of the works of J. R. R. Tolkien, especially of the Middle-earth legendarium which includes The Hobbit, The Lord of the Rings, and The Silmarillion. The concept of Tolkien fandom as a specific type of fan subculture sprang up in the United States in the 1960s, in the context of the hippie movement, to the dismay of the author (Tolkien died in 1973), who talked of "my deplorable cultus".

A Tolkienist is a fan who studies the work of J. R. R. Tolkien: this usually involves the study of the Elvish languages and "Tolkienology". A Ringer is a fan of The Lord of the Rings in general, and of Peter Jackson's live-action film trilogy in particular. Other terms for Tolkien fans include Tolkienite or Tolkiendil.

Many fans share their Tolkien fan fiction with other fans. Tolkien societies support fans in many countries around the world.

== History ==
Tolkien's The Hobbit, a children's book, was first published in 1937, and it proved popular. But The Lord of the Rings, first published in three volumes in 1954 and 1955, gave rise to fandom as a cultural phenomenon from the 1960s onwards.

=== 1950s ===
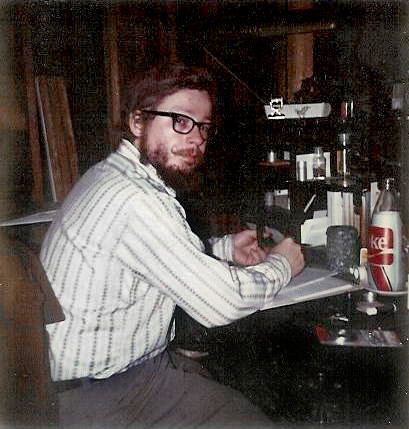
Ted Johnstone (real name David McDaniel, seen here in 1974) founded the first Tolkien fan club.

Tolkien fandom began within science fiction fandom soon after The Fellowship of the Ring was published in 1954. Tolkien was discussed in science fiction fanzines and amateur press association magazines ("apazines"), both as single essays like "No Monroe In Lothlorien!" in Eric Bentcliffe's Triode, and in extended threads of comment such as by Robert Lichtman in his Psi Phi. Tolkien-inspired costumes were worn at Worldcons from 1958. An organized Tolkien fandom organization called "The Fellowship of the Ring" came together in Pittcon, the 18th World Science Fiction Convention in Pittsburgh on 4 September 1960.

England's first Tolkien fanzine was Nazgul's Bane, produced by Cheslin. Many fanzines had little Tolkien content but Tolkien-inspired names such as Ancalagon, Glamdring, Lefnui, Mathom, Perian, Ringwraith, Shadowfax, and so on. Others had more meaningful Tolkien content. Ed Meskys' apazine Niekas turned into a full-fledged fanzine during this era. Pete Mansfield's Sword & Sorcery fanzine, Eldritch Dream Quest, included many Tolkien items.

=== 1960s ===
Foster attributes the surge of Tolkien fandom in the United States of the mid-1960s to a combination of the hippie subculture and anti-war movement pursuing "mellow freedom like that of the Shire" and "America's cultural Anglophilia" of the time, fuelled by a bootleg paperback version of The Lord of the Rings published by Ace Books followed up by an authorised edition by Ballantine Books. The hippie following latched onto the book, giving its own spin to the work's interpretation, such as the Dark Lord Sauron's representing the United States military draft during the Vietnam War. Tolkien described this as a "deplorable cultus" and stated that "Many young Americans are involved in the stories in a way that I'm not", but nevertheless admitted that "... even the nose of a very modest idol [...] cannot remain entirely untickled by the sweet smell of incense!" Fan attention became so intense that Tolkien had to take his phone number out of the public directory.

The embracing of the work by American 1960s counter-culture made it an easy target for mockery, as in Harvard Lampoon's 1969 parody Bored of the Rings, where Tom Bombadil becomes "Tim Benzedrine", and Bilbo Baggins becomes "Dildo Bugger". The Lord of the Rings acquired immense popularity in the emerging hacker culture from the mid-1960s, and the technological subcultures of scientists, engineers, and computer programmers. It figured as one of the major inspirations of the nascent video game industry and the evolution of fantasy role-playing games.

=== 1970s to 1980s ===
Isaac Asimov, who had read The Lord of the Rings three times by Tolkien's death in September 1973, wrote a Black Widowers short story as tribute to the fellow author. "Nothing Like Murder" (1974) mentions college students forming Tolkien societies at Columbia and elsewhere.

Interest in The Lord of the Rings led to several attempts to adapt it for the film medium, most of which were largely unsuccessful. Filmmaker Ralph Bakshi succeeded in securing the rights to produce an animated feature film version, part one of what was originally planned as a two-part adaptation of the story. Bakshi produced the film using, among other animation techniques, rotoscoping, shooting a majority of the film in live-action first before transferring the live footage to animation. While the film has had a mixed critical reaction, it was a financial success, costing USD 8 million to produce, and grossing over USD 30 million at the box office. Despite this fact, United Artists, the film's original distributor, refused to fund a sequel, leaving the project incomplete.

=== 1990s ===
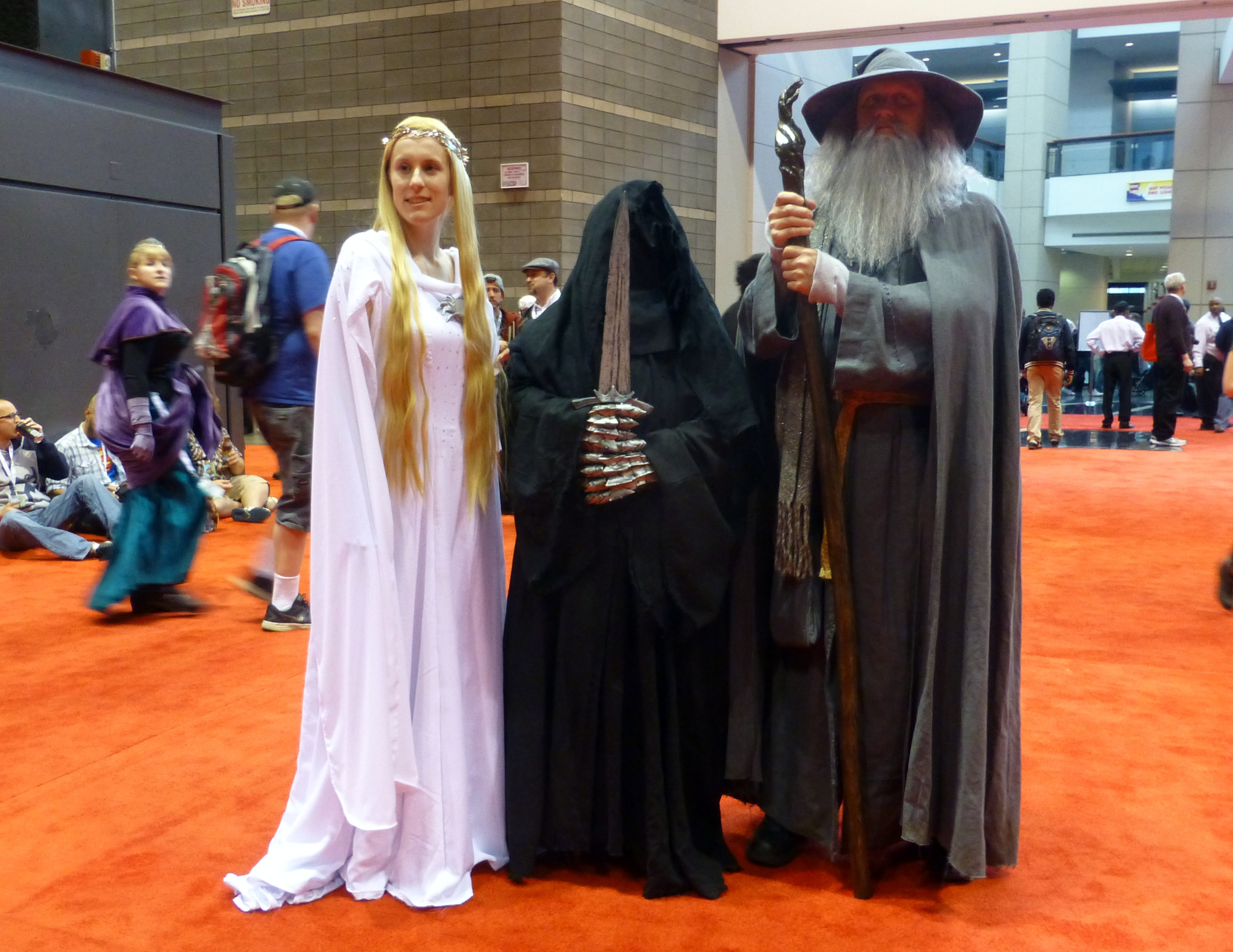
A cosplay of Lord of the Rings characters

The 1990s saw the conclusion of The History of Middle-earth series. A series of minor texts by Tolkien were edited in journals such as Parma Eldalamberon and Vinyar Tengwar, published by the Elvish Linguistic Fellowship since the early 1990s. In the 2000s, several encyclopedic projects have documented Tolkien's life and work in great detail, such as the J.R.R. Tolkien Encyclopedia (2006) and the twin volumes The Lord of the Rings: A Reader's Companion and The J. R. R. Tolkien Companion and Guide (2005, 2006). The dedicated journal Tolkien Studies has been appearing from 2004.

Tolkien discussion took place in many newsgroups from the earliest days of Usenet. The Tolklang mailing list was started in 1990. The alt.fan.tolkien and rec.arts.books.tolkien newsgroups have been active since 1992 and 1993, respectively. Notable points of contention in online discussions surround the origin of orcs, whether elves have pointy ears, whether balrogs have wings, and the nature of Tom Bombadil. Following the announcement of Jackson's movies (from 2001), online fandom became divided between "Revisionists" and "Purists" over controversy surrounding changes to the novel made for the movies, such as those made to the character of Arwen and the absence of Tom Bombadil.

=== 2000s ===
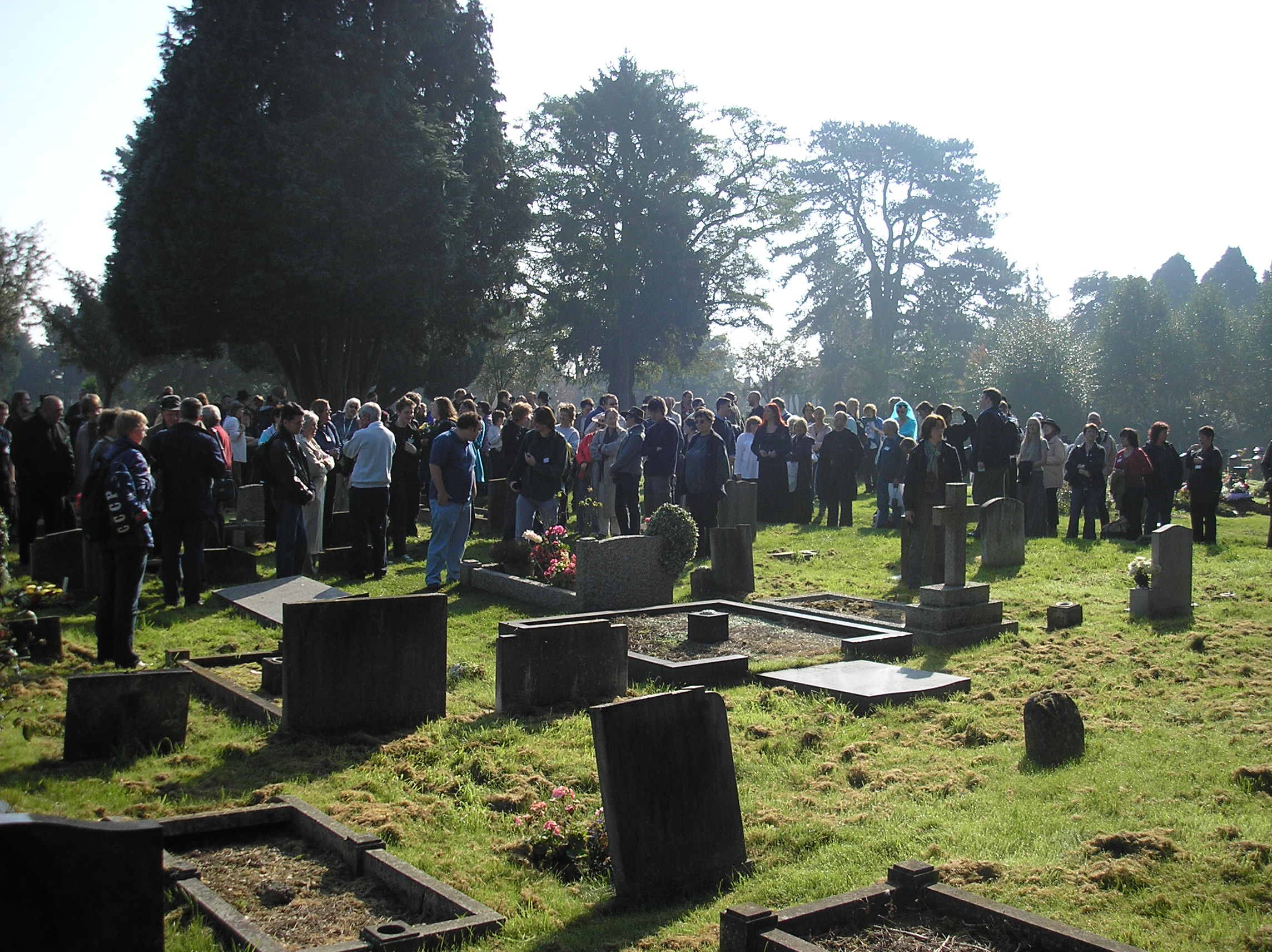
Enyalië meetings of Tolkien fans at his grave, here in 2008, have been described as an experience with religious form.

Tolkien fandom changed in character with the release of Peter Jackson's The Lord of the Rings film trilogy between 2001 and 2003, attracting both a wide audience of existing fans ("book-firsters") and many people who had not read Tolkien's books ("film-firsters"). (Note: For example, as Kristin Thompson says, the terms are in use at "SCOD – Mûmakil and Rohirrim on Pelennor". The One Ring Forums.) The large audience made the artistic conception of Jackson's artists influential, indeed creating a stereotyped image of Middle-earth and its races of Elves, Dwarves, Orcs and Hobbits shared by fans and artists alike. Some fans, known as Tolkien tourists, travel to places in New Zealand to visit sites where scenes in the films were shot.

A "Tolkien Reading Day", held annually on 25 March, an anniversary of the fall of Barad-dûr, was proposed by Sean Kirst, a columnist at The Post-Standard in Syracuse, New York, and launched by the Tolkien Society in 2003.

In 2025, the Tolkien scholar Tom Emanuel proposed a framework which treats Tolkien fandom as "the activities of a secondary faith community", something that in defined ways resembles a religion. He then describes Enyalië, the visiting of Tolkien's grave, as "a powerful collective experience that takes religious form without carrying overt religious content."

== "Essential" websites ==
Four websites are described as "essential" in Stuart D. Lee's 2014 scholarly handbook A Companion to J. R. R. Tolkien: the Tolkien Gateway, The One Ring.Net, The Tolkien Library (which is mainly a book site), (Note: The Tolkien library mainly describes books, but also runs articles, reviews, and news.) and The Tolkien Society (which is an educational charity and literary society).

=== Tolkien Gateway ===
The Tolkien Gateway is a factual site that documents all Middle-earth characters, places, objects, and events, with citations to Tolkien's texts. It provides some coverage of related non-Tolkien items such as films, actors, games, music, images, and scholarly books. The site is described in A Companion to J. R. R. Tolkien as "the main source to start a review of the plethora of Tolkien-based online materials." It is referenced in scholarly works such as VII: Journal of the Marion E. Wade Center, Journal of Tolkien Research, and Social Science Computer Review.

=== TheOneRing.net (or TORn) ===
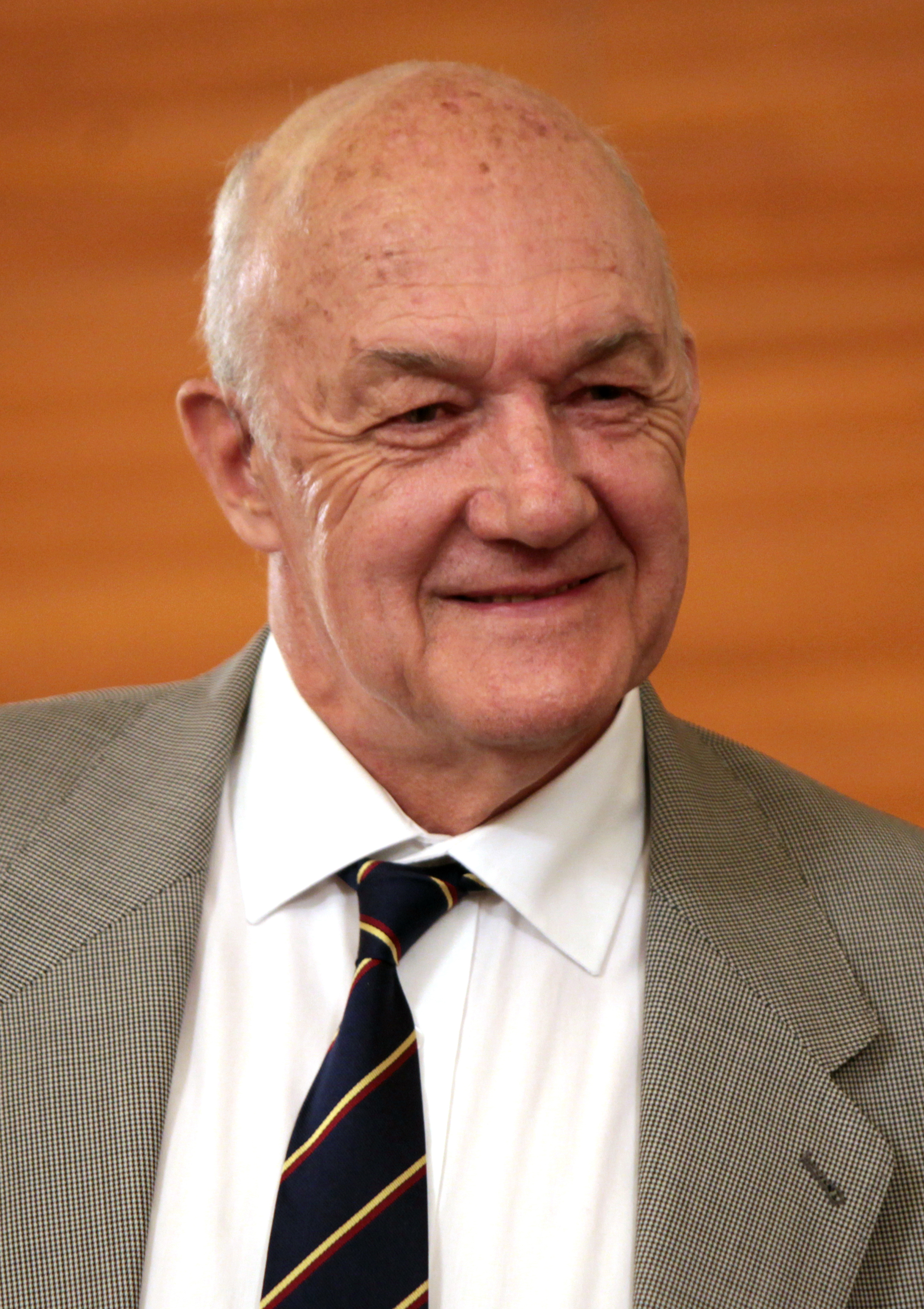
The Tolkien scholar Tom Shippey is renowned among scholars and Tolkienologists.

A fansite of Jackson's movies is TheOneRing.net (TORn), which was popular with the cast and crew of the film series. TORn was originally a small movie-news site. The filmmakers put effort into winning over fans, actively supporting sites for Ringers. The site was founded in 1999 by a group of Tolkien fans eager for the upcoming trilogy. In 1998, Michael 'Xoanon' Regina and Erica 'Tehanu' Challis started a website related to the filming, including "spy" reports from Tehanu's visit to the New Zealand set. This activity got her escorted off the set, and then invited back on to take an official look around and meet director Peter Jackson. In early 1999, a designer by the username of Calisuri came across the site and offered technical help. Calisuri's friend Corvar, who he was acquainted with from the Nightmare LPMud, was brought aboard to provide server and business help. Xoanon, Tehanu, Calisuri and Corvar then formed The One Ring, Inc. and are the sole owners/founders of TheOneRing.net.

The site is unique in having had a mutual working relationship between its crew and that of The Lord of the Rings films, and later of The Hobbit films. This enabled the site to bring its readers exclusive news from the set, as when Peter Jackson emailed TheOneRing.net to get his side heard when a lawsuit threatened his chance to film The Hobbit.

In 2003, Cold Spring Press released TORn's book The People's Guide to J.R.R. Tolkien with essays defending fantasy as a genre, discussions of Tolkien's views of good and evil, and an examination of cultural norms. The foreword by the Tolkien scholar Tom Shippey says: "The Internet, the experience of continually answering questions and receiving comments ... give the organizers of TheOneRing.net a perspective which is uniquely broad, and uniquely full of surprises, some of which would have pleased Tolkien very much, but which he could not have expected." A second volume was published in 2004. Over 1,500 "Ringers" (Lord of the Rings fans) came to the TheOneRing.net Oscar party at the Hollywood, American Legion on 28 February 2004, attended by Jackson, Fran Walsh, Elijah Wood and other cast and crew. On 2 September 2004, eleven commemorative kauri trees, paid for by TORn members, were planted in Willowbank Park in Wellington, New Zealand, Peter Jackson's home town. The number eleven represented the nine members of the Fellowship of the Ring, plus one each for Jackson and Tolkien. TheOneRing.net teamed up with Creation Entertainment to present The One Ring Celebration (ORC) in 2005, 2006, and 2007. Its sister convention, Eastern LOTR Fan Gathering (ELF), met in the eastern U.S. in 2005 and 2006. These conventions included panels and signings by leading members of the cast. In November 2008 and December 2011, TheOneRing.net and Red Carpet Tours staged a 14-night cruise between Auckland and Sydney, including excursions to film locations.

=== Other sites ===
TheOneRing.com (TORc) is a Tolkien fan site that caters more to the fans of Tolkien's literary works than Jackson's films. It was founded by Jonathan Watson, Ted Tschopp and David Mullich in April 1999. As of 2025, Watson has continued to run the website. The site is referenced by Tolkien Studies.

The Encyclopedia of Arda provides a detailed online reference to Middle-earth, mirrored at GlyphWeb.

== Activities ==
=== "Tolkienology" ===
"Tolkienology" is a term used by fans to describe the study of the works of J. R. R. Tolkien treating Middle-earth as a real ancient history, conducting research from an "in-universe" perspective. This differs from Tolkien studies in that it ignores the real-world history of composition by the author, and assumes an underlying internally consistent Middle-earth canon. Tolkienology may include topics such as the astronomy, ethnology, geography, and history of Middle-earth. Fans may speculate on "internal" questions such as the nature of each race and of individual characters. An issue discussed "many times" since the 1980s is whether Frodo and the Ring could have been carried into Mordor by the Eagles. Equally, fans may discuss "external" matters such as Tolkien himself, whether the setting of Middle-earth is medieval or European, and whether the Shire is England, and to what extent Tolkien succeeded in placing himself as the supposed translator of The Lord of the Rings.

=== Linguistics ===
The study of Tolkien's constructed languages (notably Quenya and Sindarin) is a field where fandom and scholarly Tolkien studies overlap. The resulting friction between scholarly students of the languages focusing on their conceptual evolution and fandom-oriented students taking an "in-universe" view became visible in the "Elfconners" controversy of the late 1990s, involving among others the linguists David Salo and Carl F. Hostetter, the editor of Vinyar Tengwar. There is a "reconstructionist" camp, which pursues the reconstruction of unattested Elvish forms, and a "philological" or "purist" camp which focuses entirely on the edition of the fragments in Tolkien's unpublished papers. By its nature, reconstructionism aims for a "canon" of "correct" standard Elvish (Neo-Eldarin), whereas the philological study of the evolution of Tolkien's conceptions rejects the assumption that the languages had ever reached a complete or internally consistent final form. The "reconstructionist" camp is represented by Salo, who translated the poems in the libretto by Fran Walsh and Philippa Boyens for the Music of The Lord of the Rings film series, creating additional words in languages including Sindarin where necessary, while the "purist" camp is represented by Hostetter.

=== Fan fiction ===
Tolkien fan fiction is fantasy fiction, often published on the Internet, by Tolkien fans. It is based either directly on some aspect of Tolkien's books on his fantasy world of Middle-earth, or on a depiction of this world, especially in Peter Jackson's Lord of the Rings film series or other film depictions of that world. A wide range of types of writing have resulted, including homoerotic slash fiction and several strands of feminist storytelling.

=== Fan art ===
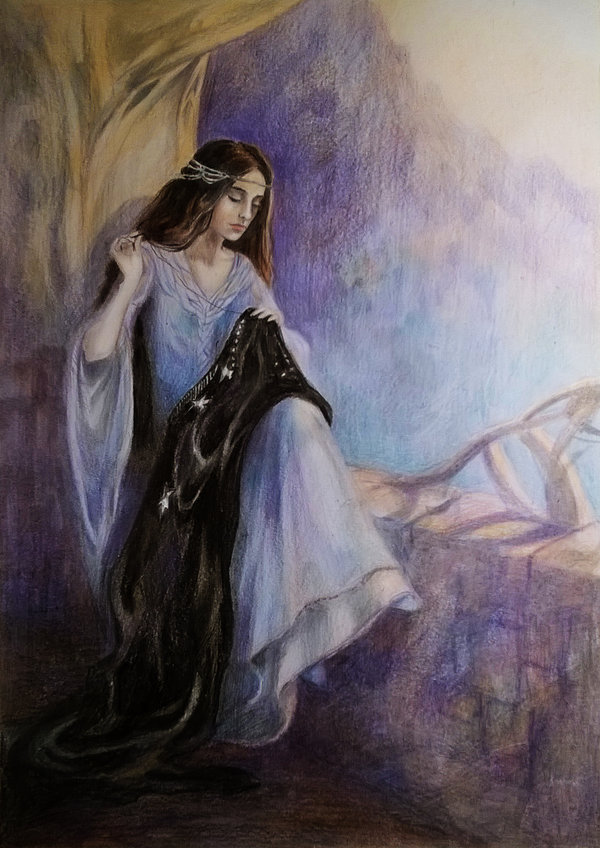
Arwen sewing Aragorn's banner, by Anna Kulisz, 2015

Jackson's films made the work of the artists involved influential, indeed creating a stereotyped image of Middle-earth and its races of Elves, Dwarves, Orcs and Hobbits shared by fans and artists alike. Some fan artists draw inspiration from other sources; Anna Kulisz states that she based her painting of Arwen sewing Aragorn's banner on Edmund Leighton's 1911 painting Stitching the Standard. The German illustrator Anke Eißmann started out creating fan art, illustrating the German Tolkien Society's Der Flammifer von Westernis from 1991. She went on to make numerous paintings of scenes from The Silmarillion. Jenny Dolfen too has made paintings of scenes from The Silmarillion, making the transition from self-taught fan art to becoming a recognised and published artist.

There is a fan edit, describing itself as 'purist', of the theatrical cut (Note: The cinema version.) of The Lord of the Rings: The Two Towers; it is called The Two Towers: The Purist Edit. Most of the changes in 2007 were incorporated into The Lord of the Rings – The Purist Edition, a fan edit which turns the entire trilogy into an eight-hour film without most of the changes.

== By region ==
Dedicated Tolkien Societies provide platforms for a combination of fandom and academic literary study in several countries.

== See also ==
- Tolkienmoot – a gaming convention
- Tolkien tourist – tourism related to Tolkien's books or Jackson's films
- Fantasy fandom – fan activity related to fantasy more generally

== Sources ==
- Broadway, Cliff; Cordova, Carlene. Ringers: Lord of the Fans (2005 documentary; entry at IMDb)
- Burdge, Anthony (2006). "Gaming". In Michael Drout (ed.). The J. R. R. Tolkien Encyclopedia. Routledge.
- Carpenter, Humphrey, ed. (2023) [1981]. The Letters of J. R. R. Tolkien: Revised and Expanded Edition. New York: HarperCollins. ISBN 978-0-35-865298-4.
- Coker, Cait (2022). "Fandom". A Companion to J. R. R. Tolkien (2nd ed.). Wiley-Blackwell. pp. 525–534. ISBN 978-1-119-69140-2.
- Foster, Mike (2006). "America in the 1960s: Reception of Tolkien". In Michael Drout (ed.). The J. R. R. Tolkien Encyclopedia. Routledge.
- Emanuel, Tom (2025). "Aspirational Cultus? Tolkien Fandom at the Borders of Belief". Mythlore. 43 (2). Article 3.
- Kohman, Catherine. Lembas for the Soul: How the Lord of the Rings Enriches Everyday Life (2005), ISBN 978-0-9740841-9-0.
- Spangenberg, Lisa L. (2006). "Technological subcultures, Reception of Tolkien". In Michael Drout (ed.). The J. R. R. Tolkien Encyclopedia. Routledge.
- Sturgis, Amy H. (2006). "Reimagining Rose: Portrayals of Tolkien's Rosie Cotton in Twenty-First Century Fan Fiction". Mythlore. 24 (3). Article 10.
- Viars, Karen; Coker, Cait (2015). "Constructing Lothiriel: Rewriting and Rescuing the Women of Middle-Earth from the Margins". Mythlore. 33 (2): 35–48.
