= Mythlore =

- Discipline: Tolkien studies, fantasy, fanzine
- Language: English

Publication details
- History: 1969-present
- Publisher: Mythopoeic Society (United States)
- Frequency: Biannually

Standard abbreviations
- ISO 4: Mythlore

Indexing
- ISSN: 0146-9339
- OCLC no.: 751166319

Links
- Journal homepage

Mythlore is a biannual (originally quarterly) peer-reviewed academic journal founded by Glen GoodKnight and published by the Mythopoeic Society. Although it publishes articles that explore the genres of myth and fantasy in general, special attention is given to the three most prominent members of the Inklings: J. R. R. Tolkien, C. S. Lewis, and Charles Williams. The current editor-in-chief is the Tolkien scholar Janet Brennan Croft. The Tolkien Society describes Mythlore as a "refereed scholarly journal".

== History ==
Mythlore appeared in January 1969 under the editorship of Glen H. GoodKnight, founder of the Mythopoeic Society. Early issues were fanzines, albeit with a "sercon" ("serious and constructive") bent; for a time it included alternate issues of Mythprint. Mythlore became a peer-reviewed journal beginning with issue #85 (Winter 1999), under the editorship of Theodore Sherman. Since 2006, it has been edited by the Tolkien scholar Janet Brennan Croft.

The full text of Mythlore from 2002 onward is available in Expanded Academic ASAP. Mythlore is also indexed in the Annual Bibliography of English Language and Literature, the Modern Language Association International Bibliography, and other sources. An agreement with JSTOR was announced in 2019. A detailed index (with abstracts) to issues 1-100 was published in January 2008 by The Mythopoeic Press. It has been superseded by an electronic index updated twice a year and available for free download from the journal's website. The journal became online open-access in 2017, and dropped its protection of articles less than one year old in 2019; back issues are available online through an arrangement with Southwestern Oklahoma State University (SWOSU) Library.

Tolkien Journal was an early "sercon" which was absorbed into Mythlore. It was started by New York Tolkien Society founder Richard Plotz in 1965. Dick Plotz stepped down after issue #8 and Ed Meškys took over the society and the journal. In issue #15, Meškys announced the permanent merger of the Tolkien Society of America with the Mythopoeic Society and of Tolkien Journal with Mythlore. When GoodKnight became editor with Mythlore #12, the new Inklings-related subtitle "A Journal of J.R.R. Tolkien, C.S. Lewis, and Charles Williams Studies" replaced Tolkien Journal on the table of contents page.

== See also ==
- Tolkien Studies
