= Janet Brennan Croft =

American author, editor, and Tolkien expert

- Born: 1961 (age 64–65)

Academic background
- Education: Indiana University

Academic work
- Main interests: copyright, J. R. R. Tolkien

Janet Brennan Croft (born 1961) is an American librarian and Tolkien scholar, known for her authored and edited books and journals on J. R. R. Tolkien's Middle-earth fantasy. She won a Mythopoeic Award in 2005 and a Mr. Pointy for best short work in Buffy+ Studies published in 2018.

== Academic career ==
Croft earned a Bachelor of Arts in English and Classical Civilization (double major) from Indiana University in 1982 and graduated as a Master of Library Science in 1983 at the Indiana University School of Library and Information. She has worked at the Carnegie Library of Pittsburgh and has been director and associate professor at Warden Memorial Library, Martin Methodist College. She became the Head of Access Services at Bizzell Memorial Library, University of Oklahoma, in 2001 and earned the rank of associate professor in 2007. In September 2014, she started as Head, Access and Delivery Services at Rutgers University Libraries. and as of 1 July 2018, her title changed to Liaison to the School of Communication and Information and Librarian for Copyright and Disability Services. In August 2020, she became Associate University Librarian for Content Discovery at the University of Northern Iowa. She retired from this position as Librarian Emerita in June 2025. Her research interests focus on copyright laws concerning libraries and the work of J. R. R. Tolkien and other fantasy authors. This includes several academic lectures on Tolkien that she has held at University of Oklahoma.

Since 2006, she has been the editor of Mythlore, a peer-reviewed academic journal published by the Mythopoeic Society. Among general publications on mythology and fantasy, it focuses on the three most prominent members of the Inklings: J. R. R. Tolkien, C. S. Lewis, and Charles Williams. She is credited as "Tolkien Scholar" in Peter Jackson's The Hobbit: An Unexpected Journey. She is also the Associate Editor and Book Review Editor for Slayage, a peer-reviewed academic journal publishing in the area known as Buffy+ Studies.

== Selected publications ==
=== On library science ===
- Croft, Janet Brennan (2004). Legal Solutions in Electronic Reserves and the Electronic Delivery of Interlibrary Loan. Haworth Information Press. ISBN 0-7890-2558-2. The book has been reviewed as valuable guide for academic libraries.
- — (2005). "Interlibrary Loan and Licensing: Tools for Proactive Contract Management". In Rupp-Serrano, Karen (ed.). Licensing in Libraries: Practical And Ethical Aspects. Haworth Press. pp. 41–53. ISBN 978-0789028792.

=== On Tolkien ===
- Croft, Janet Brennan (2004). War and the works of J.R.R. Tolkien. Greenwood Publishing Group. ISBN 978-0313325922. In this book, Croft draws parallels between Tolkien's traumatic experiences as a soldier in World War I and the events and characters of his legendarium.
- —, ed. (2005). Tolkien on Film: Essays on Peter Jackson's The Lord of the Rings. Mythopoeic Press. ISBN 978-1887726092. In a 2006 review, film theorist Kristin Thompson was critical of the undertaking of film studies by literary researchers and the frequent denigration of Jackson's work in the collected essays.
- —, ed. (2006). Tolkien and Shakespeare: Essays on Shared Themes and Language. McFarland & Company. ISBN 978-0786428274.
- — (2007). "Three Rings for Hollywood: Scripts for The Lord of the Rings". In Stratyner, Leslie; Keller, James R. (eds.). Fantasy Fiction into Film. McFarland & Company. pp. 21–35. ISBN 9780786430574. An essay on the various pre-Peter Jackson scripts for The Lord of the Rings.
- —; Donovan, Leslie A., eds. (2015). Perilous and Fair: Women in the Works and Life of J. R. R. Tolkien. Mythopoeic Press. ISBN 978-1-887726-01-6.
