= Mythopoeic Society =

Nonprofit organization

- Status: Active
- Genre: Mythopoeia
- Venue: Michigan State University
- Location: East Lansing, Michigan
- Country: United States
- Inaugurated: 1967; 59 years ago
- Attendance: 100–200
- Organizer: Mythopoeic Society
- Filing status: Non-profit
- Website: www.mythsoc.org

The Mythopoeic Society (MythSoc) is a non-profit organization devoted to the study of mythopoeic literature, particularly the works of J. R. R. Tolkien, Charles Williams, and C. S. Lewis. These men were all members of the Inklings, an informal group of writers who met weekly in Lewis' rooms at Magdalen College, Oxford, from the early 1930s until late 1949.

== History ==
The Mythopoeic Society was founded in 1967 by Glen H. GoodKnight. Originally composed of discussion groups based in the Los Angeles area, it expanded to include organized branches across North America; in 1972 it assimilated the Tolkien Society of America. Membership is open to those who read, study, or write in the genres of myth and fantasy.

== Publications ==
Three periodical publications are produced by the society:

- Mythprint is a quarterly newsletter with notices of Society activity, book reviews and articles; Mythopoeic Society membership includes electronic Mythprint (PDF), also available in print format by subscription.
- Mythlore, edited by Janet Brennan Croft, publishes peer-reviewed articles on mythic and fantastic works, available by subscription; since 2017, back numbers are freely available at an archive provided by SWOSU.
- The Mythic Circle is a collection of original fiction and poetry, published yearly, and available by subscription.

In addition to the periodicals, the society formed The Mythopoeic Press to publish material by and about writers of mythopoeic and fantastic literature, especially focused on the Inklings. Works published include out-of-print materials, collections of short articles and essays, and scholarly items.

== Activities ==
The society sponsors local discussion groups throughout the United States and the Annual Mythopoeic Conference, also known as Mythcon, generally held on college or university campuses in various locations, primarily within the United States. Mythcon XX was held in Vancouver, British Columbia, in 1989. Mythcon XXIII was held at Keble College, Oxford, England, in 1992 as part of The J. R. R. Tolkien Centenary Conference, co-sponsored with The Tolkien Society. Likewise, Mythcon XXXVI in 2005 was held at Aston University, Birmingham, England, combined with Tolkien 2005 - 50 Years of The Lord of the Rings, sponsored by The Tolkien Society.

== Mythopoeic Awards ==
Since 1971 the Mythopoeic Society has bestowed a series of annual awards to outstanding works. In 1991 the literary award was broken into two categories: the Mythopoeic Fantasy Award for Adult Literature and the Mythopoeic Fantasy Award for Children’s Literature.

The Mythopoeic Scholarship Award in Inklings Studies is given to books on J.R.R. Tolkien, C.S. Lewis, or Charles Williams that make significant contributions to Inklings scholarship. The Mythopoeic Scholarship Award in Myth and Fantasy Studies is given to scholarly books on other specific authors in the Inklings tradition, or to more general works on the genres of myth and fantasy. For the scholarship awards, books first published during the previous three years are eligible, including finalists for previous years.

== See also ==
- Mythopoeic literature
- Science fiction studies
- The Tolkien Society
- Tolkien fandom
