= Elves in Middle-earth =

Humanoid race from J. R. R. Tolkien's Middle-earth

In J. R. R. Tolkien's writings, Elves are the first fictional race to appear in Middle-earth. Unlike Men and Dwarves, Elves do not die of disease or old age. Should they die in battle or of grief, their souls go to the Halls of Mandos in Aman. After a long life in Middle-earth, Elves yearn for the Earthly Paradise of Valinor, and can sail there from the Grey Havens. They are prominent in The Hobbit and The Lord of the Rings, and their history is described in detail in The Silmarillion.

Tolkien derived Elves from mentions in the ancient poetry and languages of Northern Europe, especially Old English. These suggested to him that Elves were large, dangerous, beautiful, lived in wild natural places, and practised archery. He invented languages for the Elves, including Sindarin and Quenya.

Tolkien-style Elves have become a staple of fantasy literature. They have appeared, too, in film and role-playing game adaptations of Tolkien's works.

== Origins ==
=== Icelandic folklore ===
The framework for J. R. R. Tolkien's conception of his Elves, and many points of detail in his portrayal of them, is thought by Haukur Þorgeirsson to have come from the survey of folklore and early modern scholarship about elves (álfar) in Icelandic tradition in Jón Árnason's introduction to his Íslenzkar þjóðsögur og æfintýri ('Icelandic legends and fairy tales'). It covered stories from the 17th century onwards, noting that elves are the firstborn race; (Note: In its case, the other two races are the sea elves (mermen) and the ljúflings (of rocks and hills).) that they could marry humans; and that they lack an immortal soul. The Tolkien scholar Tom Shippey writes that the Eddaic Hjaðningavíg provides a "master-text" for Tolkien's interpretation of the Elves, and in particular their "master-quality" of evasiveness.

=== Germanic word ===
The modern English word Elf derives from the Old English word ælf (with cognates in all other Germanic languages). Numerous types of elves appear in Germanic mythology; the West Germanic concept appears to have come to differ from the Scandinavian notion in the early Middle Ages, and the Anglo-Saxon concept diverged even further, possibly under Celtic influence. J. R. R. Tolkien made it clear in a letter that his Elves differed from those "of the better known lore" (Note: Carpenter 2023, #25, to the editor of The Observer, printed 20 February 1938) of Scandinavian mythology.

=== Halfway beings ===
The Tolkien scholar Tom Shippey notes that one Middle English source which he presumes Tolkien must have read, the South English Legendary from c. 1250, describes elves much as Tolkien does:

South English Legendary "St Michael" 253-258	Modern English
And ofte in fourme of wommane : In many derne weye grete compaygnie mon i-seoth of heom : boþe hoppie and pleiƺe, Þat Eluene beoth i-cleopede : and ofte heo comiez to toune, And bi daye muche in wodes heo beoth : and bi niƺte ope heiƺe dounes. Þat beoth þe wrechche gostes : Þat out of heuene weren i-nome, And manie of heom a-domesday : Ʒeot schullen to reste come.	And often shaped like women: On many secret paths men see great numbers of them: dancing and sporting. These are called Elves: and often they come to town and by day they are much in the woods: by night up on the high downs. Those are the wretched spirits: that were taken out of Heaven, And at Doomsday many of them shall come to rest.

Some of Tolkien's Elves are in the "undying lands" of Valinor, home of the godlike Valar, while others are in Middle-earth. The Elf-queen Galadriel indeed has been expelled from Valinor, much like the fallen Melkor, though she is clearly good, and much like an angel. Similarly, some of the Legendary's Eluene are on Earth, others in the "Earthly Paradise". So, did they have souls, Shippey asks? Since they could not leave the world, the answer was no; but given that they didn't disappear completely on death, the answer had to have been yes. In Shippey's view, the Silmarillion resolved the Middle English puzzle, letting Elves go not to Heaven but to the halfway house of the Halls of Mandos on Valinor.

=== Elf or fairy ===
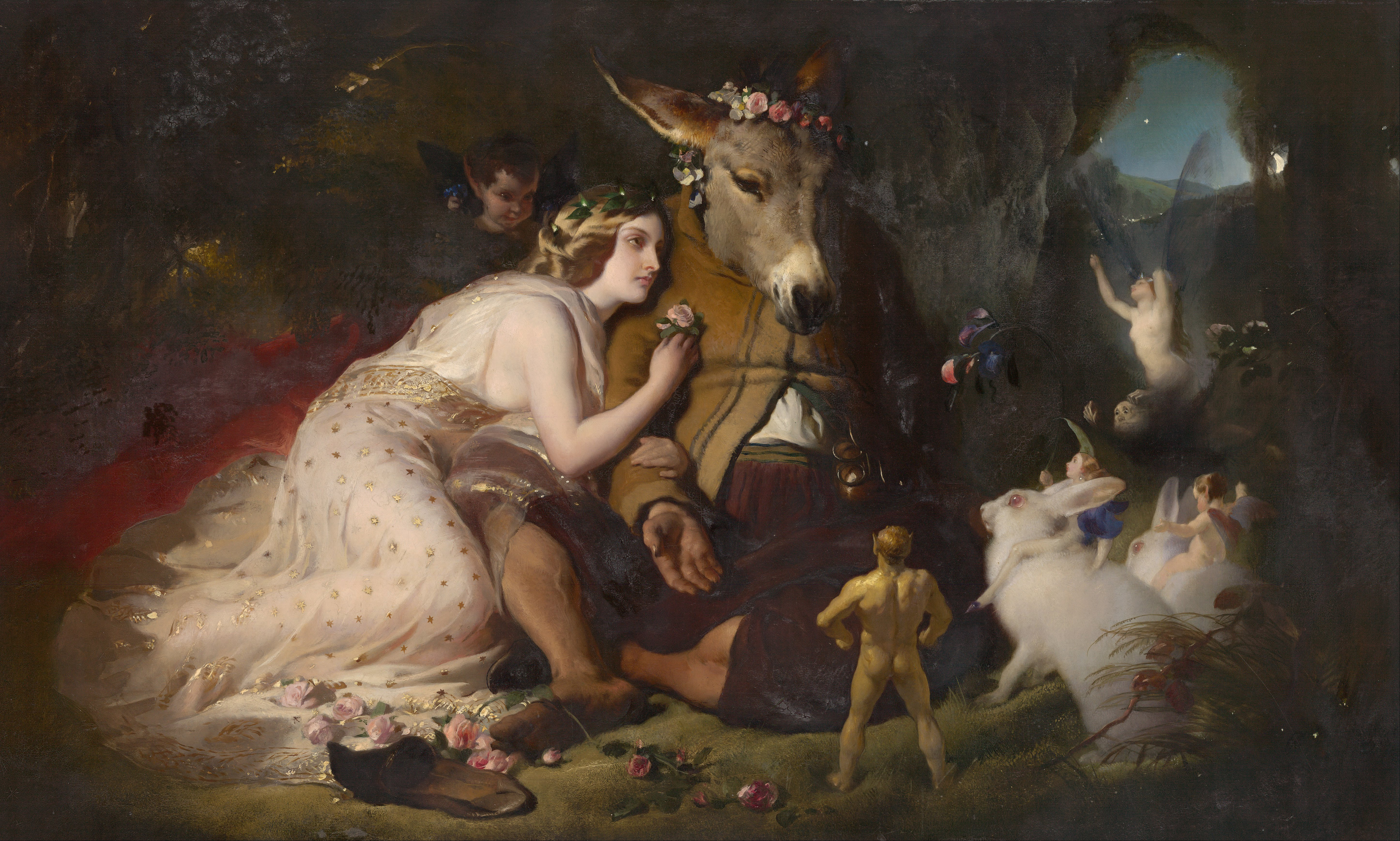
Victorian era Fairy painting: Edwin Landseer, Scene from A Midsummer Night's Dream. Titania and Bottom, 1851

By the late 19th century, the term 'fairy' had been taken up as a utopian theme, and was used to critique social and religious values, a tradition which Tolkien and T. H. White continued. One of the last of the Victorian Fairy-paintings, The Piper of Dreams by Estella Canziani, sold 250,000 copies and was well known within the trenches of World War I where Tolkien saw active service. Illustrated posters of Robert Louis Stevenson's poem Land of Nod had been sent out by a philanthropist to brighten servicemen's quarters, and Faery was used in other contexts as an image of "Old England" to inspire patriotism. By 1915, when Tolkien was writing his first elven poems, the words elf, fairy and gnome had many divergent and contradictory associations. Tolkien had been gently warned against the term 'fairy', which John Garth supposes may have been due to its growing association with homosexuality, but Tolkien continued to use it. According to Marjorie Burns, Tolkien eventually but hesitantly chose the term elf over fairy. In his 1939 essay On Fairy-Stories, Tolkien wrote that "English words such as elf have long been influenced by French (from which fay and faërie, fairy are derived); but in later times, through their use in translation, fairy and elf have acquired much of the atmosphere of German, Scandinavian, and Celtic tales, and many characteristics of the huldu-fólk, the daoine-sithe, and the tylwyth-teg."

=== Reconciling multiple traditions ===
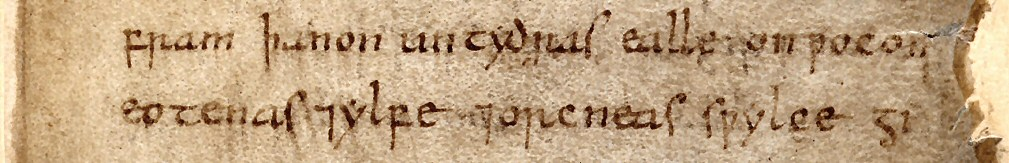
Beowulf's eotenas [ond] ylfe [ond] orcneas, "ogres [and] elves [and] devil-corpses", inspiring Tolkien to create orcs, elves, and other races

Tolkien, a philologist, knew of the many seemingly contradictory traditions about elves. The Old English Beowulf-poet spoke of the strange eotenas ond ylfe ond orcnéas, "ettens [giants] and elves and demon-corpses", a grouping which Shippey calls "a very stern view of all non-human and un-Christian species". The Middle English Sir Gawain meets a green axe-wielding giant, an aluisch mon ("elvish man", translated by Shippey as "uncanny creature"). Christian sources from Iceland knew and disapproved of the tradition of offering sacrifices to the elves, álfa-blót.

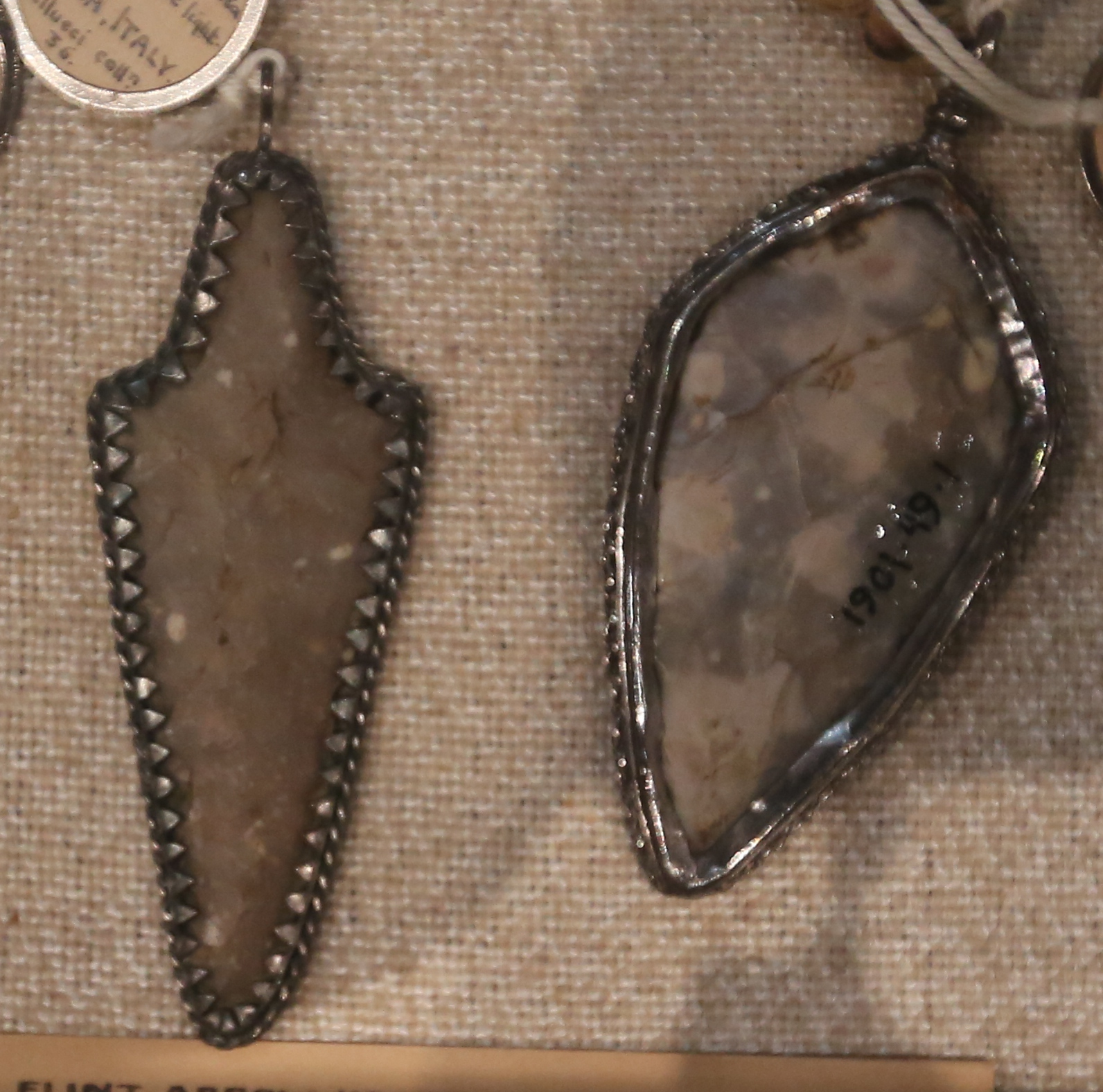
Elf-shot, associated with "elf arrows", Neolithic flint arrowheads sometimes used as amulets, was one of the hints Tolkien used to create his Elves.

Elves were directly dangerous, too: the medical condition "elf-shot", described in the spell Gif hors ofscoten sie, "if a horse is elf-shot", meaning some kind of internal injury, was associated both with Neolithic flint arrowheads and the temptations of the devil. Tolkien takes "elf-shot" as a hint to make his elves skilful in archery. Another danger was wæterælfádl, "water-elf disease", perhaps meaning dropsy, while a third condition was ælfsogoða, "elf-pain", glossed by Shippey as "lunacy". All the same, an Icelandic woman could be frið sem álfkona, "fair as an elf-woman", while the Anglo-Saxons might call a very fair woman ælfscýne, "elf-beautiful". Some aspects can readily be reconciled, Shippey writes, since "Beauty is itself dangerous". But there is more: Tolkien brought in the Old English usage of descriptions like wuduælfen "wood-elf, dryad", wæterælfen "water-elf", and sǣælfen "sea-elf, naiad", giving his elves strong links with wild nature. Yet another strand of legend holds that Elfland, as in Elvehøj ("Elf Hill") and other traditional stories, is dangerous to mortals because time there is distorted, as in Tolkien's Lothlórien. Shippey comments that it is a strength of Tolkien's "re-creations", his imagined worlds, that they incorporate all the available evidence to create a many-layered impression of depth, making use of "both good and bad sides of popular story; the sense of inquiry, prejudice, hearsay and conflicting opinion".

Shippey suggests that the "fusion or kindling-point" of Tolkien's thinking about elves came from the Middle English lay Sir Orfeo, which transposes the classical myth of Orpheus and Eurydice into a wild and wooded Elfland, and makes the quest successful. In Tolkien's translation the elves appear and disappear: "the king of Faerie with his rout / came hunting in the woods about / with blowing far and crying dim, and barking hounds that were with him; yet never a beast they took nor slew, and where they went he never knew". Shippey comments that Tolkien took many suggestions from this passage, including the horns and the hunt of the Elves in Mirkwood; the proud but honourable Elf-king; and the placing of his elves in wild nature. Tolkien might only have had broken fragments to work on, but, Shippey writes, the more one explores how Tolkien used the ancient texts, the more one sees "how easy it was for him to feel that a consistency and a sense lay beneath the chaotic ruin of the old poetry of the North".

Tolkien's Sundering of the Elves allowed him to explain the existence of Norse mythology's Light Elves, who live in Alfheim ("Elfhome") and correspond to his Calaquendi, and Dark Elves, who live underground in Svartalfheim ("Black Elfhome") and whom he "rehabilitates" as his Moriquendi, the Elves who never went to see the light of the Two Trees of Valinor.

Tolkien's multiple medieval sources for Elves
Medieval source	Term	Idea
Beowulf	eotenas ond ylfe ond orcnéas: "ettens, elves, and devil-corpses"	Elves are strong and dangerous.
Sir Gawain and the Green Knight	The Green Knight is an aluisch mon: "elvish man, uncanny creature"	Elves have strange powers.
Sir Orfeo	"the king of Faerie with his rout / came hunting in the woods about"	Elves live in the wildwood.
Magical spell	ofscoten: "elf-shot"	Elves are archers.
Icelandic and Old English usage	frið sem álfkona: "fair as an elf-woman"; ælfscýne: "elf-beautiful"	Elves are beautiful.
Old English usage	wuduælfen, wæterælfen, sǣælfen: "dryads, water-elves, naiads"	Elves are strongly connected to nature.
Scandinavian ballad Elvehøj	Mortal visitors to Elfland are in danger, as time seems different there.	Time is distorted in Elfland.
Norse mythology	Dökkálfar, Ljósálfar: "dark elves, light elves"	Elves are sundered into multiple groups.

== Development ==
Tolkien developed his conception of elves over the years, from his earliest writings through to The Hobbit, The Silmarillion, and The Lord of the Rings.

=== Early writings ===
Traditional Victorian dancing fairies and elves appear in much of Tolkien's early poetry, and have influence upon his later works, in part due to the influence of a production of J. M. Barrie's Peter Pan in Birmingham in 1910, and his familiarity with the work of the Catholic mystic poet, Francis Thompson which Tolkien had acquired in 1914.

O! I hear the tiny horns
Of enchanted leprechauns
And the padded feet of many gnomes a-coming!

— J. R. R. Tolkien, Goblin Feet, 1915

=== The Book of Lost Tales (c. 1917–1927) ===
In his The Book of Lost Tales, Tolkien develops a theme that the diminutive fairy-like race of Elves had once been a great and mighty people, and that as Men took over the world, these Elves had "diminished" themselves. This theme is shared especially by the god-like and human-sized Ljósálfar of Norse mythology, and medieval works such as Sir Orfeo, the Welsh Mabinogion, Arthurian romances and the legends of the Tuatha Dé Danann. (Note: Tolkien 1937, p. 120)

The name Inwe or Ingwë (in the first draft Ing), given by Tolkien to the eldest of the elves and his clan, (Note: Tolkien 1987, p. 171, The Lhammas) is similar to the name of the god Ingwi-Freyr in Norse mythology, a god who is gifted the elf-world Álfheimr. Terry Gunnell finds the relationship between beautiful ships and the Elves reminiscent of the god Njörðr and the god Freyr's ship Skíðblaðnir. He also retains the usage of the French derived term "fairy" for the same creatures.

The larger Elves are inspired by Tolkien's personal Catholic theology, representing the state of Men in Eden who have not yet fallen, like humans but fairer and wiser, with greater spiritual powers, keener senses, and a closer empathy with nature. Tolkien wrote of them: "They are made by man in his own image and likeness; but freed from those limitations which he feels most to press upon him. They are immortal, and their will is directly effective for the achievement of imagination and desire."

In The Book of Lost Tales, Tolkien includes both more serious "medieval" elves such as Fëanor and Turgon alongside frivolous, Jacobean elves such as the Solosimpi and Tinúviel. Alongside the idea of the greater Elves, Tolkien toyed with the idea of children visiting Valinor, the island-homeland of the Elves in their sleep. Elves would also visit children at night and comfort them if they had been chided or were upset. This was abandoned in Tolkien's later writing. (Note: Tolkien 1984, p. 31, The Cottage of Lost Play)

=== The Hobbit (c. 1930–1937) ===
Douglas Anderson shows that in The Hobbit, Tolkien again includes both the more serious 'medieval' type of elves, such as Elrond and the wood-elf king, Thranduil, and frivolous elves, such as the elvish guards at Rivendell.

=== The Quenta Silmarillion (c. 1937) ===
In 1937, having had his manuscript for The Silmarillion rejected by a publisher who disparaged all the "eye-splitting Celtic names" that Tolkien had given his Elves, Tolkien denied the names had a Celtic origin: (Note: Carpenter 2023, #26 to Stanley Unwin, 4 March 1938)

Needless to say they are not Celtic! Neither are the tales. I do know Celtic things (many in their original languages Irish and Welsh), and feel for them a certain distaste: largely for their fundamental unreason. They have bright colour, but are like a broken stained glass window reassembled without design. They are in fact "mad" as your reader says – but I don't believe I am.

Dimitra Fimi proposes that these comments are a product of his Anglophilia rather than a commentary on the texts themselves or their actual influence on his writing, and cites evidence to this effect in her essay "'Mad' Elves and 'elusive beauty': some Celtic strands of Tolkien's mythology". Fimi proposes that some of the stories Tolkien wrote as elven history are directly influenced by Celtic mythology. For example, "Flight of The Noldoli" she argues, is based on the Tuatha Dé Danann and Lebor Gabála Érenn, and their migratory nature comes from early Irish/Celtic history. John Garth states that with the underground enslavement of the Noldoli to Melkor, Tolkien was essentially rewriting Irish myth regarding the Tuatha Dé Danann into a Christian eschatology.

=== The Lord of the Rings (c. 1937–1949) ===
In The Lord of the Rings Tolkien pretends to be merely the translator of Bilbo and Frodo's memoirs, collectively known as the Red Book of Westmarch. He says that those names and terms that appear in English are meant to be his purported translations from the Common Speech. (Note: Tolkien 1955, Appendix F)

According to Shippey, the theme of diminishment from semi-divine Elf to diminutive Fairy resurfaces in The Lord of the Rings in the dialogue of Galadriel. "Yet if you succeed, then our power is diminished, and Lothlórien will fade, and the tides of Time will sweep it away. We must depart into the West, or dwindle to a rustic folk of dell and cave, slowly to forget and to be forgotten." (Note: Tolkien 1954a book 2, ch. 7 "The Mirror of Galadriel")

Writing in 1954, part way through proofreading The Lord of the Rings, Tolkien claimed that the Elvish language Sindarin had a character very like British-Welsh "because it seems to fit the rather 'Celtic' type of legends and stories told of its speakers". (Note: Carpenter 2023, #144 to Naomi Mitchison, 25 April 1954) In the same letter, Tolkien goes on to say that the elves had very little in common with elves or fairies of Europe, and that they really represent men with greater artistic ability, beauty and a longer life span. In his writings, an Elven bloodline was the only real claim to 'nobility' that the Men of Middle-earth could have. Tolkien wrote that the elves are primarily to blame for many of the ills of Middle-earth in The Lord of the Rings, having independently created the Three Rings to stop their domains in mortal-lands from 'fading' and attempting to prevent inevitable change and new growth.

== Fictional history ==
=== Awakening ===
Arda in the First Age, with the sundering of the Elves. The Elves awoke at Cuiviénen, on the Sea of Helcar (right) in Middle-earth, and many of them migrated westwards to Valinor in Aman, though some stopped in Beleriand (top), and others returned to Beleriand later.

The first Elves were awakened by Eru Ilúvatar near the bay of Cuiviénen during the Years of the Trees. This event marked the beginning of the First Age. They awoke under the starlit sky, as the Sun and Moon had yet to be created. The first Elves to awaken were three pairs: Imin ("First") and his wife Iminyë, Tata ("Second") and Tatië, and Enel ("Third") and Enelyë. They walked through the forests, finding other pairs of Elves, who became their folk. They lived by the rivers, and invented poetry and music in Middle-earth. Journeying further, they came across tall and dark-haired elves, the fathers of most of the Noldor. They invented many new words. Continuing their journey, they found elves singing without language, the ancestors of most of the Teleri. (Note: Tolkien 1994, "Quendi and Eldar") The elves were discovered by the Vala Oromë, who brought the news of their awakening to Valinor. (Note: Tolkien 1977, ch. 3 "Of the Coming of the Elves and the Captivity of Melkor")

=== Sundering ===
The Valar decided to summon the Elves to Valinor rather than leaving them where they were first awakened, near the Cuiviénen lake in the eastern extremity of Middle-earth. They sent Oromë, who took Ingwë, Finwë and Elwë as ambassadors to Valinor. Returning to Middle-earth, Ingwë, Finwë and Elwë convinced many of the Elves to take the Great Journey (also called the Great March) to Valinor. Those who did not accept the summons became known as the Avari, The Unwilling. The others were called Eldar, the People of the Stars by Oromë, and they took Ingwë, Finwë and Elwë as their leaders, and became respectively the Vanyar, Noldor and Teleri (who spoke Vanyarin Quenya, Noldorin Quenya, and Telerin, respectively). On their journey, some of the Teleri feared the Misty Mountains and dared not cross them. They turned back and stayed in the vales of the Anduin, and, led by Lenwë, became the Nandor, who spoke Nandorin. Oromë led the others over the Misty Mountains and Ered Lindon into Beleriand. There Elwë became lost, and the Teleri stayed behind looking for him. The Vanyar and the Noldor moved onto a floating island, Tol Eressëa, that was moved by Ulmo to Valinor. After years, Ulmo returned to Beleriand to seek out the remaining Teleri. Without Elwë, many of the Teleri took his brother Olwë as their leader and were ferried to Valinor. Some Teleri stayed behind though, still looking for Elwë, and others stayed on the shores, being called by Ossë. They took Círdan as their leader and became the Falathrim. The Teleri who stayed in Beleriand later became known as the Sindar.

Matthew Dickerson notes the "very complicated changes, with shifting meanings assigned to the same names" as Tolkien worked on his conception of the elves and their divisions and migrations. He states that the sundering of the elves allowed Tolkien, a professional philologist, to develop two languages, distinct but related, Quenya for the Eldar and Sindarin for the Sindar, citing Tolkien's own statement that the stories were made to create a world for the languages, not the reverse. Dickerson cites the Tolkien scholar Tom Shippey's suggestion that the "real root" of The Silmarillion lay in the linguistic relationship, complete with sound-changes and differences of semantics, between these two languages of the divided elves. Shippey writes, too, that the elves are separated not by colour, despite names like light and dark, but by history, including their migrations.

=== Exile ===
In Valinor, Fëanor, son of Finwë, and the greatest of the Elves, created the Silmarils in which he stored a part of the light of the Two Trees that were lighting Valinor. (Note: Tolkien 1977, ch. 7, "Of the Silmarils and the Unrest of the Noldor") After three ages in the Halls of Mandos, Melkor was released, feigning reform. He however spread his evil and started to poison the minds of the Elves against the Valar. Eventually he killed Finwë and stole the Silmarils. Fëanor then named him Morgoth (Sindarin: The Black Enemy). Fëanor and his seven sons then swore to take the Silmarils back, and led a large army of the Noldor to Beleriand. (Note: Tolkien 1977, ch. 9, "Of the Flight of the Noldor")

=== Wars of Beleriand ===
In Beleriand, Elwë was eventually found, and married Melian the Maia. He became the overlord of Beleriand, naming himself Thingol (Sindarin: Grey-cloak). After the First Battle of Beleriand, during the first rising of the Moon, the Noldor arrived in Beleriand. They laid a siege around Morgoth's fortress of Angband, but were eventually defeated. (Note: Tolkien 1977, ch. 13, "Of the Return of the Noldor") The Elves never regained the upper hand, finally losing the hidden kingdoms Nargothrond, Doriath, and Gondolin near the culmination of the war. (Note: Tolkien 1977, ch. 22, "Of the Ruin of Doriath") (Note: Tolkien 1977, ch. 23, "Of Tuor and the Fall of Gondolin") When the Elves had been forced to the furthest southern reaches of Beleriand, Eärendil the Mariner, a half-elf from the House of Finwë, sailed to Valinor to ask the Valar for help. The Valar started the War of Wrath, finally defeating Morgoth. (Note: 'Tolkien 1977, ch. 24, "Of the Voyage of Earendil and the War of Wrath")

=== Second and Third Ages ===
After the War of Wrath, the Valar tried to summon the Elves back to Valinor. Many complied, but some stayed. During the Second Age they founded the Realms of Lindon (all that was left of Beleriand after the cataclysm), Eregion, and Rhovanion (Mirkwood). Sauron, Morgoth's former servant, made war upon them, but with the aid of the Númenóreans they defeated him, though both the king of the Noldorin Elves, Gil-galad, and Elendil, king of the Númenóreans, were killed. During the Second and Third Ages, they held some protected realms with the aid of the Three Rings of Power: Lothlorien, ruled by Galadriel and Celeborn; Rivendell, ruled by Elrond and home to the Elf-lord Glorfindel; and the Grey Havens, ruled by Círdan the shipwright. Círdan and his Elves built the ships on which Elves departed for Valinor. (Note: Tolkien 1977, "Of the Rings of Power and the Third Age")

=== Fourth Age ===
After the destruction of the One Ring, the power of the Three Rings of the Elves ended and the Fourth Age, the Age of Men, began. Most Elves left for Valinor; those that remained in Middle-earth were doomed to a slow decline until, in the words of Galadriel, they faded and became a "rustic folk of dell and cave". The fading played out over thousands of years, until in the modern world, occasional glimpses of rustic Elves would fuel folktales and fantasies. Elladan and Elrohir, the sons of Elrond, did not accompany their father when the White Ship bearing the Ring-bearer and the chief Noldorin leaders sailed from the Grey Havens to Valinor; they remained in Lindon. Celeborn and other elves of the Grey Havens remained for a while before leaving for Valinor. Legolas founded an elf colony in Ithilien during King Elessar's reign; the elves there helped to rebuild Gondor, living mainly in southern Ithilien, along the shores of the Anduin. After Elessar's death, Legolas built a ship and sailed to Valinor and, eventually, all the elves in Ithilien followed him. (Note: Tolkien 1955, Appendix B: "Later Events Concerning the Members of the Fellowship of the Ring")

In "The Tale of Aragorn and Arwen" in Appendix A, most Elves have already left, barring some in Mirkwood and a few in Lindon; the garden of Elrond in Rivendell is empty. Arwen flees to an abandoned Lothlórien, where she dies. (Note: Tolkien 1955, Appendix A, 1. v. "The Tale of Aragorn and Arwen")

== Characteristics ==
=== Appearance ===
Tolkien describes elves as "tall, fair of skin and grey-eyed, though their locks were dark, save in the golden house of Finarfin." (Note: Tolkien 1955, Appendix F) The Vanyar were called "The Fair" for their golden hair. (Note: Tolkien 1977, Index, "Vanyar") Maeglin is said to have been "tall and black-haired" and "his skin was white." (Note: Tolkien 1977, ch. 16 "Of Maeglin") Túrin, a Man, was called Elf-man due to his appearance and speech, and described as "dark-haired and pale-skinned, with grey eyes." (Note: Tolkien 1977, ch. 21 "Of Túrin Turambar")

=== Marriage ===
Elves, at least the Eldar, have a pregnancy that lasts about a year. By the age of 1, Elves can speak, walk and dance. Puberty and full height are attained at around their fiftieth to one hundredth year, when they stop aging physically. (Note: Tolkien 1993, "Laws and Customs among the Eldar") Elves marry early in life: freely, monogamously, only once, and for love; adultery is unthinkable. Betrothal, with the exchange of rings, lasts at least a year, and is revocable by the return of the rings, but is rarely broken. Marriage is by words exchanged by the bride and groom (including the speaking of the name of Eru Ilúvatar) and consummation; it is celebrated with a feast. Wedding rings are worn on the index fingers. The bride's mother gives the groom a jewel to wear. Elves view the sexual act as special and intimate, for it leads to the birth of children. Elves are never recorded as raping another's spouse, and an early draft states that such an act would cause the victim's spirit to depart to Mandos. Elves have few children, (Note: An exception was Fëanor, who had seven sons. (Note: Tolkien 1977, ch. 5 "Of Eldamar and the Princes of the Eldalië")) and there are long intervals between each child. They are soon preoccupied with other pleasures; their libido wanes and they focus their interests elsewhere, like the arts.

=== Skill ===
Elves, particularly the Noldor, spend their time on smithwork, sculpture, music and other arts, and on preparing food. Males and females are equal, but females often specialize in the arts of healing while the males go to war. This is because they believe that taking life interferes with the ability to preserve life. However, females can defend themselves at need as well as males, and many males such as Elrond are skilled healers. Elves are skilful horse-riders, riding without saddle or bridle, though Tolkien was inconsistent on this point.

=== Elvish languages ===
Tolkien created many languages for his Elves. His interest was primarily philological, and he said his stories grew out of his languages. Indeed, the languages were the first thing Tolkien ever created for his mythos, starting with what he originally called "Elfin" or "Qenya" [sic]. This was later spelled Quenya (High-elven); it and Sindarin (Grey-elven) are the most complete of Tolkien's constructed languages. Elves are also credited with creating the Tengwar (by Fëanor) and Cirth (Daeron) scripts.

=== Death and immortality ===
Elves are immortal, and remain unwearied with age. They can recover from wounds which would be fatal to a Man, but can be killed in battle. Spirits of dead Elves go to the Halls of Mandos in Valinor. After a certain period of time and rest that serves as "cleansing", their spirits are clothed in bodies identical to their old ones. (Note: Tolkien 1993, The Converse of Manwë and Eru, pp. 361–364) If they do not die in battle or accident, (Note: Míriel however is so exhausted by the birth of her fiery and creative son Fëanor, that she wilfully gives up her spirit.) Elves eventually grow weary of Middle-earth and desire to go to Valinor; (Note: Tolkien 1977, ch. 1 "Of the Beginning of Days") they often sail from the Grey Havens, where Círdan the Shipwright dwells with his folk. (Note: Tolkien 1977, ch. 20 "Of the Fifth Battle: Nirnaeth Arnoediad" "At the bidding of Turgon Círdan built seven swift ships, and they sailed out into the West") (Note: Tolkien 1977, "Of the Rings of Power and the Third Age" "at the Grey Havens of Lindon there abode also a remnant of the people of Gil-galad the Elvenking. ... building and tending the elven-ships wherein those of the Firstborn who grew weary of the world set sail into the uttermost West. Círdan the Shipwright was lord of the Havens") Eventually, any Elves that remain in Middle-earth undergo a process of "fading", in which their immortal spirits overwhelm and "consume" their bodies. This renders their bodily forms invisible to mortal eyes, except to those to whom they wish to manifest themselves. (Note: Tolkien 1993, "Myths Transformed", XI)

Fates of Elves and Men in Tolkien's legendarium. Elves are immortal but can be killed in battle, in which case they go to the Halls of Mandos in Aman. They may be restored by the Will of the Valar, and then go to live with the Valar in Valinor, like an Earthly Paradise, though just being in the place does not confer immortality, as Men supposed. Men are mortal, and when they die they go beyond the circles of the world, even the Elves not knowing where that might be.

== Adaptations ==
Wood elves as portrayed in the 1977 Rankin-Bass version of The Hobbit look nothing like those in any other adaptation.

The 1977 Rankin-Bass version of The Hobbit depicts the wood-elves in what Austin Gilkeson calls a weird way, quite unlike the elves in any other adaptation, not even resembling the film's depiction of Elrond. Gilkeson describes them as "like Troll dolls that have been left out in the rain too long, and a little like Yzma from The Emperor's New Groove. They have gray skin, pug faces, and blond hair. It's frankly bizarre".

Elf soldiers in Peter Jackson's The Lord of the Rings: The Fellowship of the Ring are depicted as physically superior to Men.

In Peter Jackson's Lord of the Rings film series (2001–2003), Elves are shown as physically superior to Men in eyesight, balance, and aim, but their superiority in other ways is "never really made clear".

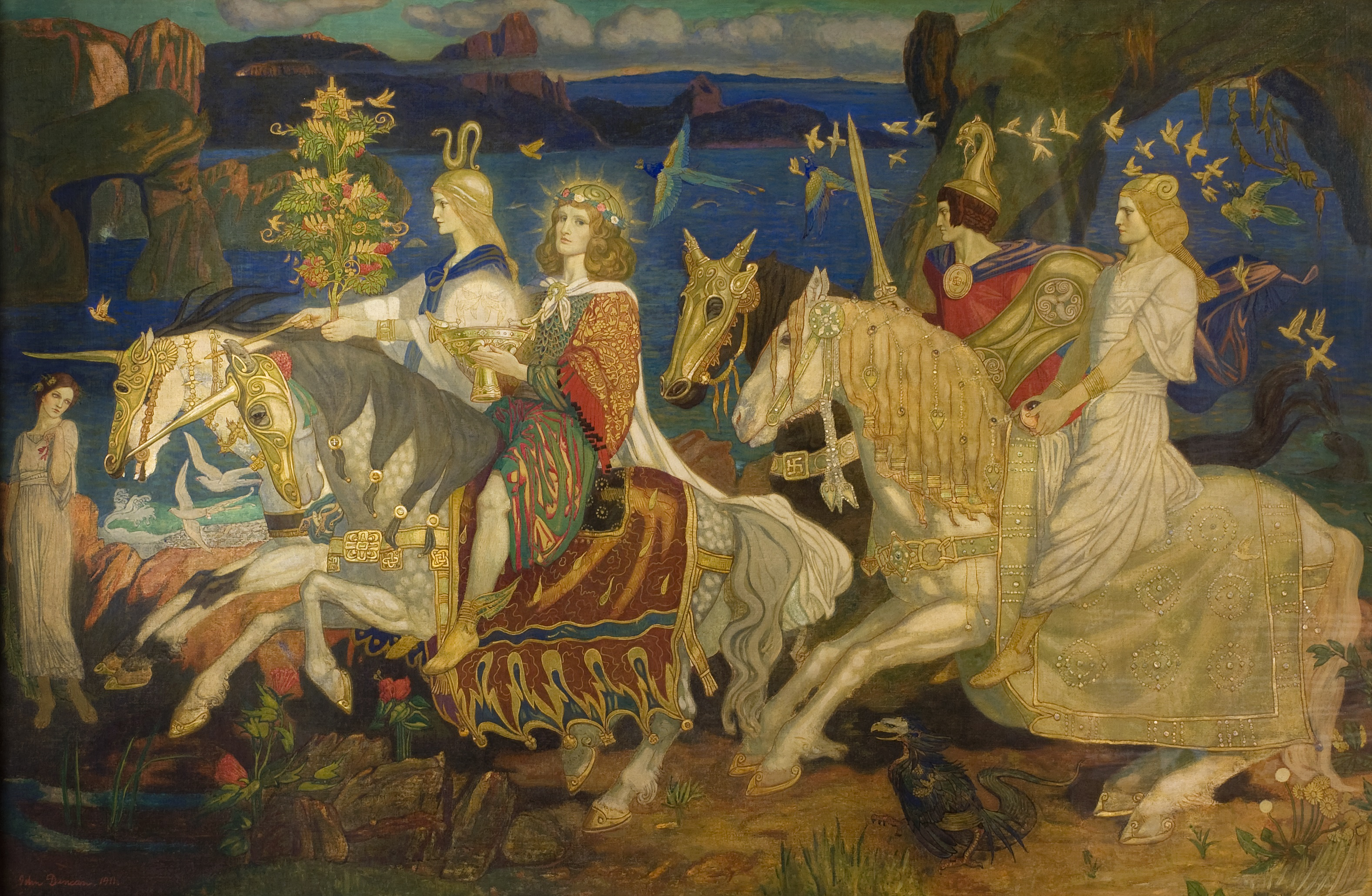
Jackson's Elves resemble those of the 19th-20th century Celtic Revival, as in John Duncan's 1911 painting The Riders of the Sidhe, rather than Tolkien's reconstruction of medieval Elves, according to Dimitra Fimi.

Fimi compared Jackson's handling of Elves with Tolkien's. Tolkien's Elves are rooted as firmly as possible in Anglo-Saxon, Middle English, and Norse tradition, but influenced also by Celtic fairies in the Tuatha Dé Danann. Jackson's Elves are however "Celtic" in the romanticised sense of the Celtic Revival. She compares Jackson's representation of Gildor Inglorion's party of Elves riding through the Shire "moving slowly and gracefully towards the West, accompanied by ethereal music" with John Duncan's 1911 painting The Riders of the Sidhe. She notes that Jackson's conceptual designer, the illustrator Alan Lee, had made use of the painting in the 1978 book Faeries.

== In popular culture ==
Tolkien-style Elves have influenced the depiction of elves in the fantasy genre from the 1960s and afterwards. Elves speaking an elvish language similar to those in Tolkien's novels became staple non-human characters in high fantasy works and in fantasy role-playing games like Dungeons & Dragons. They are often portrayed as being mentally sharp and lovers of nature, art, and song, as well as wiser and more beautiful than humans. They usually fit the stereotype of being skilled archers and gifted in magic.
