= Faeries (1981 film) =

- Directed by: Lee Mishkin
- Starring: Hans Conried; Craig Schaefer; Morgan Brittany; Frank Welker; Bob Arbogast; June Foray; Linda Gary; Mel Welles
- Music by: Bobby Bennett
- Country of origin: United States
- Original language: English

Production
- Editor: Peter Aries
- Running time: 25 minutes
- Production company: Tomorrow Entertainment

Original release
- Release: February 25, 1981

Faeries is a 1981 animated television special that appeared on CBS in the United States. It is based on the 1978 book Faeries, described and illustrated by Brian Froud and Alan Lee. The special was directed by Lee Mishkin with animation direction by Fred Hellmich, executive produced by Thomas W. Moore, Anne Upson and Jean Moore Edwards, and was designed by Alan Aldridge. The special first aired on CBS on February 25, 1981.

== Plot ==
A young man, Oisin (pronounced "O-sheen"), is returning home with a group of huntsmen from an unsuccessful hunt when a deer appears before him and reveals herself to be Niamh (pronounced "Nee-am" and "Nee’uv"), a faerie princess. She takes him to her father, the Faerie King, whose shadow has come to life and now threatens Faerie Land. The King begs Oisin to travel to Squalor Web Castle and defeat the evil Shadow.

Oisin and his faerie helper Puck travel to the castle, encountering hags, goblins, merrows and other faerie creatures. They also save a kobold from being eaten by evil trows. Eventually the three arrive at the lake, beyond which sits the castle. After meeting an Irish faerie who attempts to dissuade them from their mission, they arrive at the castle. Avoiding redcaps, the Shadow's evil soldiers, Oisin makes his way to the tallest tower, defeats the Shadow, and joins a celebration in Faerie Land before returning to his human companions.

== Cast ==
- Hans Conried as Faerie King / Shadow
- Craig Schaefer as Oisin
- Morgan Brittany as Princess Niamh
- Frank Welker as Puck / Fir Darrig / Trow #1 / Hunter #1
- Bob Arbogast as Kobold / Trow #2 / Hunter #2
- June Foray as Mally
- Linda Gary as Vilda
- Janet Waldo as Andria
- Mel Welles as Trow #3 / Hunter #3

== Home media and merchandising ==
Family Home Entertainment released the special on VHS and Betamax in the 1980s.

Henson Associates were the merchandising agents for Faeries.

== Award nominations ==
Faeries was nominated for four Primetime Emmy Awards in 1981:

- Outstanding Animated Program — Jean Moore Edwards, Fred Hellmich, Lee Mishkin, Thomas W. Moore, Anne E. Upson, Norton Virgien (executive producers)
- Outstanding Individual Achievement - Animated Programming — Alan Aldridge (teleplay), Lee Mishkin (teleplay), Christopher Gore (story)
- Outstanding Individual Achievement - Animated Programming — Peter Aries (film editor)
- Outstanding Individual Achievement - Animated Programming — Peter Aries (film sound editor)

== See also ==
- The Elm-Chanted Forest, 1986 film
- The Black Cauldron, 1985 film
