= Faeries (book) =

1978 book by Brian Froud and Alan Lee

- First edition
- Editor: David Larkin
- Authors: Brian Froud, Alan Lee
- Illustrators: Brian Froud, Alan Lee
- Language: English
- Genre: Fairy painting; fantasy art
- Publisher: Harry N. Abrams, Inc. (US 1978); Souvenir Press (UK 1978)
- Publication date: November 1978
- Publication place: United States; United Kingdom
- Media type: Print

Faeries is a book written and illustrated by English artists Brian Froud and Alan Lee. An illustrated compendium of faerie mythology, legends and folklore, the book explores the history, customs and habitat of faeries in the manner of a field guide, complete with hand annotations.

The book was first published in 1978 by Harry N. Abrams, Inc. in the United States and Souvenir Press in the United Kingdom. It reached number four on the New York Times Best Seller list. Faeries has since been translated into at least nine other languages, and in 1981 was adapted into an animated television special of the same name. As of 2003, the book had sold more than five million copies.

The book received a mixed critical reception from news sources and library trade publications. Reviewers praised the authors' illustrations and depth of research, while some criticized the book's writing style for not clearly specifying facts regarding the book's mythical subject matter.

== Overview ==
Spelled in the archaic fashion, the title faeries refers not just to fairies, but encompasses a wide range of mythological creatures including goblins, dwarves, pixies, elves, leprechauns, ogres, boggarts, banshees, mermaids and selkies.

The book's contents include information about faerie archaeology, history, characteristics and customs, a geography of Faerieland, and a catalogue of faerie types. It also gives in-universe advice on where faeries are most likely to be found, how to ward off faerie spells, when it is especially dangerous to come across faeries, and the ecology of faery-plant interactions. Although the book's historical information covers folklore from around the world, most of the facts, poetry and literature of faeries come from France, England, Scotland and Ireland. Included amongst Lee and Froud's text are Celtic legends and ballads about faeries, as well as excerpts from poems about faeries by poets such as William Butler Yeats and Christina Rossetti.

In total, the book contains 185 illustrations, 147 in full colour. It is published unpaginated.

== Development ==
The idea for the book came from New York publisher Ian Ballantine. Inspired by the success of the 1977 Dutch-authored book Gnomes, Ballentine recruited the two British illustrators Brian Froud and Alan Lee to produce a similar tome about fairies as a follow up to Gnomes (a third book, Giants, was published following Faeries).

Sharing lodging in Chagford on the edge of Dartmoor, Lee and Froud spent nine months researching, illustrating and writing the book. They referred to the work of leading British folklorist Katharine Briggs as one of their main sources for information about faeries. Other sources include 19th-century folklorists such as Robert Hunt's Popular Romances of the West of England (1865) and Lady Wilde's Ancient Legends of Ireland (1887), as well as stories from the Middle Ages such as those told by Gerald of Wales. According to Froud, Ballantine had "expected a fun, jolly book with fluffy faeries, and what he got were all these green horrible creatures with nasty teeth that bit your ankles, and he was horrified. But our research was based on folklore and on what faeries were really like."

Froud stated that while planning the book, he and Lee intended to make their artwork indistinguishable from the other's, and to "actually draw on top of each other's art." Due to time constraints, however, they were unable to do it in such a way. Instead, they each chose what they wanted to illustrate and divided the work between them, taking into account one another's artistic strengths and weaknesses. Froud said, "We also made sure there were a few images that were absolutely a crossover, so I was partly in his style and he was partly in my style."

== Style ==
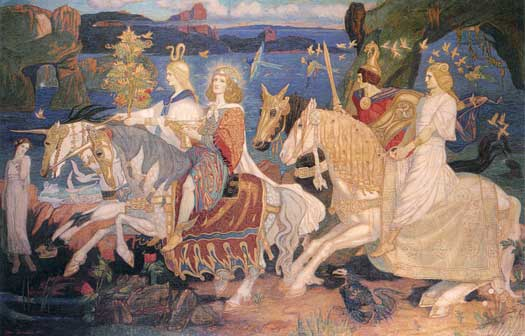
Lee's illustration for the entry "Faerie Rades" was inspired by John Duncan's 1911 painting The Riders of the Sidhe (above), according to Dimitra Fimi.

Faeries features watercolours and pencil drawings. Comparing the two authors' illustrative styles, writer James Clarke remarked that Lee's images "skew slightly more towards a sense of realism" while Froud's style "is slightly more heightened and his fairy faces are immediately identifiable." Writing for Library Journal, M. L. del Mastro described the illustrations as a mix of "Maxfield Parrish delicates with Disney/Hildebrandt grotesques." The Washington Post identified the book's "stylistic debts" as being to Arthur Rackham, Richard Dadd, Willy Pogany, and the pre-Raphaelite painters John William Waterhouse, John Everett Millais and Edward Burne-Jones. The Atlantic Monthly also likened the illustrative style to the painters Arnold Böcklin and Hieronymus Bosch. Fantasy literature scholar Dimitra Fimi wrote that Lee's illustration for the entry "Faerie Rades", depicting the procession of the Irish fairies as "splendidly dressed men and women in medieval style, most of them riding decorated horses and one of them holding an unfolding banner," took a strong influence from John Duncan's 1911 painting The Riders of the Sidhe.

== Publication and reception ==
Faeries was first published by Harry N. Abrams, Inc. in November 1978. The book reached number four on the New York Times Best Seller list. By January 1979, it had sold out its first printing of 180,000 copies.

Considered a fantasy classic, Faeries had sold in excess of five million copies by 2003. A 25th-anniversary edition of Faeries was published in 2002, containing eight new pages and 20 new pieces of art by Froud and Lee, as well as new introductions by the artists. The anniversary edition sold more than 100,000 copies within six months of release. The "Deluxe Collector's Edition" published in 2010 includes an additional eight new pieces of art by Froud and Lee as well as essays by the artists and a foreword by Jane Yolen.

=== Critical response ===
The New York Times Book Review wrote that Faeries, as Gnomes did, "rescued the little people from their roles as stereotyped characters in children's books". Describing the book as a "Baedeker of Faerieland", Stephen Hunter of The Baltimore Sun wrote, "What Froud and Lee have done is to explore the arcana of English, Celtic and Welsh folklore, but to reinterpret in wholly a revisionist way, without sentimentality, without cuteness: Gnomes with fangs. The style is soft and evocative, the colours pale, suggesting the dreamed, the felt, rather than the observed." A review in The Atlantic Monthly praised Faeries as a "pretty book" with "lavish, colorful illustrations", but found its text lacked the "sly satire that distinguished Gnomes."

New York Times reviewer Helen Bevington praised the tales as "fascinating" and illustrations as "both beautiful and grotesque", but held the criticism that the text did not clearly distinguish fact from fancy. This criticism was shared by M. L. del Mastro in Library Journal, who wrote that although "curious lore and visual appeal make the book a nice portfolio", "Faeries suffers from three defects. The text follow no discernable plan. The authors have neglected to establish a point of view: jumbling the scholar's "it is believed" with the believer's "it is" and the satirist's implied "it ought to be" they have not taken their subject seriously, and have left fairies neither mythic, magic, nor figmentary".

=== Award nominations ===
Faeries won second place in the 1979 Locus Award for Best Art Book and was nominated for the 1979 Balrog Award for Best Professional Publication.

== Release history ==
Country	Release date	Edition (hardback/paperback)	Publisher	Pages	ISBN
United States	November 1978	Hardback	Harry N. Abrams, Inc.	208	ISBN 978-0-8109-0901-4
United States	31 December 1978	Paperback	Bantam Books	192	ISBN 978-0-553-01159-3
United States	1 April 1995	Hardback (reprint)	Abrams	208	ISBN 978-0-8109-0901-4
United States	18 November 2002	Hardback (anniversary edition)	Abrams	216	ISBN 978-0-8109-3274-6
United States	10 October 2010	Hardback (deluxe collector's edition)	Abrams	208	ISBN 978-0-8109-9586-4
United Kingdom	9 November 1978	Hardback	Souvenir Press	188	ISBN 978-0-285-62359-0
United Kingdom	12 October 1979	Paperback (new edition)	Pan Books	208	ISBN 978-0-330-25756-5
United Kingdom	11 November 2002	Paperback (anniversary edition)	Pavilion Books	216	ISBN 978-1-86205-558-2
Australia	31 December 1978	Paperback	Books for Pleasure	208	ISBN 978-0-7296-0104-7
Australia	1978	Hardback	Books for Pleasure	208	ISBN 978-0-7296-0104-8

=== Other language editions ===
- German
  - Das große Buch der Geister von Elfen, Nixen, Gnomen, Irrwischen und anderen geheimnisvollen Wesen (The Great Book of Spirits of Elves, Nymphs, Gnomes, Wisps and Other Mysterious Beings) (1979 hardcover) by Oldenburg: Stalling, ISBN 978-3-7979-1677-8
  - Von Elfen, Goblins, Spukgestalten: Ein Handbuch der anderen Welt, nach alten Quellen erschlossen und aufgezeichnet (Of Elves, Goblins, Ghostly Figures: A Handbook of the Other World, developed and recorded from ancient sources) (1996 hardcover) by Hildesheim: Gebrüder, ISBN 978-3-8067-2895-8
- Dutch — De elfen (1979 hardcover) by Bussum: Van Holkema & Warendorf, ISBN 978-90-269-4809-1
- French — Les Fées (1979 hardcover) by Paris: Albin Michel ISBN 978-2-226-00846-6
- Japanese — Japanese: フェアリー /, romanized: Fearī (1980) by Tōkyō: Sanrio OCLC 673886269
- Serbo-Croatian — Vile i vilenjaci (1980 hardcover) by Beograd: Jugoslavija; Rijeka: Otokar Keršovani OCLC 439164170
- Spanish — Hadas (1985 paperback) by Madrid: Ediciones Montena ISBN 978-84-7515-329-2
- Italian — Fate (1987 hardcover) by Milan: Rizzoli, ISBN 978-88-17-64104-3
- Portuguese — Fadas by (1992 paperback) by São Paulo: Siciliano ISBN 978-85-267-0504-3
- Greek — Greek: Νεράιδες, romanized: Neráides (2009 paperback) by Greek: Φανταστικός Κόσμος, romanized: Fantastikós Kósmos ISBN 978-960-6868-09-2

=== Pop-up version ===
In 1980, a 12-page pop-up version for children was published as The Faeries Pop-up Book by Abrams in the U.S. and Kestral Books in the U.K.

== Adaptations and follow-ups ==
Faeries was the basis of a 1981 animated special of the same name directed by Lee Mishkin that appeared on CBS in the United States. Henson Associates were the merchandising agents for Faeries.

Froud followed Faeries with several art books, including Good Faeries/Bad Faeries (1998) and Brian Froud's Faeries' Tales (2014).

== See also ==
- Fairy painting
