= Castles (book) =

1984 book by David Day, David Larkin and Alan Lee

Castles is a book by David Day, David Larkin, and Alan Lee published in 1984.

== Contents ==
Castles is a book which details castles from history, myth, and fantasy with narrative text written by David Day and drawings and paintings by Alan Lee.

== Reception ==
John Nubbin reviewed Castles for Different Worlds magazine and stated that "A project which took three years to complete, it is a breathtaking collection of Lee's finest work. The legends within are told in a classic, fantasy manner. Day's text is warm and flowing, always moving at just the correct pace. And, hardly any more can be said of Lee's work. It is as dynamic, as vibrant, as anyone could hope for. The fact that the book was printed in Italy, using the Pizzi Offset Company's special five-color press, only makes it more of a wonder in this age of shoddy, second-hand bookmaking. It is almost as if Bantam set out to make a book as beautiful and yet long-lasting as its subject matter."

Dave Langford reviewed Castles for White Dwarf #60, and stated that "Castles is constrained by subject matter: a castle is a castle, and despite Lee's evident skill – especially at far-off vistas – there are only so many changes to be rung."

== Reviews ==
- Review by Fritz Leiber (1984) in Locus, #285 October 1984
- Review by Debbie Notkin (1984) in Locus, #286 November 1984
- Review by Don D'Ammassa (1985) in Science Fiction Chronicle, #64 January 1985
- Review by Algis Budrys (1985) in The Magazine of Fantasy & Science Fiction, February 1985
- Review by Brian Stableford (1985) in Fantasy Review, February 1985
- Review by Patrick L. Price and Roger Raupp (1985) in Amazing Stories, March 1985
- Review by Tom Easton (1985) in Analog Science Fiction/Science Fact, May 1985
- Review by Barbara Davies (1986) in Vector 130
