= The Taking of Excalibur =

1897 oil painting by John Duncan

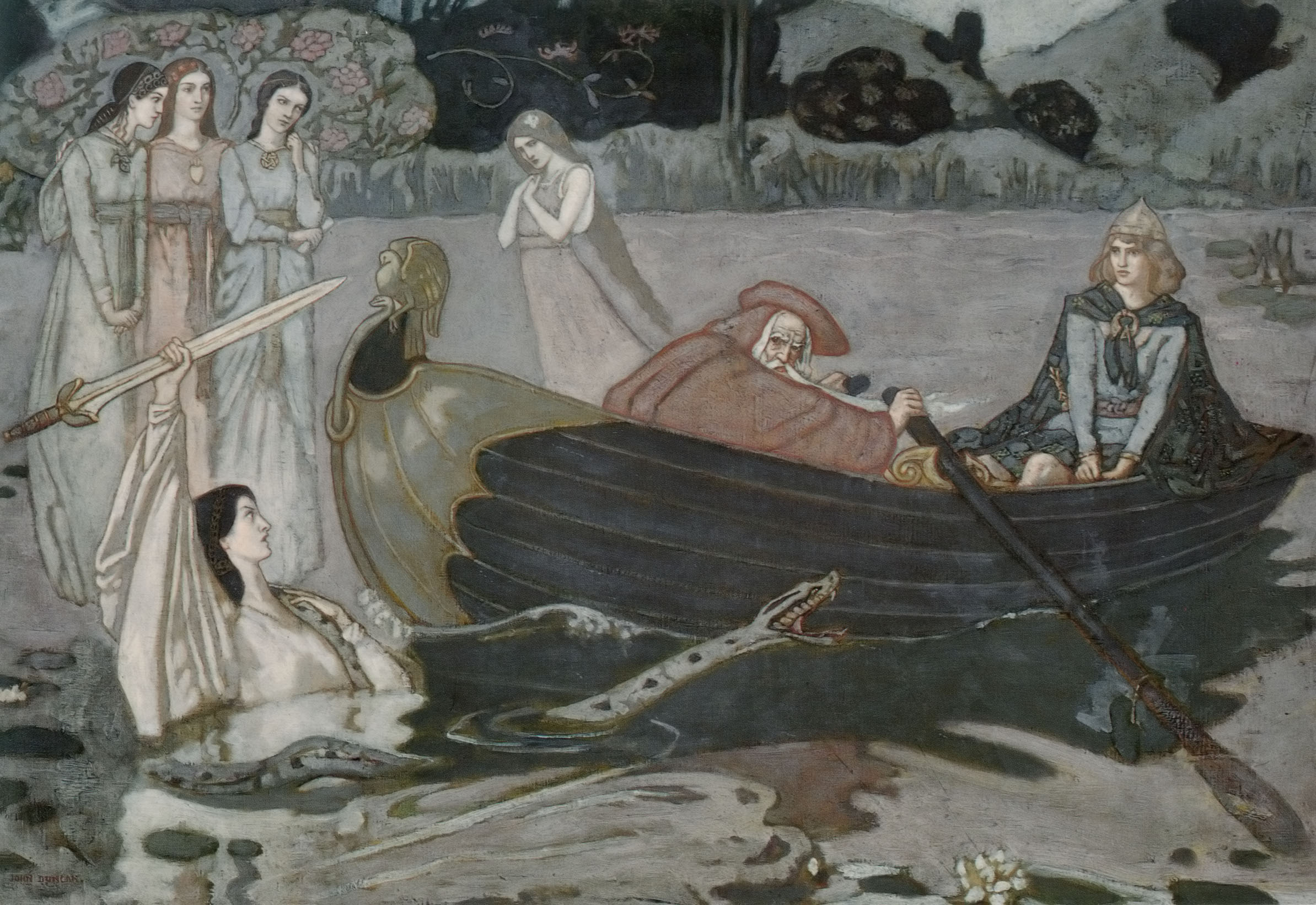
- Artist: John Duncan
- Year: 1897
- Medium: Oil on canvas
- Dimensions: 63.5 x 91.8 cm
- Location: City Art Centre, Edinburgh

The Taking of Excalibur is an oil painting by John Duncan in 1897. It is currently placed at the City Art Centre, Edinburgh. This Dundee-born, Symbolist painter was known for his work on Arthurian Legends, Celtic folklore and various other mythological subjects.

== About ==
This painting evokes the legend of Arthur's Seat. Deep under the volcanic rock, two enormous dragons were said to reside. The King attempted in vain to construct massive fortresses on the land, but being the last in Scotland, the dragons fought underground every night. A huge battle between the serpent giants began when the King ordered the hill to be uncovered. They collided as they spiralled through the air, falling back into the seat's depths. This vision of Duncan draws on his Celtic heritage.

This scene is significant because Excalibur is the legendary sword of King Arthur, which he used to defeat his enemies and establish his reign as the rightful King of Camelot. The sword is said to have magical properties and was given to Arthur by the Lady of the Lake. The emergence of the Red Dragon and its transformation into Excalibur symbolizes the mystical and supernatural elements of the Arthurian legend.

Arthur Thomson, in his Interpretation of the Paintings in the Lounge of Ramsay Lodge, said:

"Merlin, calling to those who had come to see this wonder, said

that on the morrow the red dragon would rise from the loch

below (now Duddingston) in the form of a sword, and to him

who had the hardihood to grasp it, the sword would be yielded".

This is one of six Mural studies created in 1897 for the Ramsay Garden (Murals of Ramsay Gardens) on Castlehill's Student Common Room. Patrick Geddes, the town planner and sociologist, redeveloped the Ramsay Lodge of Allan Ramsay along with the architect Sydney Mitchell. Geddes and Duncan, who are dedicated to a Celtic Revival in the arts, created a grand mural plan to honour Scotland's historical contributions to the arts, literature, and sciences.

Alfred, Lord Tennyson, in his Idylls of the King: The Passing of Arthur, wrote:

"Thou therefore take my brand Excalibur,

Which was my pride: for thou rememberest how

In those old days, one summer noon, an arm

Rose up from out the bosom of the lake,

Clothed in white samite, mystic, wonderful,

Holding the sword—and how I row'd across

And took it, and have worn it, like a king;

And, wheresoever I am sung or told

In aftertime, this also shall be known:

But now delay not: take Excalibur,

And fling him far into the middle mere:

Watch what thou seëst, and lightly bring me word."

== Description ==
In this scene, the Red Dragon emerges from the nearby Duddingston Loch, transforming itself into the legendary sword Excalibur. Merlin, the wizard, can be seen rowing the boat while Morgan Le Fay presents the sword to Arthur. This painting shows the artist's unique flat and decorative style inspired from the Pre-Raphaelite Brotherhood movement, Early Renaissance frescoes and the Symbolist movement.
