= Black Ships Before Troy =

Children's novel

Black Ships Before Troy: The Story of the Iliad
- Front cover of first edition
- Author: Rosemary Sutcliff
- Illustrator: Alan Lee
- Language: English
- Genre: Children's novel, supernatural fiction, Greek mythology
- Publisher: Frances Lincoln
- Publication date: 1993
- Publication place: United Kingdom
- Media type: Print (hardcover)
- Pages: 128 pp
- ISBN: 978-0-7112-0778-3
- OCLC: 59341355
- Dewey Decimal: 883/.01
- LC Class: BL793.T7 S88 1993
- Followed by: The Wanderings of Odysseus

Black Ships Before Troy: The Story of the Iliad is a novel for children written by Rosemary Sutcliff, illustrated by Alan Lee, and published (posthumously) by Frances Lincoln in 1993. Partly based on the Iliad, the book retells the story of the Trojan War, from the birth of Paris to the building of the Trojan Horse. For his part Lee won the annual Kate Greenaway Medal from the Library Association, recognizing the year's best children's book illustration by a British subject.

== Reviews and reprints ==
Kirkus Reviews noted the "compelling vision and sensitivity to language, history, and heroics" that she brought to retelling both Arthurian legends and the Homeric epic. The Reading Teacher remarked that the book's division into 19 chapters makes it a good text to spread out over multiple readings, and praised Sutcliff's "graceful, powerful language". Sutcliff's prose is praised also in Books to Build On, a collection of teaching resources edited by E. D. Hirsch, Jr. A Common Core handbook suggests it for grades 6–8.

Delacorte Press reprinted Black Ships in the US within the calendar year (October 1993; ISBN 978-0-385-31069-7).

== Sequel ==
Sutcliff's retelling of Homer's Odyssey story was also illustrated by Alan Lee and published by Frances Lincoln in a companion edition, The Wanderings of Odysseus: The story of the Odyssey (1995, ISBN 978-0-7112-0862-9).

Kirkus praised both Sutcliff's text, for preserving "a certain formality of language" and for graceful "winnowing", and Lee's "spectacular paintings": "Beautiful and detailed ... the pictures are obviously the result of careful research and reward close scrutiny. A gorgeous book, more than worthy of its predecessor." It suggested the book for ages 10 and up.
