= The Riders of the Sidhe =

Painting by John Duncan

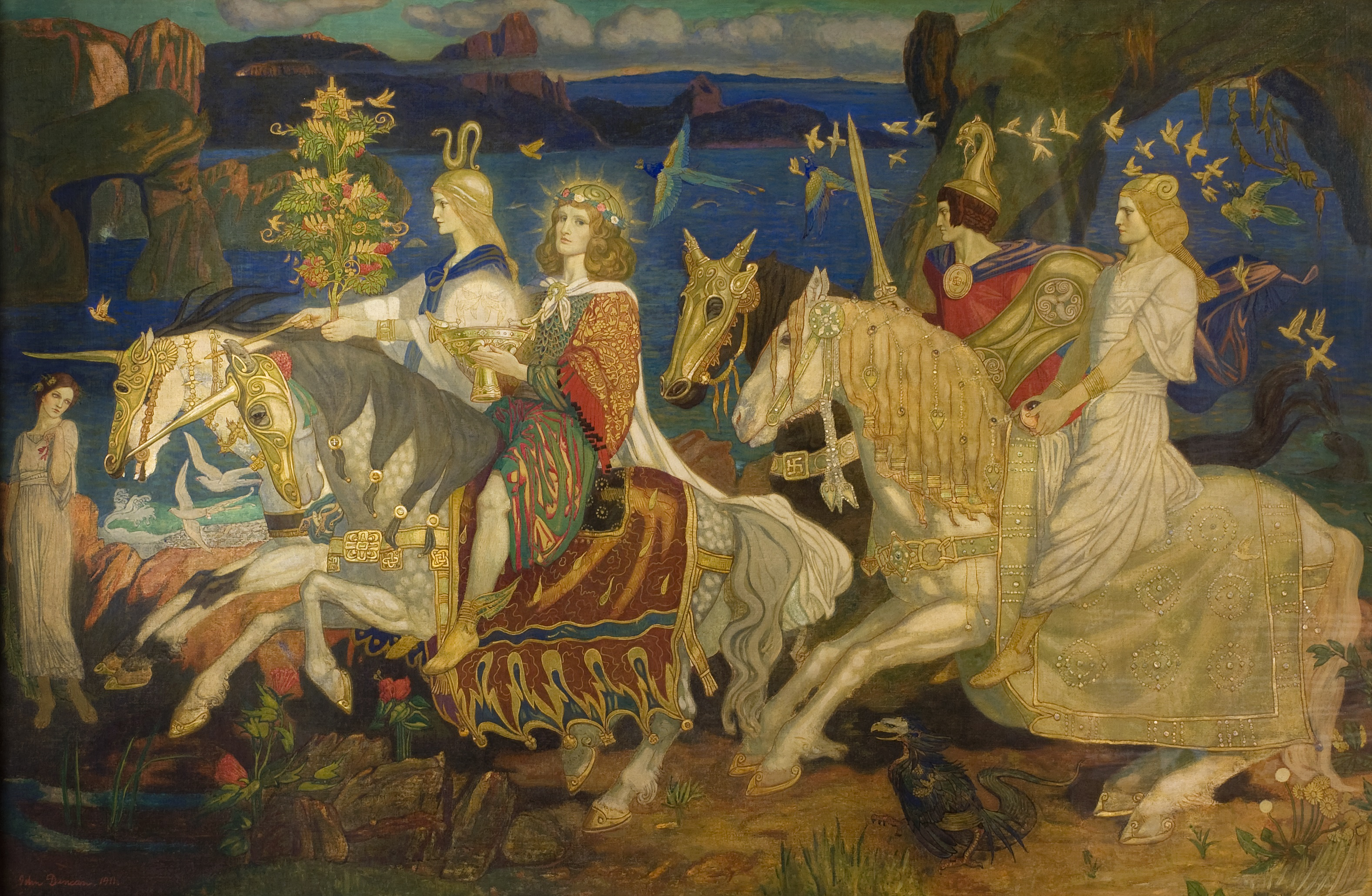
The Tuatha Dé Danann painted in "The Riders of the Sidhe" by John Duncan in 1911

The Riders of the Sidhe is a 1911 painting by John Duncan.

In Celtic mythology, the Sidhe are faerie people. They are depicted in procession, riding horses during the festival of Beltane. From left to right: the Tree of Life is a symbol of wisdom; the Grail, symbol of love; the sword, strength and power; and the stone (or crystal) of calm, hope, as it represents the past and the future.. John Duncan painted this artwork in 1911.

John Duncan managed to combine numerous references to create a modern portrait of an ancient civilization. The sword resembles Bronze Age models — he studied images from museum collections. The shield is inspired by the Battersea shield in the British Museum. His horse’s mask is based on the Iron Age Torrs horse helmet, held in the National Museum of Scotland. The painting also reflects Duncan’s study of Italian Renaissance artists, and he identified the influence of drapery in Edward Burne-Jones’ painting King Cophetua and the Beggar Maid.

In The Riders of the Sidhe, he worked in tempera over oils, an egg-based medium.

The painting is in the Dundee Art Galleries and Museums.
