= John Duncan (painter) =

Scottish painter (1866–1945)

- Born: 19 July 1866; Hilltown, Dundee, Scotland
- Died: 1945 (aged 78–79)
- Occupations: Portraitist, commercial illustrator, painter
- Known for: Symbolist paintings featuring legendary, folkloric, and mythological subjects
- Notable work: The Taking of Excalibur
- Movement: Celtic Revival

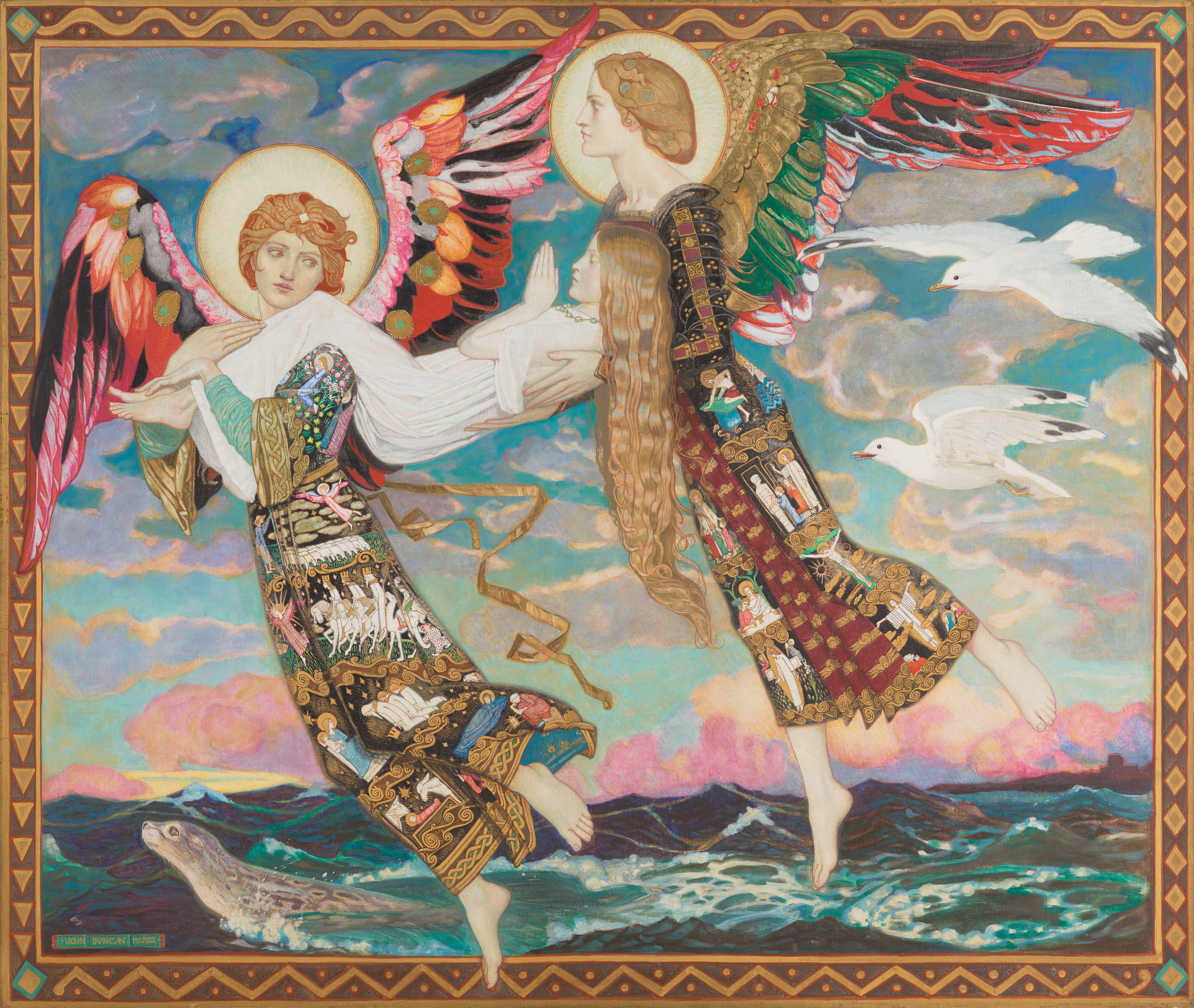
Saint Bride (1913)

John Duncan (1866–1945) was a Scottish Symbolist painter. Much of his work, apart from portraits, depicted Arthurian legends, Celtic folklore, and other mythological subjects.

== Biography ==
Duncan was born in the Hilltown area of Dundee on 19 July 1866, the son of a butcher and cattleman. He, however, had no interest in the family business and preferred the visual arts. By the age of 15 he was submitting cartoons to the local magazine The Wizard of the North and was later taken on as an assistant in the art department of the Dundee Advertiser. At the same time he was also a student at the Dundee School of Art, then based at the High School of Dundee. In 1887–1888 he worked in London as a commercial illustrator, then travelled to the continent to study at Antwerp Academy under Charles Verlat and the Düsseldorf Art Academy.

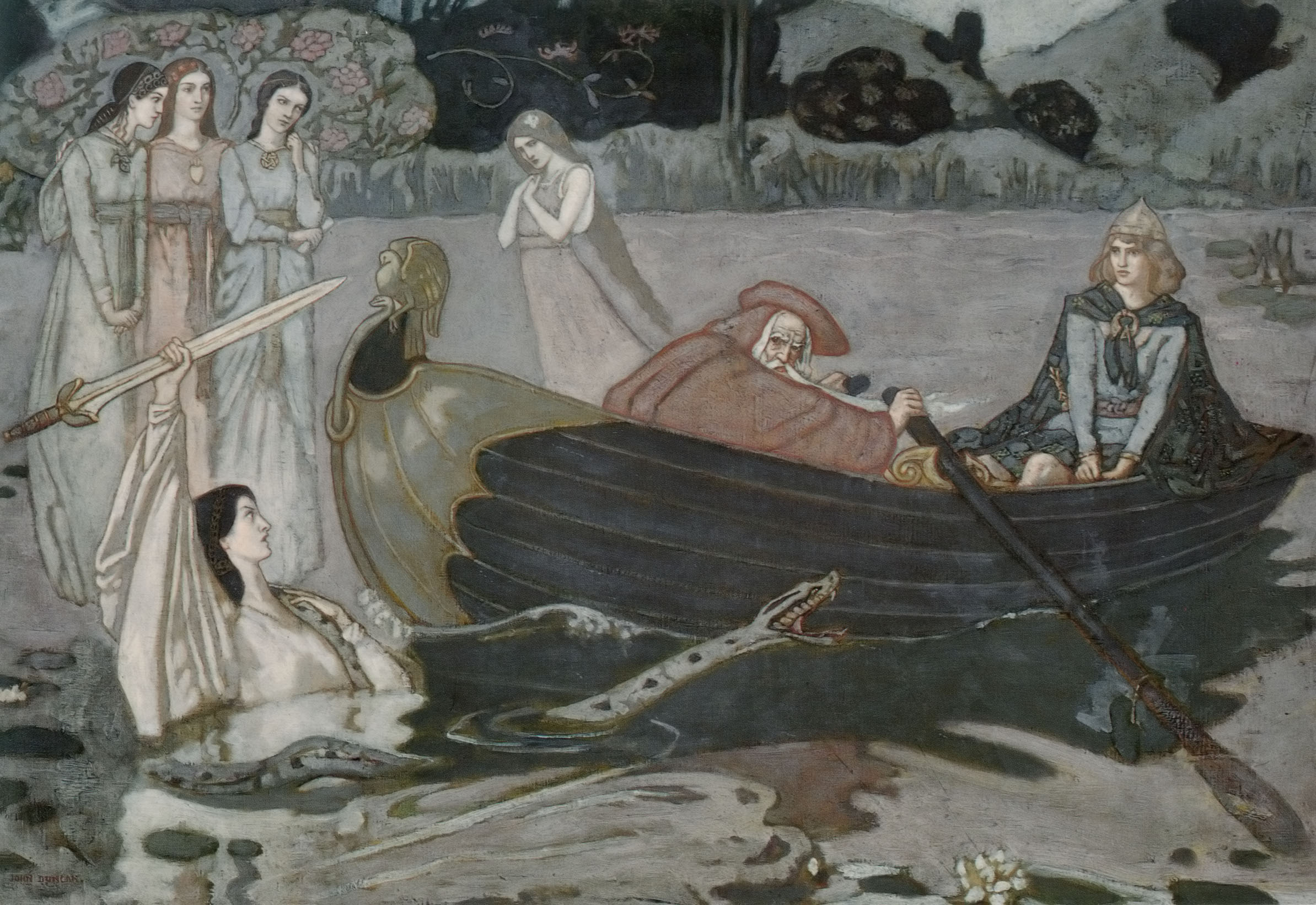
The Taking of Excalibur, 1897

In 1889 Duncan returned to Dundee and exhibited in the new Victoria Art Galleries extension of the Albert Institute. The following year he became one of the founder members of the Dundee Graphic Arts Association (now Dundee Art Society). Most of his income at this time was derived from portrait commissions, including the jute merchant John L. Luke and Mrs Hunter of Hilton.

In 1892 Duncan moved to Edinburgh to work with the sociologist, botanist and urbanist Patrick Geddes, whom he had met in Dundee. As part of the Celtic Revival movement, Duncan painted murals for Geddes's halls of residence at Ramsay Garden. He also became the principal artist for Geddes's 1895–1897 seasonal magazine The Evergreen. The magazine also featured work by the Dundee artist Nell Baxter and the decorative artist Robert Burns. Among other subjects, Duncan depicted Bacchus and Silenus in a mythical scene. Duncan also acted as director of Geddes's short-lived Old Edinburgh School of Art, and was commissioned by him to design the Witches' Well in Edinburgh in 1894.

In 1897 Duncan returned to Dundee and exhibited Celtic and Symbolist paintings at the Graphic Arts Association as well as the Royal Scottish Academy and the Royal Glasgow Institute among others. It was at this time that he painted The Glaive of Light now in the University of Dundee's collection. He continued to teach art and design, at the Dundee YMCA, the University and the art school at Dundee Technical Institute. He also created Dundee's first design collective by gathering together a group of young talents who created and exhibited decorative art and design pieces for the Graphic Arts Association, including Nell Baxter, Rosa Baxter, Elizabeth Burt and Duncan's sister Jessie Westbrook.

Thanks to Patrick Geddes's influence, in 1900 Duncan was appointed as a Professor at the Chicago Institute founded by Francis Wayland Parker. His stay there was not a happy one, and after Parker's death in 1902 he returned to Scotland and settled in Edinburgh, where he would live for the rest of his life.

Duncan was a member of the Scottish Arts Club and served as its President.

His last major work was entitled Mary Queen of Scots at Fotheringhay (dated 1929). The work was commissioned and is now held by the University of St Andrews. The painting was completed in spite of the critical antagonisms Duncan was facing at the time. A smaller scale replica is held in the Tullie House Museum and Art Gallery, Carlisle.

== Gallery ==
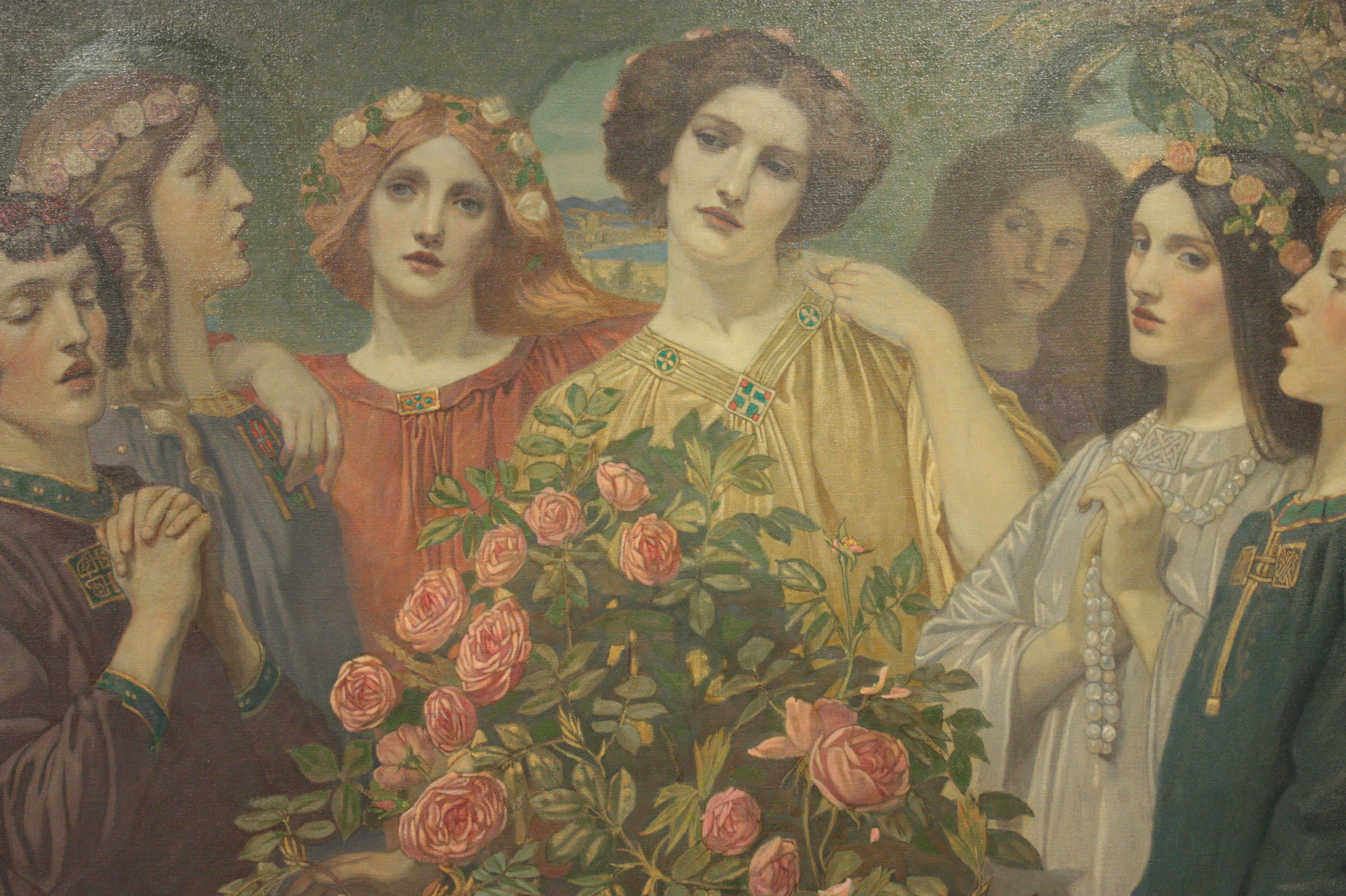
Detail from Hymn to the Rose (1907)

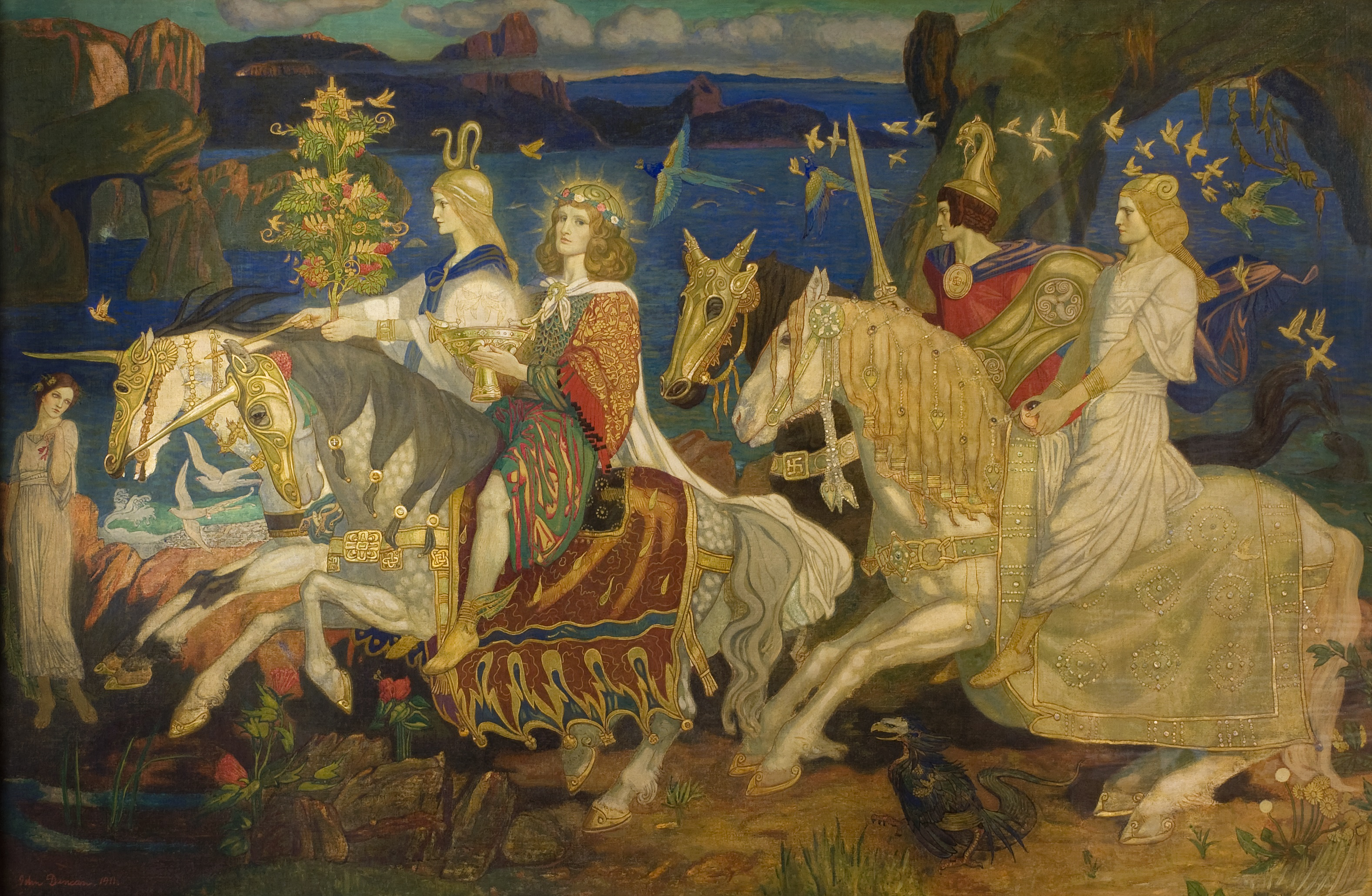
Riders of the Sidhe (1911)

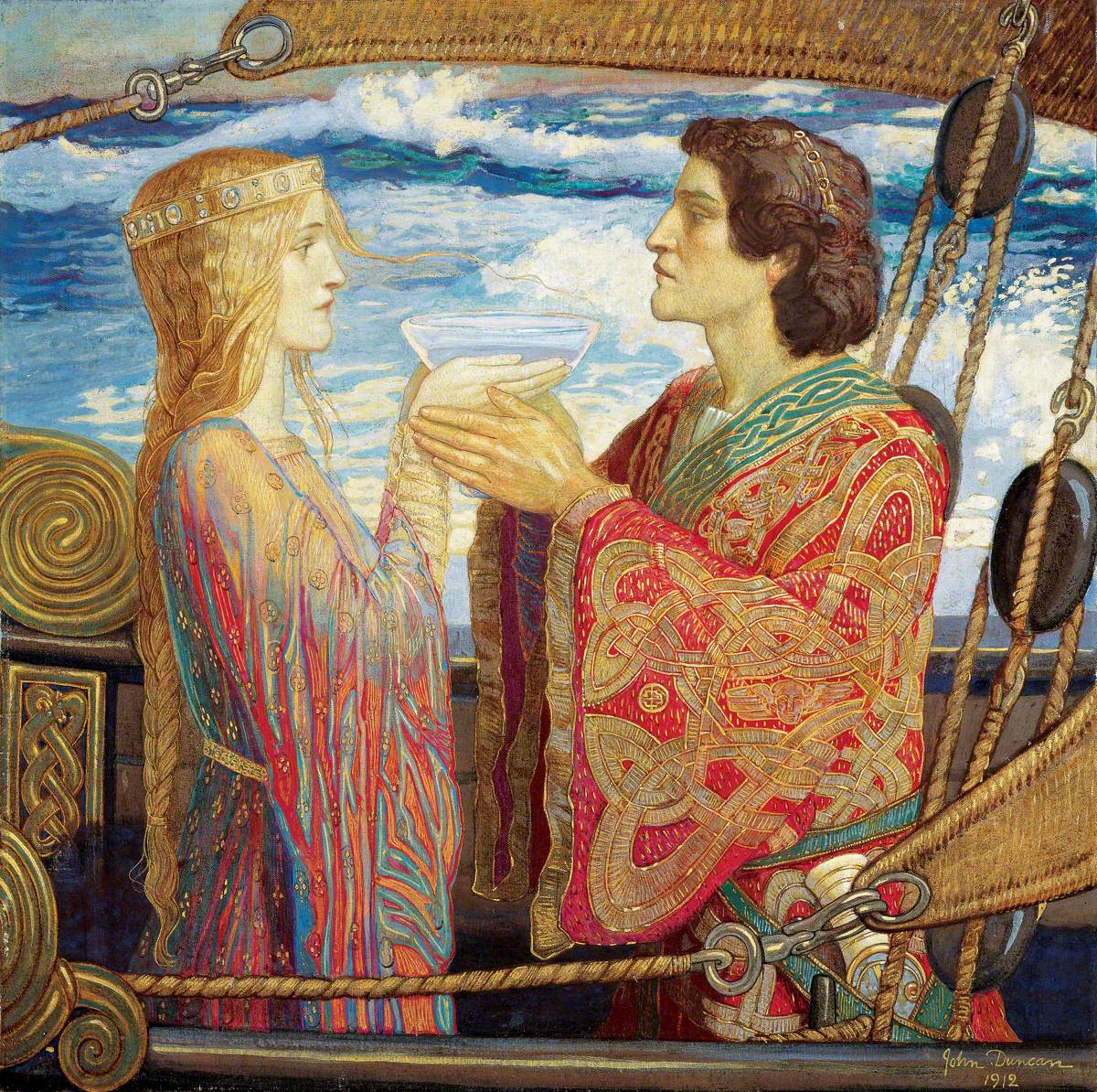
Tristan and Isolde (1912)

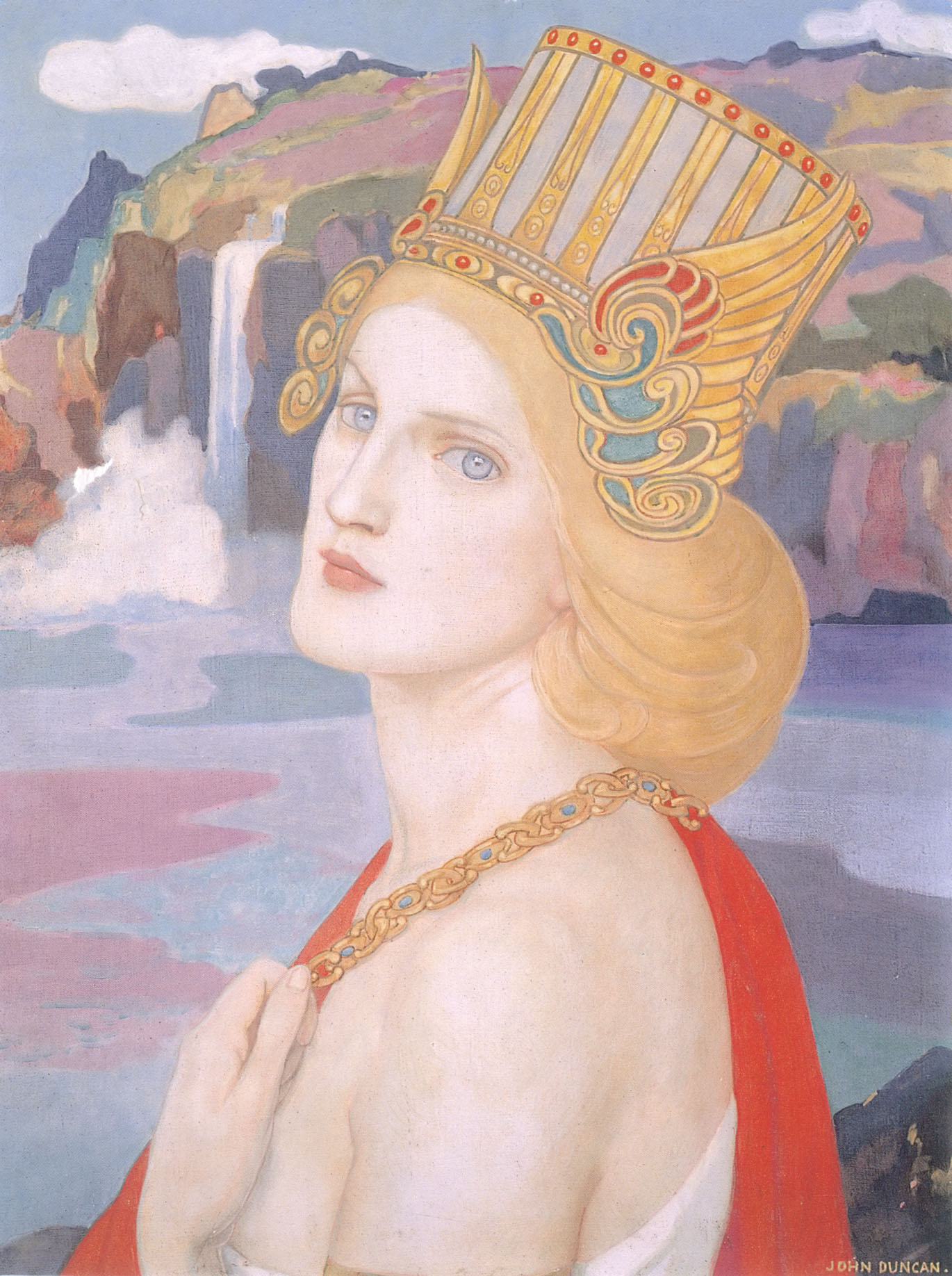
Aoife (c. 1914)

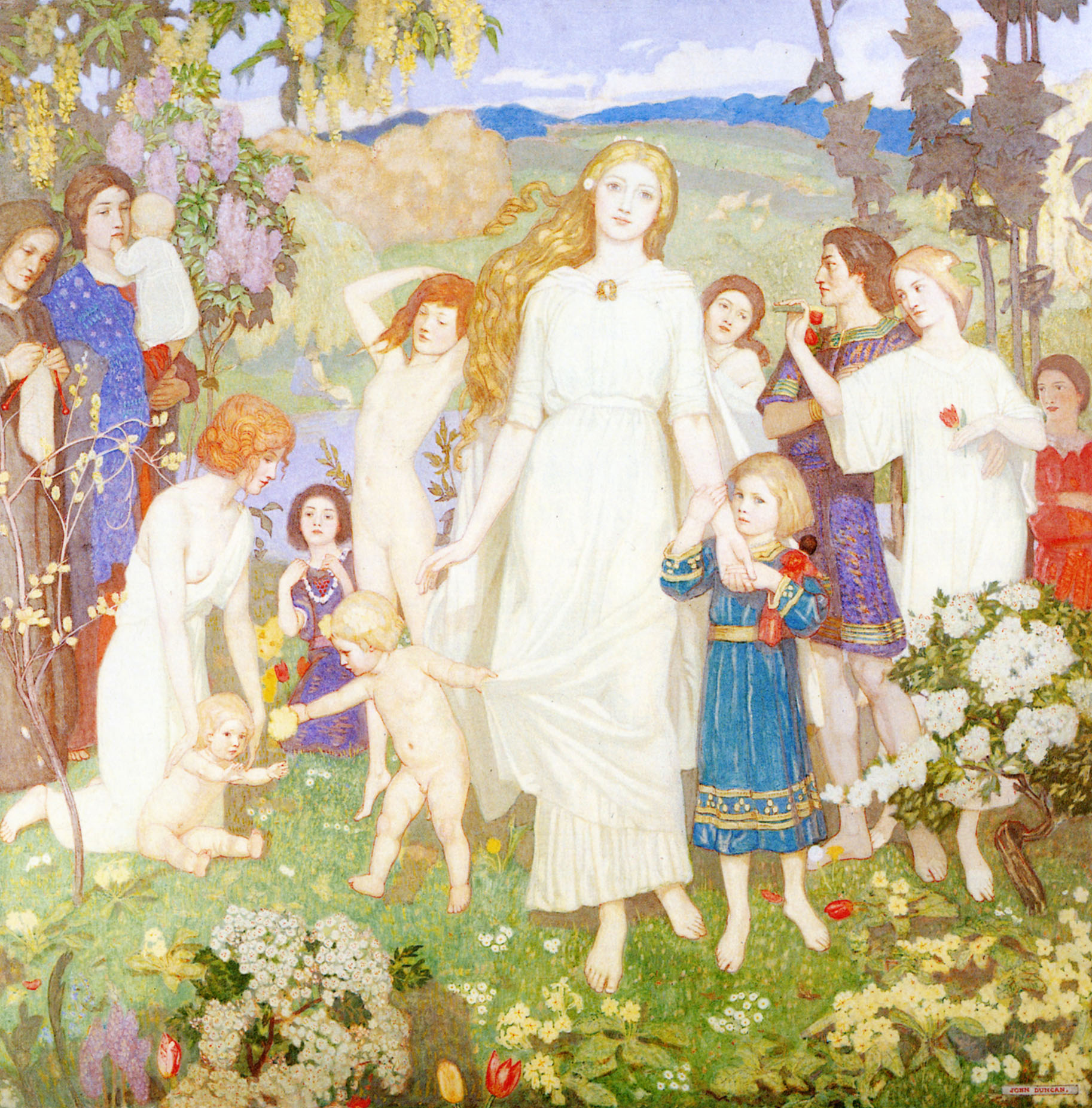
The Coming of Bride (1917)

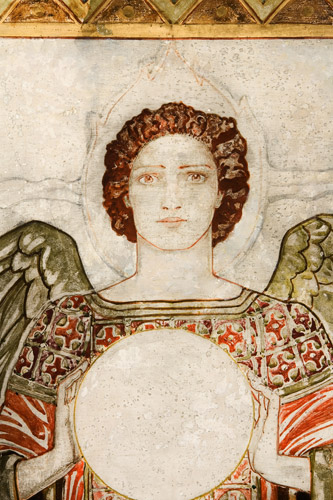
Archangel Uriel (c. 1919)

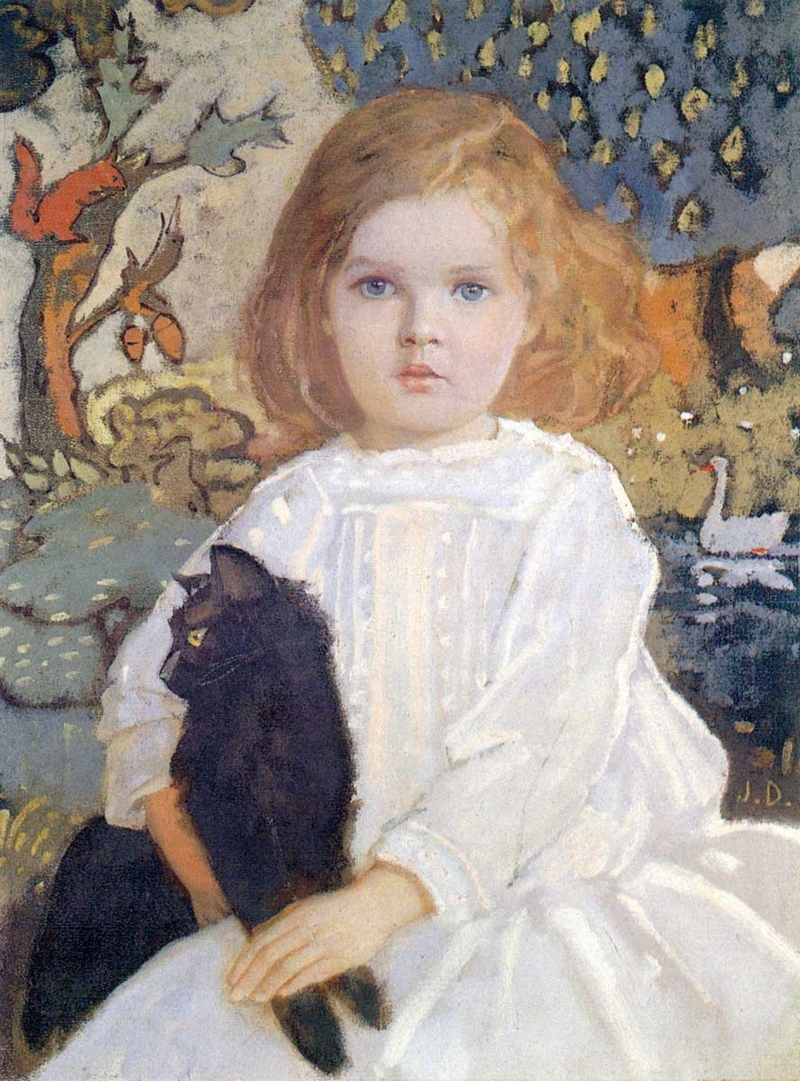
Portrait of the artist's daughter, Vivian (1920)

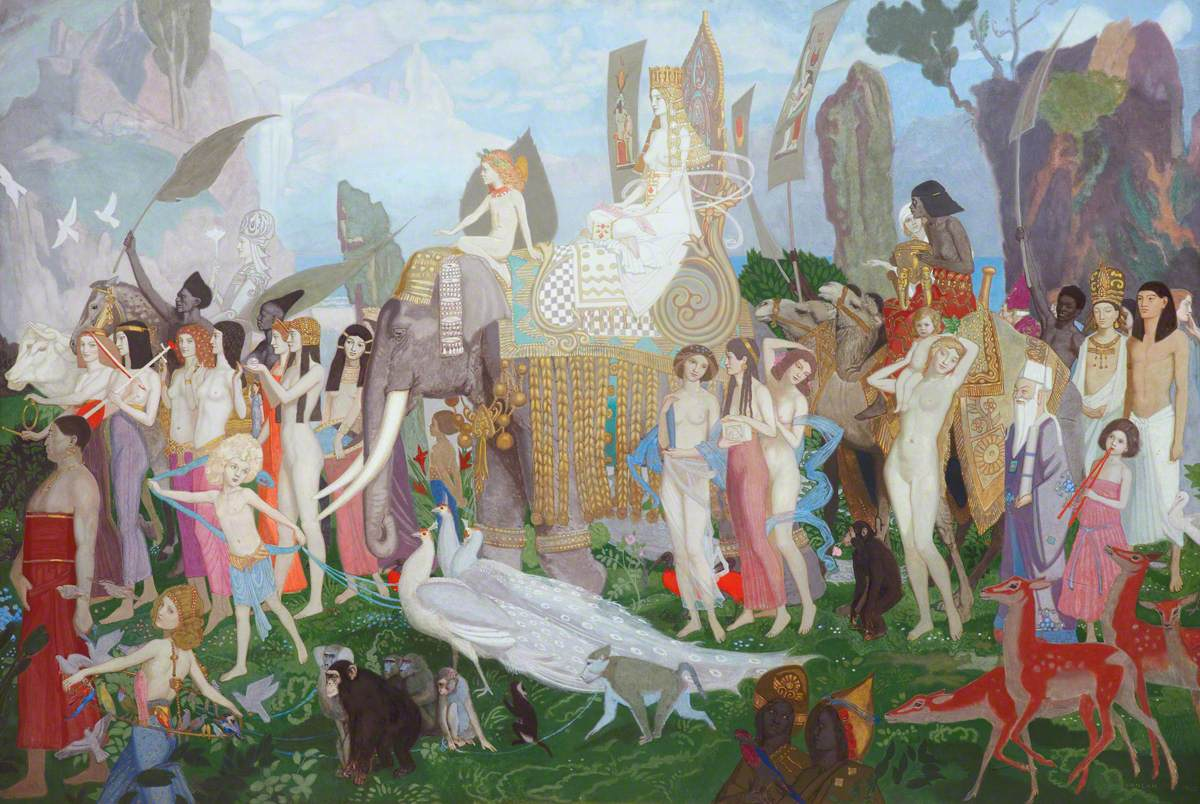
Ivory, Apes and Peacocks (1923)

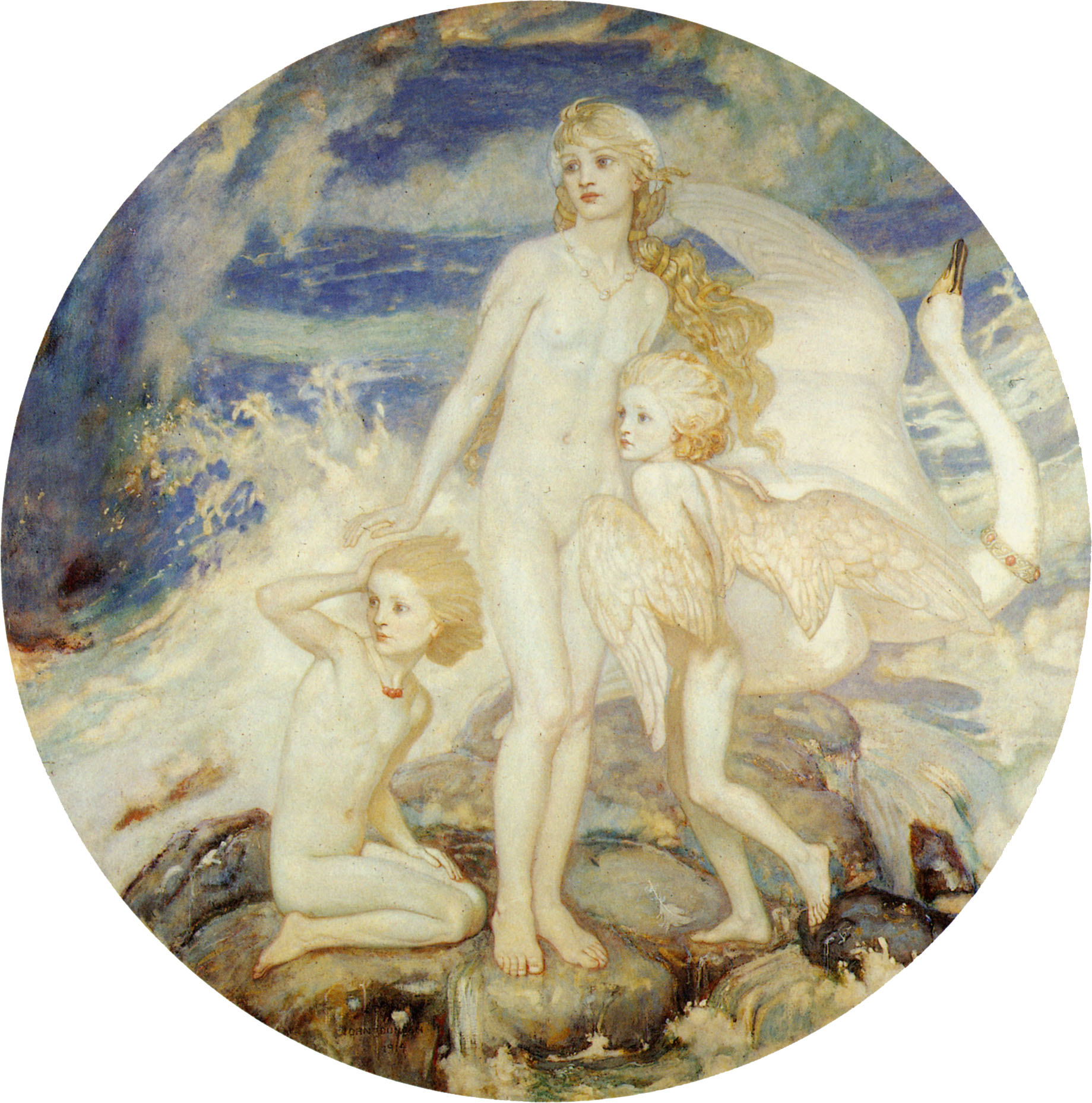
The Children of Lir (1924)

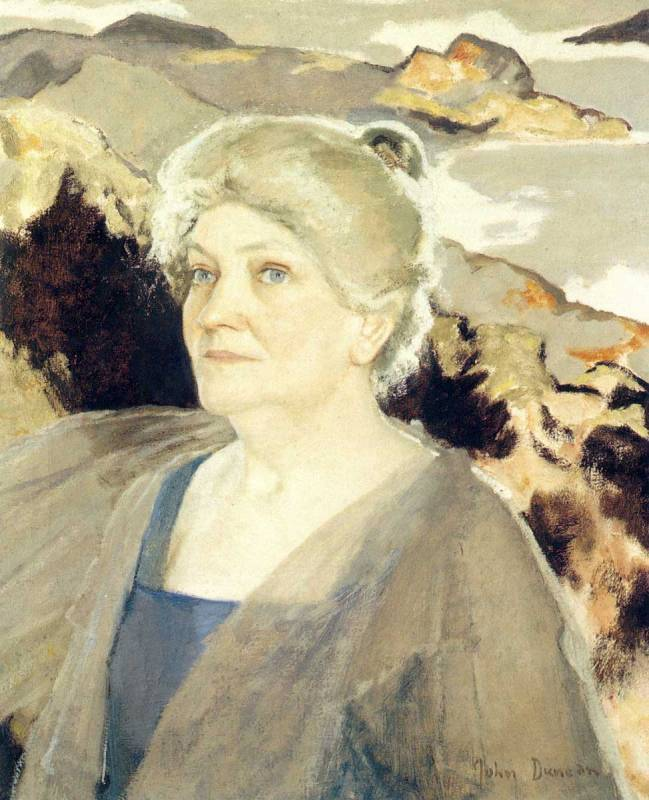
Portrait of Marjory Kennedy (1931)

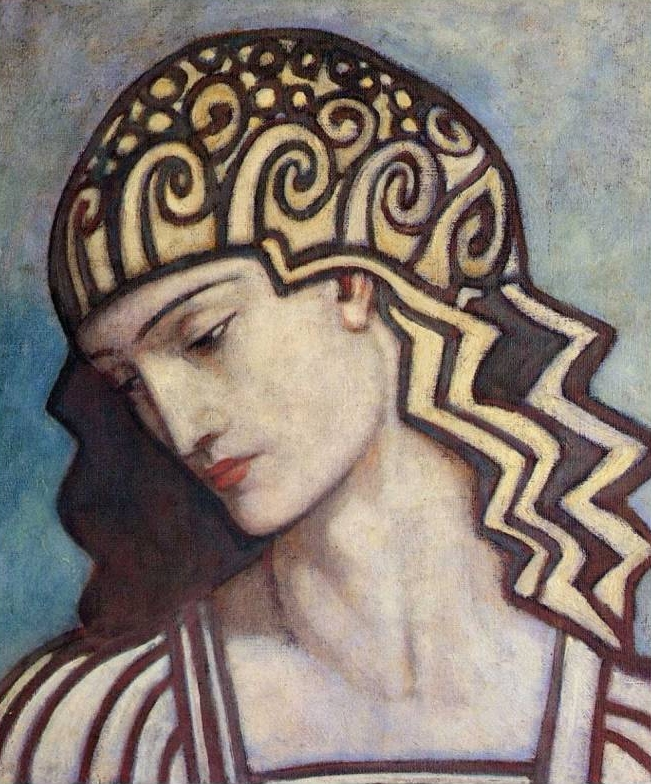
Head of a Goddess
