= Alan Lee (illustrator) =

Illustrator and movie conceptual designer (born 1947)

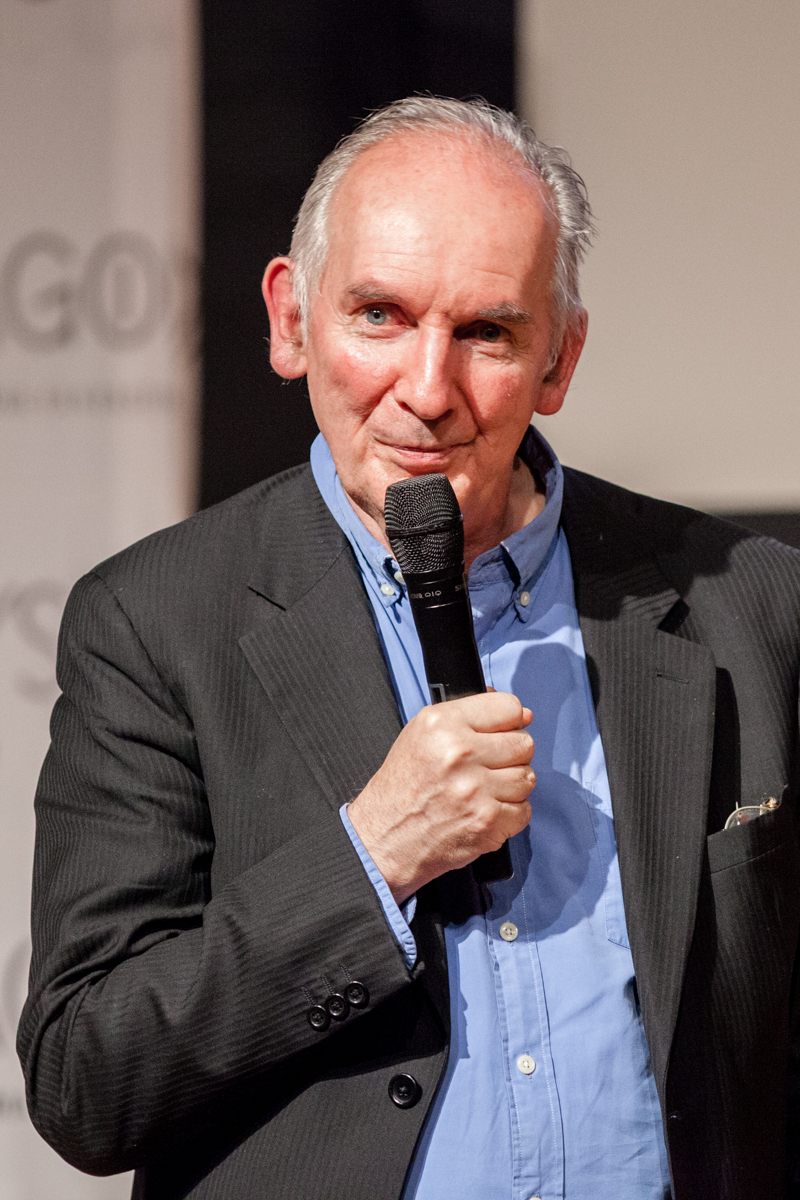
- Lee in 2016
- Born: 20 August 1947 (age 78); Middlesex, England
- Education: Ealing School of Art
- Known for: Illustration, painting, conceptual design
- Awards: Chesley Award; 1989, 1998; Kate Greenaway Medal; 1993; World Fantasy Award; 1998; Academy Award; 2004

Signature
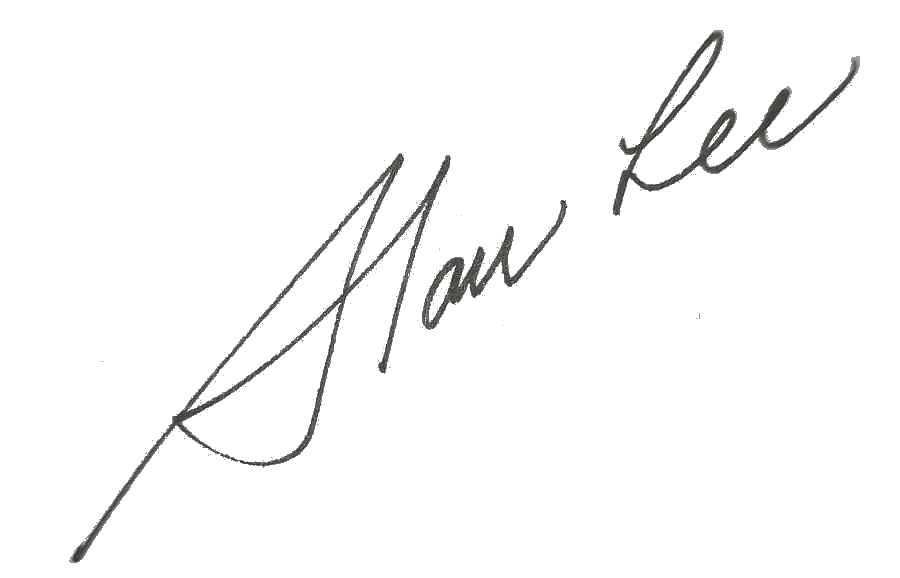

Alan Lee (born 20 August 1947) is an English book illustrator and film conceptual designer. He is best known for his artwork inspired by J. R. R. Tolkien's fantasy novels, and for his work on the concept design of Peter Jackson's film adaptations of Tolkien, The Lord of the Rings and The Hobbit film series.

== Early life ==
Alan Lee was born in Middlesex, England, and studied at the Ealing School of Art.

== Career ==
=== Illustration ===
==== Tolkien ====
Lee has illustrated dozens of fantasy books, including some non-fiction, and many more book covers. Among the numerous works by J. R. R. Tolkien that he has illustrated are the 1992 centenary edition of The Lord of the Rings, a 1999 edition of The Hobbit, the 2007 The Children of Húrin, the 2017 Beren and Lúthien, the 2018 The Fall of Gondolin, and the 2022 The Fall of Númenor. He has given numerous conferences, interviews and masterclasses, such as the one recorded at the Bibliothèque nationale de France in 2020, during the exhibition "Tolkien : voyage en Terre du Milieu".

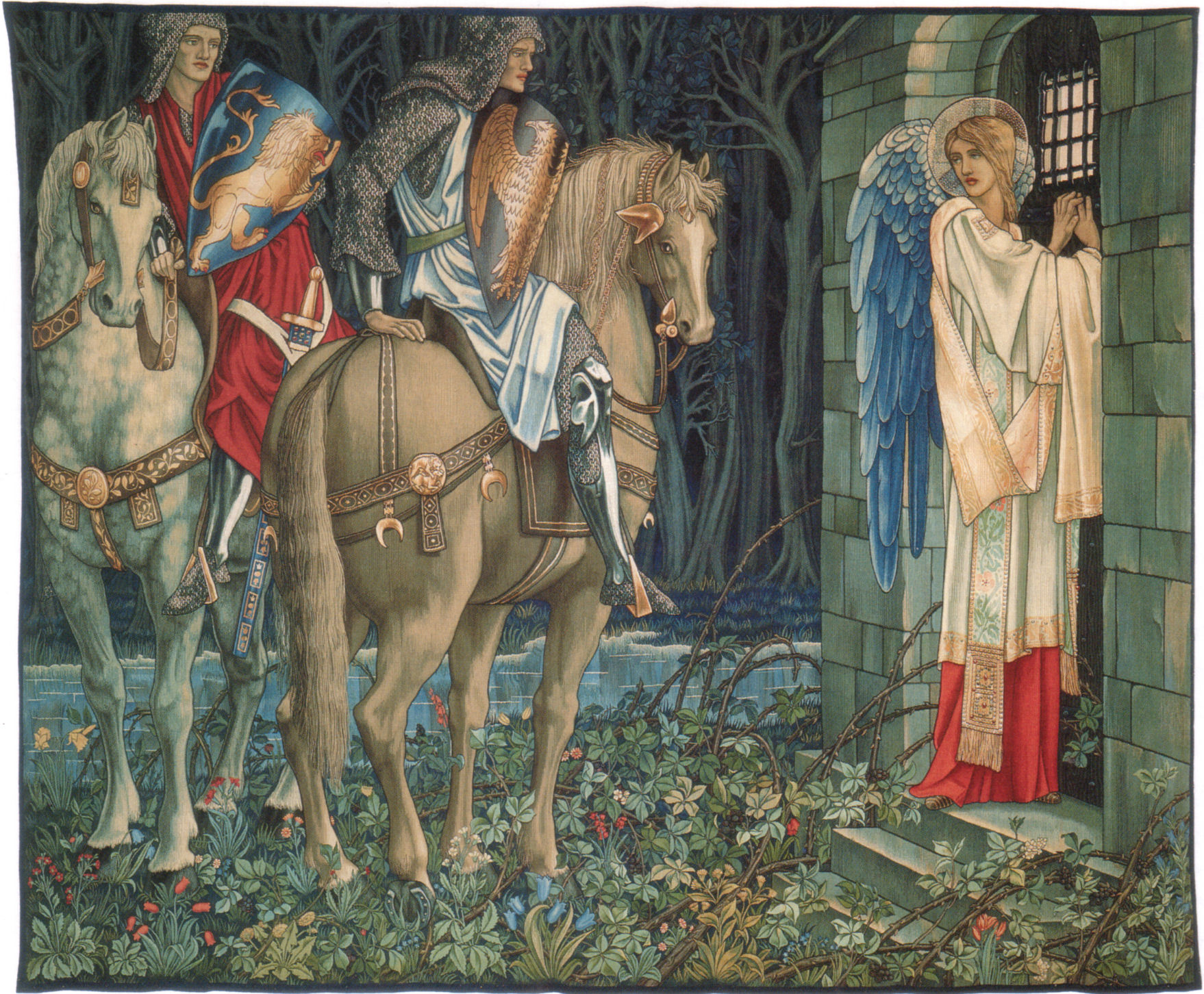
Velten suggests that Lee followed Tolkien's liking of Morris by adopting something of his visual style. Morris's tapestry The Failure of Sir Gawaine illustrated.

Morris's visual influence on Tolkien and beyond, via Lee's illustrations and Peter Jackson's films

Hans Velten describes Lee's illustration "Lady Eowyn bids farewell to Aragorn" as in William Morris's visual style, and in turn transmitting that style to Jackson and the aesthetic of the fantasy-viewing public.

Hans Velten writes that Lee was influenced by William Morris's graphic approach. He suggests that Lee was comfortable with Tolkien's acceptance of Morris, and accordingly made his Middle-earth illustrations more like Morris's style. In Velten's view, Lee's work, especially as concept artist on Peter Jackson's 2001–2003 The Lord of the Rings film trilogy, has influenced the audience's "collective imagination" of how places and people should look in Middle-earth.

==== Other illustrations ====
Non-Tolkien books he has illustrated include Faeries (with Brian Froud), Lavondyss by Robert Holdstock, The Mabinogion (two versions), Castles by David Day, The Mirrorstone by Michael Palin, The Moon's Revenge by Joan Aiken, and Merlin Dreams by Peter Dickinson.

He has illustrated retellings of classics for young people. Two were Rosemary Sutcliff's versions of the Iliad and the Odyssey—namely, Black Ships Before Troy (Oxford, 1993) and The Wanderings of Odysseus (Frances Lincoln, 1995). Another was Adrian Mitchell's version of Ovid's Metamorphoses—namely, Shapeshifters (Frances Lincoln, 2009).

Lee made cover paintings for the 1983 Penguin edition of Mervyn Peake's Gormenghast trilogy. He also did the artwork for Alive!, a 2007 CD by the Dutch band Omnia, released during the Castlefest festival. Watercolour painting and pencil sketches are among the media that Lee commonly uses.

=== Film ===
==== Tolkien ====
Lee's concept art illustration of Orthanc was closely followed by the set designers of Peter Jackson's The Two Towers to create a "bigature" of the tower for filming.

Lee and John Howe were the lead concept artists of Peter Jackson's Lord of the Rings films between 2000 and 2003. They were recruited by director Guillermo del Toro in 2008 for continuity of design in the subsequent The Hobbit films, before joining Jackson when he took over the Hobbit films project. Jackson has explained how he originally recruited the reclusive Lee. By courier to Lee's home in the south of England, he sent two of his previous films, Forgotten Silver and Heavenly Creatures, with a note from himself and Fran Walsh that piqued Lee's interest enough for him to become involved. Lee went on to illustrate and even to help construct many of the scenarios for the movies, including objects and weapons for the actors. For example his illustration of the tower of Orthanc was closely followed by the set designers of The Two Towers to create a "bigature" at 1:35 scale for close-up filming. He made two cameo appearances: in the opening sequence of The Fellowship as one of the nine kings of men who became the Nazgûl; and in The Two Towers as a Rohan soldier in the armoury (over the shoulder of Viggo Mortensen's Aragorn who is talking to Legolas in Elvish).

Two years after completing The Lord of the Rings film series, Lee released a 192-page collection of his concept artwork for the project, The Lord of the Rings Sketchbook (HarperCollins, 2005). Peter Jackson said, "His art captured what I hoped to capture with the films."

Lee had an uncredited cameo appearance in The Fellowship of the Ring as one of the nine kings corrupted by Sauron. He can be seen as the second person from the right, for a few seconds.

==== Other films ====
Lee worked as a concept designer on the films Legend, Erik the Viking, King Kong and the television mini-series Merlin. The art book Faeries, produced in collaboration with Brian Froud, was the basis of a 1981 animated feature of the same name.

== Books illustrated ==
- Faeries (1978)
- Castles (1984)
- Brokedown Palace (1986)
- The Return of the Shadow (1988) Cover art only (for American editions)
- The Treason of Isengard (1989) Cover art only (for American editions)
- The War of the Ring (1990) Cover art only (for American editions)
- The Lord of the Rings (1991)
- The Atlas of Middle-earth (1991) Cover art only
- Sauron Defeated (1992) Cover art only (for American editions)
- Black Ships Before Troy (1993, by Rosemary Sutcliff)
- The Wanderings of Odysseus (1995, by Rosemary Sutcliff)
- The Hobbit (1997)
- The Children of Húrin (2007)
- Tales from the Perilous Realm (2008)
- Beren and Lúthien (2017)
- The Wanderer and Other Old-English Poems (2018) (Folio Society)
- The Fall of Gondolin (2018)
- Unfinished Tales of Númenor and Middle-earth (2020)
- The Lord of the Rings (2022) (Folio Society)
- The Fall of Númenor (2022)

== Awards ==
For his 1978 book with Brian Froud, Faeries, Lee was runner-up for the fantasy Locus Award, year's best art or illustrated book.

For illustrating Merlin Dreams by Peter Dickinson (1988), he won the annual Chesley Award for Best Interior Illustration and he was a highly commended runner-up for the Greenaway Medal. (Note: There are usually eight books on the Greenaway Medal shortlist. According to CCSU, some runners-up through 2002 were Commended (from 1959) or Highly Commended (from 1974). There were 31 high commendations in 29 years including Lee and two others in 1988.) He also won the BSFA Award for Best Artwork, for that year's best single new image. Five years later, he won the Kate Greenaway Medal from the Library Association, recognising the year's best children's book illustration by a British subject. The book was Black Ships Before Troy by Rosemary Sutcliff, a version of the Trojan War story. For the 60th anniversary edition of The Hobbit, Tolkien's 1937 classic, Lee won his second Chesley Award for Interior Illustration (he is a finalist eight times through 2011). For that year's work he won the annual World Fantasy Award, Best Artist, at the 1998 World Fantasy Convention. In 2000, he won the competitive, juried Spectrum Award for fantastic art in the grandmaster category. Lee, Grant Major and Dan Hennah earned the 2004 Academy Award for Best Art Direction for The Lord of the Rings: The Return of the King, third in the film trilogy. In 2016 he was awarded the 'Schwäbischen Lindwurm' of the Dragon Days Crossmedia Fantastikfestival Stuttgart.

== See also ==
- Works inspired by J. R. R. Tolkien
