= Music of Middle-earth =

Theme in Tolkien's fiction

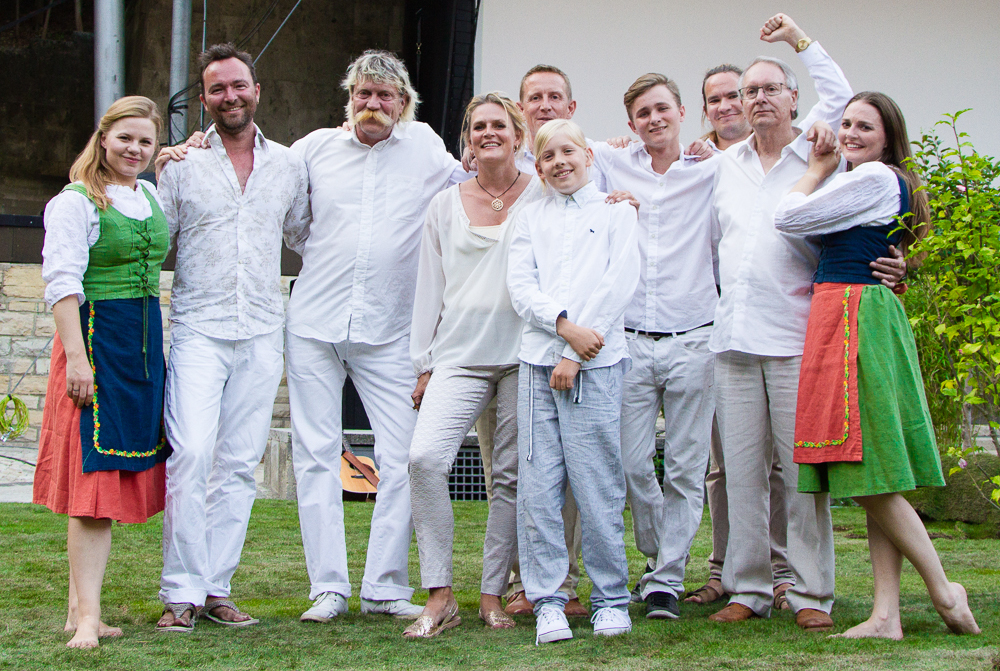
The Danish Tolkien Ensemble has set all the songs in Tolkien's The Lord of the Rings to music.

The music of Middle-earth consists of the music mentioned by J. R. R. Tolkien in his Middle-earth books, the music written by other artists to accompany performances of his work, whether individual songs or adaptations of his books for theatre, film, radio, and games, and music more generally inspired by his books.

Music is at the heart of the Ainulindalë ("The Music of the Ainur"), the creation myth that begins The Silmarillion. Music and singing are mentioned also in the many songs embedded in The Hobbit and The Lord of the Rings, especially in the accounts of places such as Rivendell. Scholars have noted that while readers often skip Tolkien's poetry and songs at a first reading, these in fact are highly relevant and give insight into the meaning of his books.

Amongst dramatic adaptations, Stephen Oliver contributed an extensive and diverse suite of instrumental music and song-settings for the BBC Radio Lord of the Rings adaptation in 1981, while Peter Jackson's Lord of the Rings film trilogy is accompanied by Howard Shore's long, varied, and prizewinning score. The Danish symphonic folk group Tolkien Ensemble has set all the songs in The Lord of the Rings to music. Further popular and classical musicians have been inspired to compose music by Tolkien's writings.

== Tolkien ==
Music and song are mentioned throughout Tolkien's legendarium, in the Tolkien scholar Bradford Lee Eden's view "most obviously" in the Ainulindalë, but also importantly in the culture of the Elves, the Hobbits, and the Riders of Rohan.

=== Ainulindalë: The Music of the Ainur ===
The Ainulindalë (Quenya: "Music of the Ainur") is the creation account in J. R. R. Tolkien's legendarium, the first part of The Silmarillion as published posthumously in 1977. He drafted it in 1919 and rewrote it in 1930. It tells of the creation of Arda by the deity Eru Ilúvatar. It describes the immortal Ainur as "children of Ilúvatar's thought". They are taught the art of music, which becomes the subject of their lives. The Ainur sing alone or in small groups about themes Ilúvatar gives them; he proposes a unified plan for them all: a collaborative symphony where they would sing together in harmony. However, the most powerful of the Ainur, Melkor, disrupts the harmony repeatedly with his "loud, and vain" music. (Note: Tolkien 1977, Ainulindalë) Scholars such as Marjorie Burns have noted the work's basis in the Prose Edda of Norse mythology, and in Tolkien's Catholicism; with parallels between Eru Ilúvatar and God, and between Melkor and the rebellious Satan, in the Genesis account. The Tolkien scholar Verlyn Flieger notes Tolkien's faith, describing his vision of Arda as "a great instrument in God's hands".

=== The Hobbit ===
Lake-town welcomes Thorin

The King beneath the mountains,
The King of carven stone,
The lord of silver fountains
Shall come into his own!

— J. R. R. Tolkien, The Hobbit, ch. 10 "A Warm Welcome" (first verse)

The Hobbit contains 10 songs of various kinds, from light-hearted to reflective. The first is the Dwarves' joking song "Chip the glasses and crack the plates" as they wash up after dinner in Bilbo's home, Bag End, before setting out on their quest. (Note: Tolkien 1937, ch. 1 "An Unexpected Party") The last is Bilbo's version of "The Old Walking Song" in the final chapter; (Note: Tolkien 1937, ch. 19 "The Last Stage") three more versions of the song appear in The Lord of the Rings, each adapted to its context.

=== The Lord of the Rings ===
A Hobbit song

Ho! Ho! Ho! to the bottle I go
To heal my heart and drown my woe.
Rain may fall and wind may blow,
And many miles be still to go,
But under a tall tree I will lie,
And let the clouds go sailing by.

— J. R. R. Tolkien, The Fellowship of the Ring, book 1, ch. 4 "A Short Cut to Mushrooms" (first verse)

The Lord of the Rings contains over 60 poems and songs, an unusual feature for 20th century novels. The verses include songs of many genres: for wandering, marching to war, drinking, and having a bath; narrating ancient myths; of praise and lament (elegy), sometimes reflecting Old English poetry. Brian Rosebury writes that the distinctive thing about Tolkien's verse is its "individuation of poetic styles to suit the expressive needs of a given character or narrative moment", giving as examples of its diversity Gollum's "comic-funereal rhythm" in The cold hard lands / They bites our hands; the Marching Song of the Ents; the celebratory psalm of the Eagles; the hymns of the Elves; the chants of the Dwarves; the "song-speech" of Tom Bombadil; and the Hobbits' diverse songs, "variously comic and ruminative and joyful".

Lynn Forest-Hill writes that Tom Bombadil controls his world with song, in a manner recalling the hero Väinämöinen in the Finnish epic, the Kalevala; indeed, he only speaks in metre.

Corey Olsen states that Tolkien's poems and songs help to connect the reader to his work's deepest themes. Thus, Aragorn explains that the Riders of Rohan "are wise but unlearned, writing no books but singing many songs". As Olsen states, the emphasis of the poem that Aragorn chants, the ubi sunt lament "Where Now the Horse and the Rider?", may "do nothing to move the plot along", but shows how Elves may view mortal men, and supplies "a poignant context both for the memory of Eorl the Young and for the heroic deeds which are to follow".

David Bratman writes that even though there is no sheet music in Tolkien's Middle-earth writings, we do "surprisingly" have "a very good idea" of how some of it should sound. In 1952, Tolkien recited part of The Lord of the Rings for George Sayer to record. The songs were mostly spoken, but Tolkien sang the song of the Stone Troll (sung in the novel by Sam Gamgee), unaccompanied and in a "rough and untrained" voice, but as Bratman comments, "but surely so was Sam's." Sayer states in the liner notes of the LP album of the recordings that Tolkien sang the song to "an old English folk-tune called The Fox and Hens." Bratman states that this is a variant of "The Fox and the Goose" or "The Fox Went Out on a Chilly Night". (Note: The melody for "The Fox" can be heard on YouTube, and sheet music is available free at MichaelKravchuk.com.) He comments that Tolkien sings in a major key, like Cecil Sharp's "southern English melodies" for the song. Bratman finds this "appropriate", noting Tolkien's comment that the Shire "is in fact more or less a Warwickshire village" of around 1897. In short, Bratman concludes, Tolkien intended readers to imagine Hobbits as "English country folk singing English folk songs."

== In adaptations of Tolkien's books ==
=== Settings of Tolkien's songs ===
Donald Swann's 1967 song cycle The Road Goes Ever On contains six of Tolkien's songs. Five are set to music devised by Swann; the sixth, the Quenya song "Namárië", is set to a melody resembling a Gregorian chant, which Tolkien hummed to Swann. The scholar of music Emily Sulka sees Tolkien and Swann using the poems and music to link the story of the novel with "the road always continuing, even when one's individual travel is finished". She finds Swann's account of Tolkien's poems "highly effective".

The Danish group The Tolkien Ensemble set all the poetry in The Lord of the Rings to music, publishing it on four CDs – An Evening in Rivendell (1997), A Night in Rivendell (2000), At Dawn in Rivendell (2002), and (with Christopher Lee) Leaving Rivendell (2005). The project was approved by the Tolkien family and the publishers, HarperCollins. Drawings by Queen Margrethe II of Denmark were used to illustrate the CDs. The settings were well received by critics.

=== BBC Radio series ===
For the 1981 BBC Radio 4 adaptation of The Lord of the Rings, composer Stephen Oliver provided an extensive suite of instrumental themes and song settings, composed within the English pastoral tradition and including a "dark, relentless theme tune [which] perfectly evokes danger and quest." Oliver was sought out in order to produce "essentially English" music, following a failed approach to Malcolm Arnold, and after series adapter Brian Sibley heard a recording of Oliver's theatrical music for a production of Alice Through the Looking Glass.

A soundtrack album featuring a re-recorded and in some cases expanded suite of Oliver's music was released in 1981 as a vinyl LP. This was also included as a bonus CD/cassette in the 1995 commercial box set releases of the drama, and digitally remastered for inclusion in the revamped 2001 reissue (with a demo of John Le Mesurier singing Bilbo's Last Song as a bonus track).

=== Peter Jackson's films ===
Music appears in two forms in Peter Jackson's The Hobbit and Lord of the Rings film trilogies. Firstly, there is Howard Shore's long, varied, and prizewinning score for The Lord of the Rings and then in the score for The Hobbit, not heard by the characters. Secondly, there are the diegetic songs and instrumental music of Middle-earth, which the characters are meant to have heard in the films' narratives. A few of the diegetic songs are Tolkien's, such as the walking song "The Road Goes Ever On", or the hobbits' drinking song "To the Bottle I go"; others, like "The Funeral of Théodred", sung by Miranda Otto playing Éowyn, are wholly invented.

== Based on Tolkien's works ==
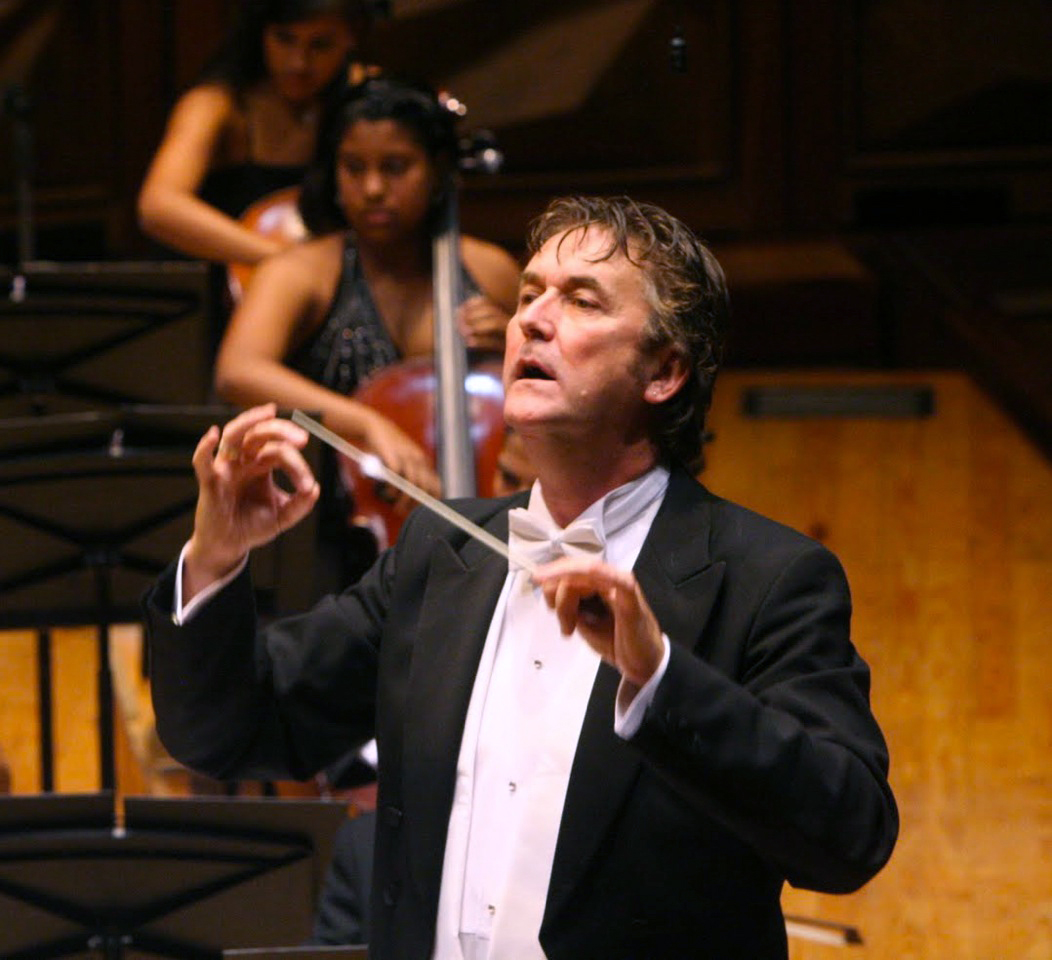
The Dutch composer and trombonist Johan de Meij's first symphony, in 5 movements, is entitled The Lord of the Rings.

A substantial body of music has been created on the basis of Tolkien's works, in a wide range of genres from classical to many kinds of popular music including jazz, blues, country and western, new age, heavy metal, opera, and psychedelic.

=== Classical music ===
In 1988, the Dutch composer and trombonist Johan de Meij completed his Symphony No. 1 "The Lord of the Rings". It had 5 movements, titled "Gandalf", "Lothlórien", "Gollum", "Journey in the Dark", and "Hobbits". In 1996 the Finnish composer Aulis Sallinen assembled materials intended for a ballet into his Symphony No. 7 The Dreams of Gandalf. In the view of the Tolkien scholar David Bratman, both works mainly aim not to tell the story but to create a mood, though de Meij's fourth movement, "Journey in the Dark", is programmatic. Bratman notes, too, that Sallinen's "Gandalf" movement contains a theme based on the letters of his name: as the names of the notes run from A through G, not covering other letters like L or N, the theme spells out GADAF, "a striving, rising theme – all the succeeding notes are in the octave above the initial G." De Meij's symphony also contains a "Gandalf" movement, which Bratman describes as "marked by a full, striving theme, and later breaks into a fast ride on [the great horse] Shadowfax".

In 2025, the English composer Paul Godfrey released a full-cast recording of his planned Lord of the Rings opera on 15 CDs, the first of its kind to be approved by the Tolkien Estate.

=== Popular music ===
The popularity of The Lord of the Rings with a young audience from the 1960s saw its themes and characters reflected in the work of several popular musicians. Progressive rock or "prog rock" is sometimes called "Hobbit rock" because of its frequent use of fantasy, fairy tale, medieval and related lyrics, imagery or sounds, whether it is related to The Lord of the Rings or not.

In 1970, the Swedish musician Bo Hansson released an instrumental concept album entitled Sagan om ringen; it was released internationally as Music Inspired by Lord of the Rings in 1972.

Led Zeppelin's songs "Ramble On", "Misty Mountain Hop", and especially "The Battle of Evermore" duet sung by Robert Plant and Sandy Denny on their untitled 1971 album, make references to several characters and events from The Lord of the Rings, including Sauron, the Ringwraiths, Gollum, and Mordor. The Oxford Handbook of Music and Medievalism treats "Ramble On" as "fantasy medievalism", writing that Plant makes use of the feeling of nostalgia combined with the "haunting, pastoral soundscape" that together set up "the destructive world of war in opposition to an idealized and Arcadian peaceful home".

From the 1980s onwards, many heavy metal acts have been influenced by Tolkien. For instance, the German power-metal band Blind Guardian's 1998 album Nightfall in Middle-Earth consists of songs about and narration of parts of The Silmarillion.

The 1991 album Shepherd Moons by the Irish musician Enya contains an instrumental titled "Lothlórien", in reference to the forest home of Galadriel's elves.

== Analysis ==
Eden describes Flieger's 2002 Splintered Light: Logos and Language in Tolkien's World as "the most important and influential book on both language and music in Tolkien's works", discussing how the two are interwoven as "central themes" throughout The Silmarillion. Stratford Caldecott's 2003 Sacred Fire: The Spiritual Vision of J. R. R. Tolkien analyses Tolkien's mythology from a Catholic point of view, stating that Tolkien's writings "are very much like a musical composition". Eden notes that Tolkien discounted his own musical abilities, but writes that Tolkien's "recorded readings and his recitations of Elvish would indicate otherwise".
