= Beleriand =

Fictional Western region in Tolkien's legendarium

- J. R. R. Tolkien's legendarium location

In-universe information
- Type: large region
- Locations: Arvernien, Doriath, Falas, Nargothrond, Nevrast, Ossiriand, Taur-im-Duinath
- Position: northwestern Middle-earth
- Period: Start of Years of the Trees to end of First Age

In J. R. R. Tolkien's fictional legendarium, Beleriand (Sindarin pronunciation: [bɛˈlɛ.ri.and]) was a region in northwestern Middle-earth during the First Age. Events in Beleriand are described chiefly in his work The Silmarillion: it tells the story of the early Ages of Middle-earth, in a style similar to that of the epics of Nordic literature—stories pervaded by a tone of impending doom. Beleriand also appears in the works The Book of Lost Tales, The Children of Húrin, and The Lays of Beleriand.

In Tolkien's early writing, he coined many prospective names for the region. Among them were Broceliand, the name of an enchanted forest in medieval romance, and Ingolondë—a play on the name England—when he hoped to root a mythology for England in the region. The scholar Gergely Nagy looked at the prose of the Silmarillion and found what may be evidence of the structure and syntax of Beleriand's poetry.

== Fictional history ==
Beleriand was lost beneath the sea at the end of the First Age. The outlines of the continents are purely schematic.

Events in Beleriand are described chiefly in the second half of the Quenta Silmarillion, (Note: Tolkien 1977, chs. 13–24) which tells the story of the early ages of Middle-earth in a style similar to the epic hero tales of Norse mythology. Beleriand also appears in the works The Book of Lost Tales, The Children of Húrin, and in the epic poems of The Lays of Beleriand. (Note: Tolkien 1985, Preface)

The land is occupied by Teleri Elves of King Thingol from the east, who founded the city of Menegroth in the forest realm of Doriath. Other Elves, the Vanyar and Noldor, cross the Belegaer sea to Valinor. Some of the Noldor return to Beleriand to retrieve the Silmarils from the evil Vala Morgoth, but they are resented by the Teleri. Later, Men arrive from the east. Morgoth gathers an army of Orcs, Balrogs and other monsters in his fortress of Angband beneath the Thangorodrim mountains in the north of Beleriand, and attacks the Elves repeatedly. Despite the threat, Thingol refuses to fight alongside the Noldor. One by one, the realm of Doriath as well as the Noldor kingdoms Nargothrond and Gondolin fall to assaults, assisted by betrayals and disputes among Elves, Men, and Dwarves. Finally, Eärendil crosses the Belegaer Sea to ask the Valar to stop Morgoth. They send an army to overcome Morgoth in the War of Wrath. This ends the First Age of Middle-earth: Angband is destroyed, and Morgoth is banished to the void. Beleriand's inhabitants flee, and much of Beleriand sinks into the sea. (Note: Tolkien 1977, ch. 24 Of the Voyage of Earendil and the War of Wrath) Only a small section of the eastern edge of Beleriand survives, including part of the Ered Luin (Blue Mountain) range and the land of Lindon, which became part of the far northwestern shore of Middle-earth. (Note: Tolkien 1977, Foreword)

== Fictional geography ==
Beleriand is a region in the far northwest of Middle-earth, bordering the great sea, Belegaer. It is bounded to the north by the Ered Engrin, the Iron Mountains, and to the east by the Ered Luin, the Blue Mountains. (Note: Tolkien 1977, ch. 14 "Of Beleriand and its Realms")

Places in Beleriand
Place	Description
Arvernien	The southernmost region of Beleriand, bordered on the east by the Mouths of Sirion. It contained the birch forest of Nimbrethil, mentioned in the poem "Song of Eärendil", which Frodo hears in Rivendell: "Eärendil was a mariner / that tarried in Arvernien; / he built a boat of timber felled / in Nimbrethil to journey in; ..." (Note: Tolkien 1954a, book 2, ch. 1 "Many Meetings") (Note: Tolkien 1977, "Index of Names", "Arvernien")
Dor Daedeloth ("Land of the Shadow of Dread")	Far to the north, the area around Morgoth's fortress of Angband under the peaks of Thangorodrim, and the Ered Engrin, the Iron Mountains.
Doriath ("Land of the fence", i.e. the Girdle of Melian)	The realm of the Sindar, the Grey Elves of King Thingol. (Note: Tolkien 1977, "Index of Names", "Doriath")
The Falas ("shore")	The realm of Círdan the Shipwright and his Sindar Elves in the years of Starlight and the First Age of the Sun. They lived in two havens, Eglarest at the mouth of the River Nenning, and Brithombar at the mouth of the River Brithon. The Havens were besieged during the First Battle of Beleriand. When the Havens were destroyed, Círdan's people fled to the Mouths of Sirion and the Isle of Balar. (Note: Tolkien 1977, ch. 10 "Of the Sindar")
Gondolin ("hidden rock")	A hidden city of Elves in the north of Beleriand, founded by Turgon, and hidden from Morgoth by mountains. (Note: Tolkien 1977, "Index of Names", "Gondolin")
Hithlum ("mist-shadow")	The region north of Beleriand near the icy Helcaraxë. It contains Mithrim, where the High Kings of the Noldor had their halls, and Dor-lómin, later a fief of Men of the House of Hador. Hithlum was cold and rainy, but fertile. It is bordered by mountains; to the east and south by the Ered Wethrin, and to the west by the Ered Lómin. (Note: Tolkien 1977, Map of Beleriand and the lands to the north)
Lammoth	Shoreline west of the Ered Lómin. Named from Morgoth's great cry while fighting Ungoliant, the echoes of which ever lingered there. (Note: Tolkien 1977, ch. 9 "Of the Flight of the Noldor")
March of Maedhros	The northeastern border region of Beleriand. A great fortress was built on the hill of Himring, the chief stronghold of Maedhros, from which he guarded the area. It was the only fortress to survive the Dagor Bragollach, the Battle of Sudden Flame; the forces of Angband captured it in the Nirnaeth Arnoediad, the Battle of Unnumbered Tears. (Note: Tolkien 1994, "The Grey Annals", p. 77) After the Drowning of Beleriand, the peak of Himring remained above the waves as an island. (Note: See The Treason of Isengard, p. 124 and note 18, and Unfinished Tales, note on map in Introduction.) The gap in the mountains to the south of this area was known as Maglor's Gap.
Nargothrond ("underground fortress on the river Narog")	Built by Finrod Felagund, delved into the banks of the river Narog in Beleriand. (Note: Tolkien 1977, ch. 13 "Of the Return of the Noldor")
Nevrast ("hither shore", as opposed to Aman)	A coastal region in the north of Beleriand; its city is Vinyamar. It was the centre of Turgon's Elven kingdom until people left for Gondolin.
Ossiriand ("land of seven rivers")	The most easterly region of Beleriand during the First Age, between the Ered Luin and the river Gelion. It is a green and forested land. The rivers are the Gelion, and its six tributaries: Ascar, Thalos, Legolin, Brilthor, Duilwen and Adurant.

== Analysis ==
=== Naming ===
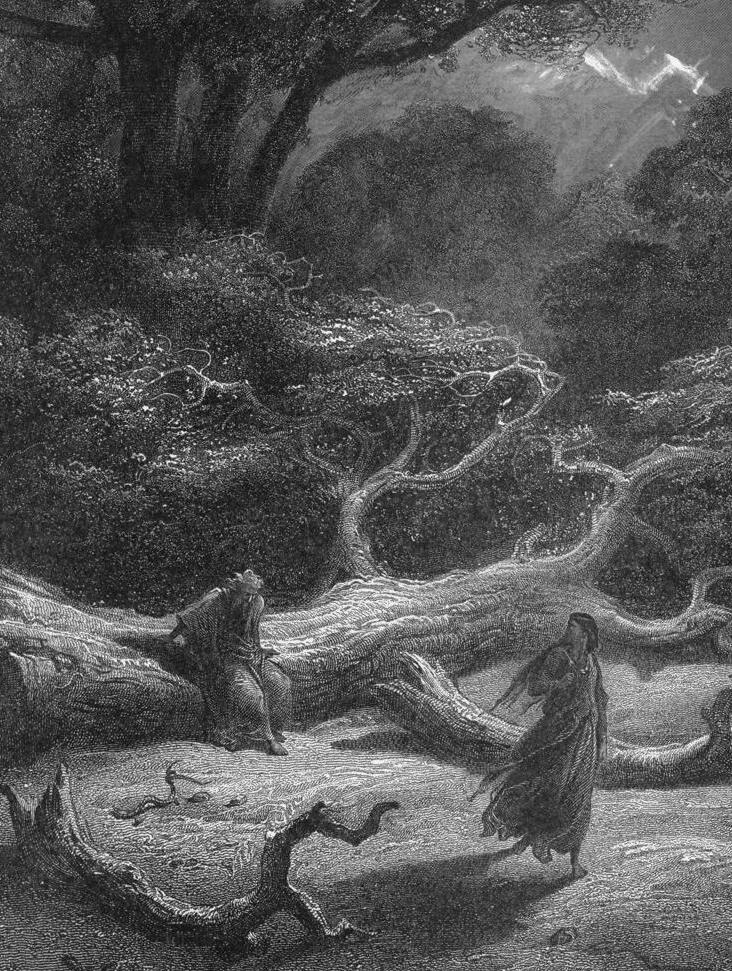
Tolkien borrowed the Arthurian place-name Brocéliande, an enchanted forest, for an early version of Beleriand. Detail of 1868 illustration by Gustave Doré

Beleriand had many different names in Tolkien's early writings, including Broceliand, the name of an enchanted forest in medieval romance, Golodhinand, Noldórinan ("valley of the Noldor"), Geleriand, Bladorinand, Belaurien, Arsiriand, Lassiriand, and Ossiriand (later used for the easternmost part of Beleriand). (Note: Tolkien 1986, "Commentary on Canto I")

One of Beleriand's early names was Ingolondë, a play on "England", part of Tolkien's long-held but ultimately unsuccessful aim to create what Shippey calls "a mighty patron for his country, a foundation-myth more far-reaching than Hengest and Horsa, one to which he could graft his own stories." Tolkien's aim had been to root his mythology for England in the scraps of names and myths that had survived, and to situate it in a land in the northwest of the continent, by the sea.

=== A sense of doom ===
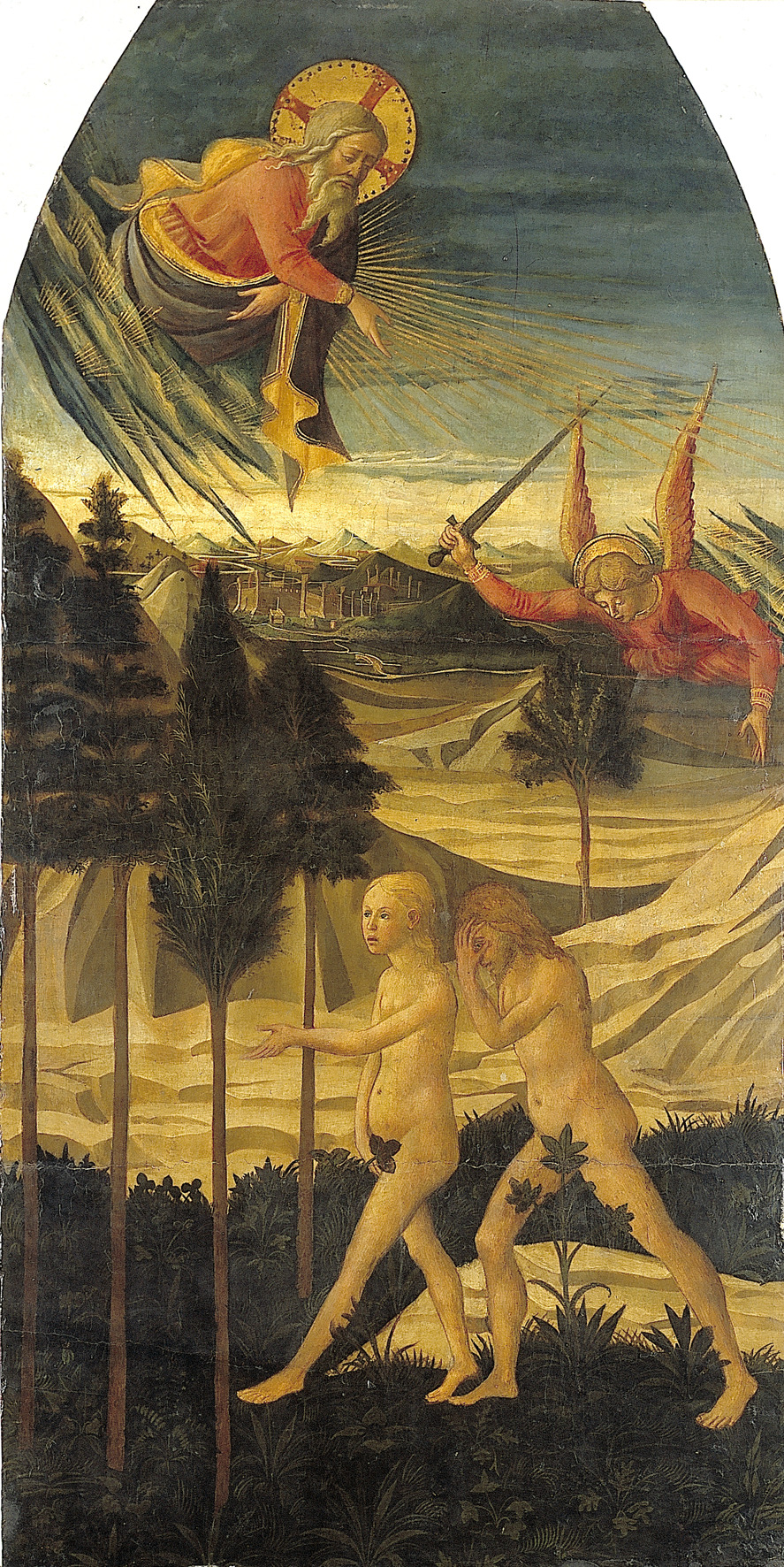
Men flee into Beleriand from the East: perhaps, Shippey writes, they were expelled from Eden. Painting by D. di Michelino, c. 1460

Shippey writes that the Quenta Silmarillion has a tightly-woven plot, each part leading ultimately to tragedy. There are three Hidden Elvish Kingdoms in Beleriand, founded by relatives, and they are each betrayed and destroyed. The Kingdoms are each penetrated by a mortal Man, again all related to each other; and the sense of doom, which Shippey glosses as "future disaster", hangs heavy over all of the characters in the tale.

Tom Shippey's analysis of the Hidden Kingdoms of Beleriand
Hidden Kingdom	Elvish Kings (all relatives)	Man who penetrates the Kingdom	Result
Nargothrond	Finrod	Túrin	City destroyed
Doriath	Thingol	Beren	City destroyed
Gondolin	Turgon	Tuor	City destroyed

3 related Kings and 3 related intruders into their Hidden Kingdoms (Note: Tolkien 1977, "Of the Rings of Power and the Third Age": Family Trees I and II: "The house of Finwë and the Noldorin descent of Elrond and Elros", and "The descendants of Olwë and Elwë") (Note: Tolkien 1955, Appendix A: Annals of the Kings and Rulers, I The Númenórean Kings)

Melian the Maia	THINGOL of the Teleri (Doriath)	House of Bëor	House of Haleth
Barahir	Belegund	Hareth
Lúthien	BEREN	Rían	Huor
TUOR

House of Hador
Galdor
Húrin
TÚRIN

Finwë of the Noldor
Fingolfin
TURGON (Gondolin)
Idril

Indis of the Vanyar
Finarfin
FINROD (Nargothrond)

Key:
Elves	King (Realm)
Men	Intruder
Maiar	

Shippey writes that the human race seen in Beleriand in the First Age did not "originate 'on stage' in Beleriand, but drifts into it, already sundered in speech, from the East [the main part of Middle-earth]. There something terrible has happened to them of which they will not speak: 'A darkness lies behind us... and we have turned our backs upon it'". He comments that the reader is free to assume the Christian interpretation that the Satanic Morgoth has carried out the Biblical serpent's temptation of Adam and Eve, and that "the incoming Edain and Easterlings are all descendants of Adam flying from Eden and subject to the curse of Babel."

=== "Lost" poetry ===
The Tolkien scholar Gergely Nagy, writing in 2004, notes that The Silmarillion does not contain explicitly embedded samples of Beleriand's poetry in its prose, as Tolkien had done with his many poems in The Lord of the Rings. Instead, the prose of The Silmarillion hints repeatedly at the structure and syntax of its "lost" poetry. Nagy notes David Bratman's description of the book as containing prose styles that he classifies as "the Annalistic, [the] Antique, and the Appendical". The implication of the range of styles is that The Silmarillion is meant to represent, in Christopher Tolkien's words, "a compilation, a compendious narrative, made long afterwards from sources of great diversity (poems, and annals, and oral tales)". Nagy infers from verse-like fragments of text in The Silmarillion that the poetry of Beleriand used alliteration, rhyme, and rhythm including possibly iambics.

This applies to the Ainulindalë, Tolkien's account of the godlike Ainur:

Gergely Nagy's analysis of poem-like prose in the Ainulindalë
Ainulindalë, (Note: Tolkien 1977, Ainulindalë) with Nagy's emphasis

and they built lands and Melkor destroyed them;
valleys they delved and Melkor raised them up;
mountains they carved and Melkor threw them down;
seas they hollowed and Melkor spilled them;

Nagy's commentary
Prose adapted from poetry, with "rhetorics" and "stricter syntactic patterns"; parataxis and balanced clauses "bearing a structural and thematic similarity"

It applies, too, to the narrative of Elves and Men in the Beleriand landscape, in the Quenta Silmarillion:

Nagy's analysis of poem-like prose in the Quenta Silmarillion
Poem-like prose (Note: Tolkien 1977, ch. 15 Of the Noldor in Beleriand) with Nagy's emphasis

But there was a deep way under the mountains
delved in the darkness of the world
by the waters that flowed out
to join the streams of Sirion.

Nagy's commentary
"Alliteration and rhythm are beautifully seen together"

In a few places, it is possible to relate the adapted verse in the prose to actual verse in Tolkien's legendarium. This can be done, for instance, in parts of the story of Túrin. Here, he realizes he has just killed his friend Beleg:

Nagy's analysis of adapted verse lines in the Quenta Silmarillion
"Adapted verse lines" (Note: Tolkien 1977, ch. 21 Of Túrin Turambar) with Nagy's emphasis

Then Túrin stood stone still and silent, staring
on that dreadful death, knowing what he had done.

The verse Túrin (1273–1274)

stone-faced he stood standing frozen
on that dreadful death his deed knowing

Nagy's commentary
"Nearly all the alliterating words, together with the alliteration pattern itself, doubtless derive from the poem; the imagery and to some extent the very phrasing of this very moving central scene ... [are] virtually unchanged."

== See also ==
- Belerion

== Sources ==
- Garth, John (2020). The Worlds of J. R. R. Tolkien: The Places that Inspired Middle-earth. London: Frances Lincoln. ISBN 978-0-7112-4127-5. OCLC 1181910875.
- Shippey, Tom (2005) [1982]. The Road to Middle-Earth: How J. R. R. Tolkien Created a New Mythology (Third ed.). HarperCollins. ISBN 978-0-261-10275-0.
- Tolkien, J. R. R. (1954a). The Fellowship of the Ring. The Lord of the Rings. Boston: Houghton Mifflin. OCLC 9552942.
- Tolkien, J. R. R. (1955). The Return of the King. The Lord of the Rings. Boston: Houghton Mifflin. OCLC 519647821.
- Tolkien, J. R. R. (1977). Christopher Tolkien (ed.). The Silmarillion. Boston: Houghton Mifflin. ISBN 978-0-395-25730-2.
- Tolkien, J. R. R. (1985). Christopher Tolkien (ed.). The Lays of Beleriand. Boston: Houghton Mifflin. ISBN 0-395-39429-5.
- Tolkien, J. R. R. (1986). Christopher Tolkien (ed.). The Shaping of Middle-earth. Boston: Houghton Mifflin. ISBN 978-0-395-42501-5.
- Tolkien, J. R. R. (1994). Christopher Tolkien (ed.). The War of the Jewels. Boston: Houghton Mifflin. ISBN 0-395-71041-3.
