= Fictional music =

Music created for a fictional work

Fictional music is music created for a fictional work, featured in a narrative, and composed (or performed) by one or more of the work's fictional characters.

== Characteristics ==
The essence of fictional music is usually to convince the recipient that he could experience it in the real world. It often has a diegetic character. Depending on a work, it can be serious, but it can also take on a playful and parodic character (e.g. in concert from the 1964 film The World of Henry Orient). Fictional music can be important to the plot. For example, in Krzysztof Kieślowski's film Three Colours. Blue, the plot is centered on the fictional composer Patrice de Courcy and his music.

== In literature ==
In literature, the description of fictional music can be very poetic (see ekphrasis). For example, the description of fictional music in books such as Doctor Faustus by Thomas Mann or A Clockwork Orange by Anthony Burgess has been described in such a fashion.

Science fiction writers have occasionally portrayed futuristic music, or alien music, some played on fictional instruments; such music has been said to be "difficult to describe". In the 2012 science fiction novel The Hydrogen Sonata by Iain M. Banks, the eponymous sonata is an extremely complex piece that exemplifies a challenge for virtually immortal beings in post-scarcity societies, and potentially a metaphor for the interaction of advanced civilization with material reality.

Likewise, fictional music can be found in fantasy literature. Music and song are mentioned throughout Tolkien's legendarium, in the Tolkien scholar Bradford Lee Eden's view "most obviously" in the Ainulindalë ("Music of the Ainur", the creation account in said legendarium), but also importantly in the culture of the Elves, the Hobbits, and the Riders of Rohan.

== In audiovisual media ==
In the case of audiovisual media, fictional music may be partly real. Fictional music in such media may consist of fragments audible to viewers, suggesting the existence of longer, complete (and fictitious) forms not presented in the audible work. For example, in Kieślowski's movie Three Colors. Blue, the music of the fictional composer Patrice de Courcy can be heard in the film – in reality, however, de Courcy's "fictional music" was composed by a real composer, here, Zbigniew Preisner. Similarly, the "fictitious music" of the fictional composer Van den Budenmayer can be heard in movies Blue and Red in the same trilogy and in another film by Kieślowski, The Double Life of Veronica. There, too, it is actually music composed by Preisner. Similar examples include Hubert Bath's Cornish Rhapsody from Love Story, Nigel Hess's Fantasy for Violin and Orchestra from Ladies in Lavender, and Max Steiner's Magic Isle Symphony from City for Conquest. Some film compositions are based on literary works, such as the concert segment in The World of Henry Orient, actually composed by Ken Lauber. That piece is based on writer Nora Johnson's description of the concert in her novel The World of Henry Orient, that inspired the later film. Some of these fictitious, usually unfinished pieces, have received actual reviews written by music critics, such as when critic and composer Hans Keller wrote a reviews of the nine-minute "concert", in fact music by Leith Stevens from the film Night Song; likewise many of Preisner's works from Kieślowski's films have received a number of reviews.

Another well known example of fictional music played by fictional musicians includes the music from the film Blues Brothers, although the titular band was in fact real and preceded the film. The band Spinal Tap, on the other hand, was initially fictitious, but gained popularity, and actors playing the roles of its fictitious musicians also performed at real concerts (and subsequently, a real film was also made about the not-quite-fictitious band itself, This Is Spinal Tap). In anime Macross 7 many songs attributed to the fictional band Fire Bomber were in fact done by the real band Humming Bird; in a number of other anime works, fictional musicians fronting for real ones have gained significant popularity. Many other examples exist of real music attributed to fictional bands and musicians.

== Fictional musical instruments ==
The Encyclopedia of Science Fiction notes that future fictional instruments are generally either "variants on traditional instruments and those that exploit future technology".

The following are some examples of both of these types of musical instruments.

- In the Dune universe, the baliset is a very long, nine-stringed zither. In the 1984 film Dune, the baliset is depicted using a cosmetically altered Chapman stick.
- In the Futurama television series, a fictional musical instrument called "the Holophonor" was introduced. It resembles an oboe and produces holographic images that respond to the mood of the performer. It has been suggested that this instrument, while currently fictional, might be constructed in the near future given the current trends in technology.
- The aforementioned Hydrogen Sonata of Iain M. Banks can be performed only on a complex instrument called the Antagonistic Undecagonstring, which requires not only two feet for its pedals but also four arms.
- Jack Vance's Night Lamp (1996) introduces another bizarre instrument: a foghorn which "combines a complex brass instrument, a kind of bagpipe, and a nose flute whose mastery requires the development of a 'good nasal embouchure'".
- In the Star Trek universe, the Ressikan flute is an alien musical instrument played by Captain Picard. Resembling a tin whistle, it has been described as "one of the most iconic props in Trek history".
- The rock band Disaster Area, featured in The Hitchhiker's Guide to the Galaxy, play the "massive" photon-ajuitar (its name suggesting a guitar-like instrument, but also described as having a keyboard), the bass detonator, and the Megabang drum complex (often needing to be played by a robot due to the absence of the band's drummer).
- In the American Dad! episode Standard Deviation, Jeff Fischer attempts to create the turin, a music instrument resembling a bagpipe-lute hybrid that he envisioned after drinking hallucinogenic tea.

Hypothetical musical instruments using live animals, intended as thought experiments or as bizarre humour, include the cat organ and the piganino.

== See also ==
- Film score
- Musical fiction
- Nerd music
