= Tom Loback =

American artist and Tolkien scholar (1949–2015)

- Born: February 16, 1949; Brooklyn, New York
- Died: March 5, 2015 (aged 66)
- Known for: Illustrations of The Silmarillion

Tom Loback (February 16, 1949 – March 5, 2015) was an artist, known for his illustrations of characters from J. R. R. Tolkien's 1977 book The Silmarillion, his miniature figurines, and his public artworks in New York. He contributed also as a Tolkien scholar interested in Tolkien's constructed languages.

== Biography ==
Tom Loback was born on February 16, 1949, in Brooklyn, New York. As well as his Middle-earth work and his driftwood sculptures, he also created figurines of characters from the American Civil War and from fantasy works. Loback died of the after-effects of the September 11 attacks.

=== Driftwood sculptures ===
His best-known public artworks were sculptures made from driftwood and exhibited on the Hudson River in Manhattan, New York; those works were anonymous and his identity appeared mysterious, though it was never secret. Loback collected the materials from the Hudson River itself; when a woman scolded him for "ruining the city's 'pristine' nature", he replied that the shoreline was composed of railroad landfill. He created some thousands of driftwood sculptures, taking around half an hour to create each one.

=== Tolkien's Middle-earth ===
Loback contributed to the appreciation of J. R. R. Tolkien's legendarium in two ways: through his art, and with scholarly study. The Tolkien scholar Bradford Lee Eden commented that Loback's work was "unique" in featuring both Tolkien's scripts (Cirth and Tengwar) and Elvish languages (both Quenya and Sindarin) in his art, and in his imitation of the style of medieval illuminated manuscripts. His artistic vision of The Silmarillion has been celebrated alongside that of other Tolkien illustrators: in 1990, Mythlore set Loback and three others the task of illustrating the confrontation between the maker of the Silmarils, Fëanor, and his half-brother Fingolfin.

The linguist and computer scientist Carl F. Hostetter wrote that Loback's contribution to Tolkien linguistics was in its nomenclature. Loback wrote on Middle-earth subjects for magazines including Beyond Bree and Little Gwaihir, and the linguistic journals Vinyar Tengwar and Parma Eldalamberon.

== Works ==
=== Books ===
- Halls of the Elven-King (Fortresses of Middle-earth). Charlottesville: Iron Crown Enterprises, 1988 (ISBN 978-1-5580-6015-9)

=== Scholarly articles ===
- "The Kindreds, Houses, and Population of the Elves during the First Age" (Mythlore 14.1, 1987)
- "Orc Hosts, Armies and Legions: A Demographic Study" (Mythlore 16.4, 1990)
- "To -E or -NE? On the Quenya Past Tense" (Parma Eldalamberon 9, 1990)

=== Artworks ===
A selection of Loback's The Silmarillion artworks, which he uploaded to Commons, is shown here.

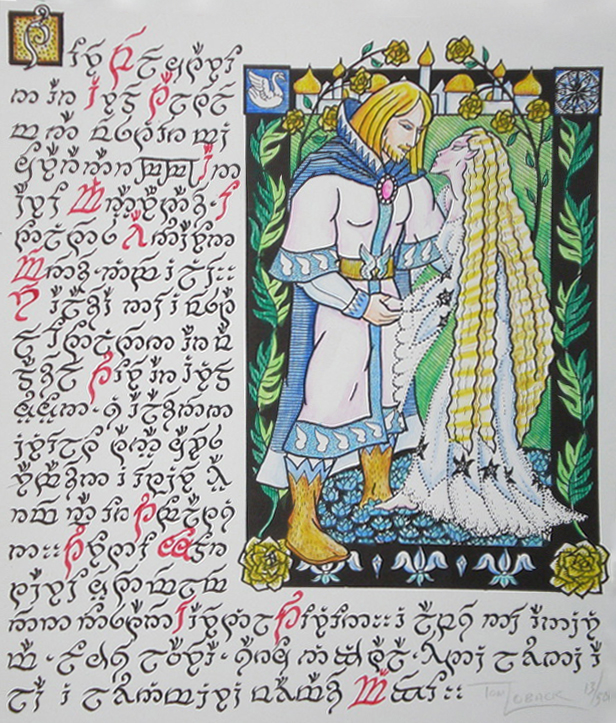
The Wedding of Tuor and Idril

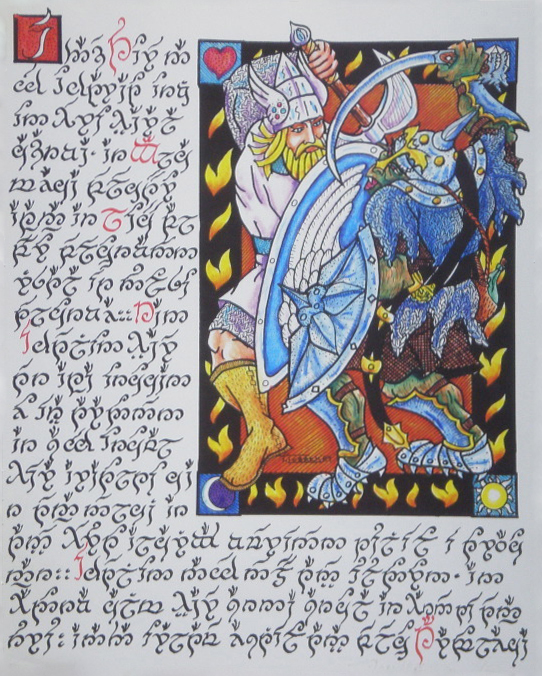
Tuor slays Othrod

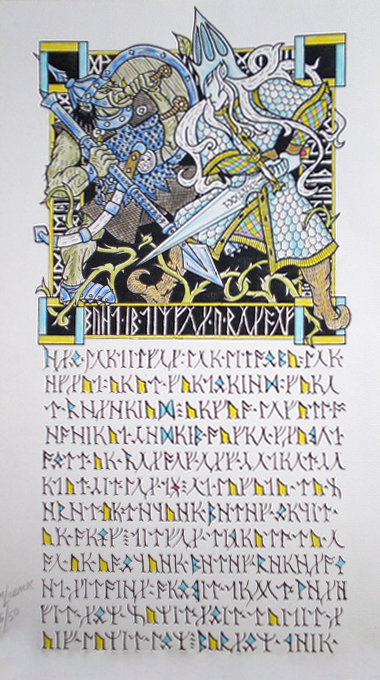
Thingol Fights Boldog

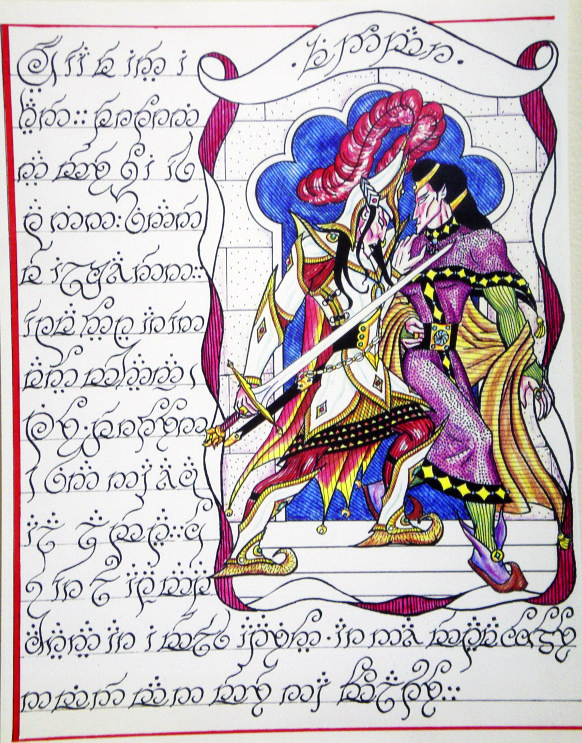
Fëanor and Fingolfin

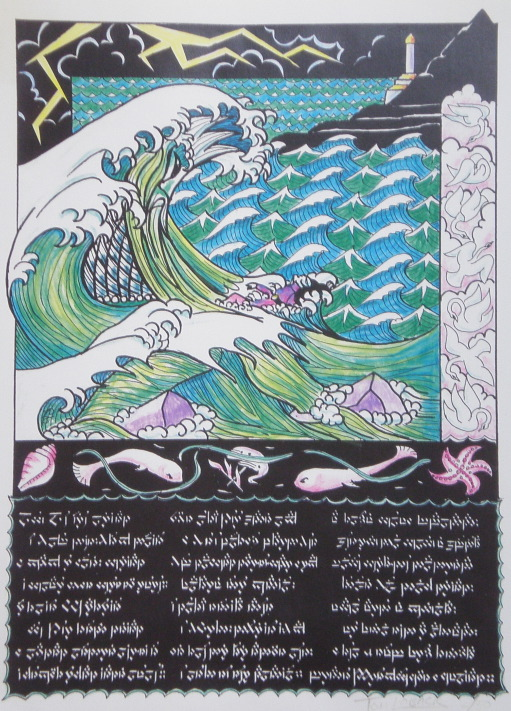
Ulmo saves Voronwe

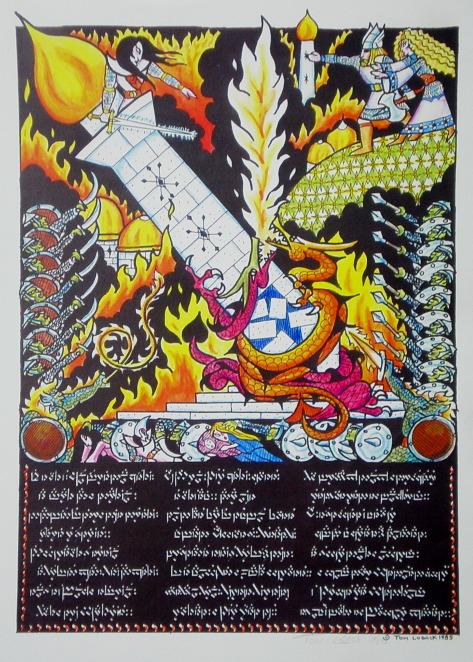
The Fall of Turgon's Tower

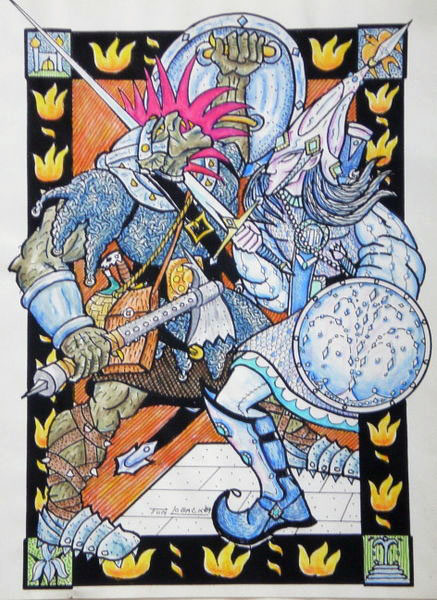
Ecthelion slays Orcobal

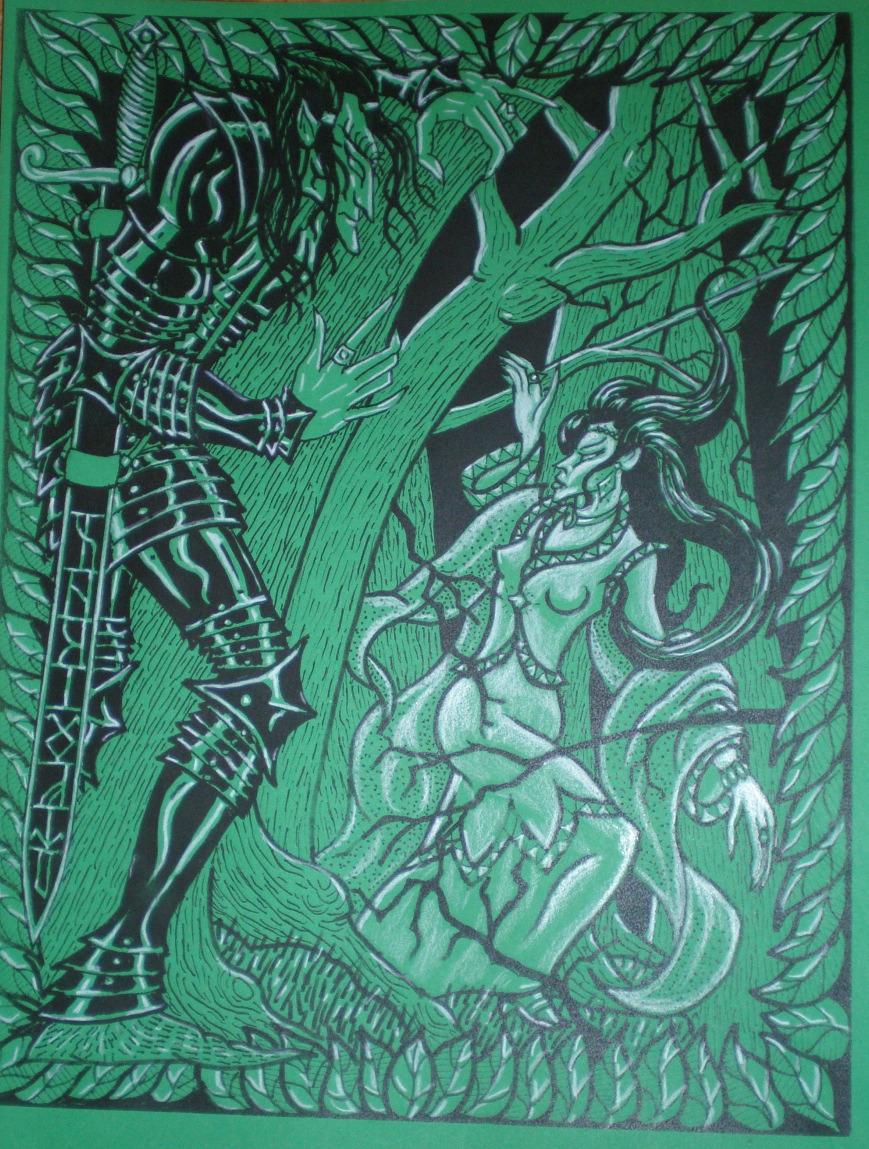
Eöl and Aredhel

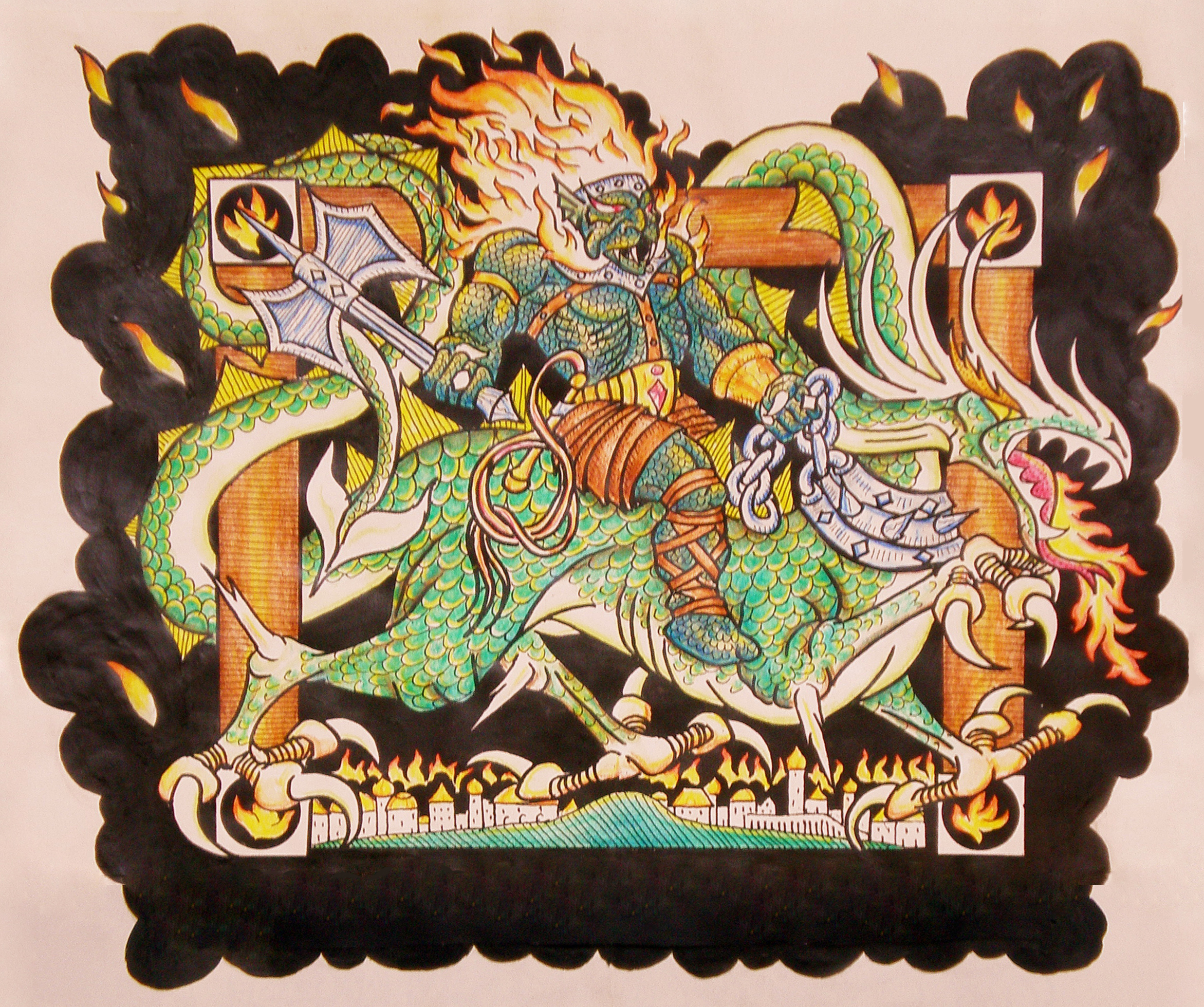
Gothmog, Lord of Balrogs
