= Sailor Free =

Italian rock band

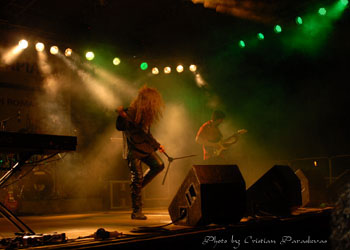

Background information
- Origin: Rome, Italy
- Genres: Art Rock, Progressive, Psychedelic
- Years active: 1991-1996; 2010-12
- Labels: Tide Records, Flying Records, Labyrinth, The Laser's Edge
- Members: David Petrosino; Stefano “The Hook” Barelli; Alphonso Nini; Stefano Tony
- Website: www.sailorfree.com

Sailor Free is an Italian progressive rock band, originally formed in 1991.

== History ==
Sailor Free was conceived in Rome, by four musicians from the city's local scene: drummer Stefano Toni, bassist Alfonso Nini, guitarist Stefano Barelli and singer/keyboardist David Petrosino. Toni was the only member who had previous success, with the punk rock band "Lunar Sex".

The band released their self-titled debut album in 1992, through the Italian label Tide Records. Distribution was handled separately by Flying Records, and a short tour of Italy followed.

1994 saw the arrival of Sailor Free's second album, “The Fifth Door”. It was released by The Labyrinth, an imprint of the Laser’s Edge label. The album and subsequent tour garnered positive reviews from critics and fans alike.

In 1996, the band took an extended break to rest and work on other musical projects.

“The Fifth Door” was reissued in 2004. Noted for its unique style, the album attracted new fans while rekindling the interest of older ones.

After reforming in 2010, Sailor Free produced a short film titled “A Dream Of Cans”. It featured the song "Daeron", which was the first single from their forthcoming album. The film became an official selection at the 2011 Lenola Film Festival.

The band's third album, "The Spiritual Revolution (Part 1)", was released in 2012. It was a concept album, inspired by J. R. R. Tolkien's “Silmarillion” and the Spiritual Revolution movement. In reviewing the album, critic G. W. Hill wrote, "The mix of progressive rock sounds here is quite diverse. At times I hear Pink Floyd, at other points King Crimson. Still other sections are quite spacey. All in all, it works to create an effective album." Music Waves described the album as pleasant, but uninspired. The review further stated that the band's performance was good, but without great virtuosity. Donato Zoppo of Movimenti Prog called it "un album ambizioso e complesso" ("a complex and ambitious album").

== Band members ==
- David Petrosino - voice, piano, keyboards
- Stefano “The Hook” Barelli - guitars
- Alphonso Nini - bass
- Stefano Tony - drums

== Discography ==
=== Album ===
- 1992 - Sailor Free
- 1994 - The Fifth Door
- 2012 - Spiritual Revolution
- 2016 - Spiritual Revolution Pt.II
- 2025 - Spiritual Revolution Pt.III

=== Videoclip ===
- 1992 - Rejoice
- 2011 - Daeron (A dream of cans)
