= Symphony No. 1 The Lord of the Rings =

1988 symphony for concert band by Johan de Meij

Symphony No. 1 The Lord of the Rings, by Johan de Meij

Symphony No. 1 The Lord of the Rings is the first symphony for concert band written by Johan de Meij, and one of several works of classical music based on J. R. R. Tolkien's fantasy The Lord of the Rings. It premiered in 1988 with the Groot Harmonieorkest van de Belgische Gidsen conducted by Norbert Nozy.

In 1989 the symphony won the Sudler Composition Award.

== Structure ==
The symphony consists of five movements, each illustrating a personage or an important episode from the book:

1. Gandalf (The Wizard): this movement is "marked by a full, striving theme, and later breaks into a fast ride on Shadowfax."
2. Lothlórien (The Elvenwood)
3. Gollum (Sméagol)
4. Journey in the Dark
  a. The Mines of Moria
  b. The Bridge of Khazad-Dûm
5. Hobbits

== Reception ==
The CD by the military band Koninklijke Militaire Kapel helped give the symphony worldwide acclaim. In 1989 it won the Sudler Composition Award. It has been recorded by several orchestras. An orchestral version of the piece, orchestrated by Henk de Vlieger, was premiered and recorded in 2001 by the London Symphony Orchestra to coincide with the release of the 2001 film, The Fellowship of the Ring.

The musicologist Estelle Jorgensen wrote that while the symphony has a programmatic aspect, it is "also formally interesting as sheer instrumental sound."

The Tolkien scholar David Bratman noted in 2010 that the symphony had attracted four recordings. He commented that though it was Dutch, it was in the tradition of British concert band and symphonic composers like Malcolm Arnold and Gustav Holst. He stated, too, that like another symphony based on The Lord of the Rings, the Finnish composer Aulis Sallinen's 1996 Symphony No. 7 The Dreams of Gandalf, it mainly aims not to tell the story but to create a mood. Thus, three of the movements introduce characters – Gandalf, Gollum, and (the finale) the Hobbits. The second movement, Bratman wrote, presents the character of a place, the Elvish wood of Lothlórien, "which, like everyone from Bo Hansson to Enya, de Meij seems to hear as steamy." He made an exception for the fourth movement, "Journey in the Dark", which does narrate a story, the dangerous passage through the Mines of Moria.

In celebration of the symphony's 25th anniversary, de Meij conducted the Performance of the piece by the bands of Valparaiso University.

In 2001, Paul Lavender wrote a shorter, Grade III variation of the symphony, condensing three of de Meij's five movements into a concert version. It was premiered at the 2001 Midwest Clinic by the VanderCook College of Music, directed by De Meij.

== Recordings ==
- Koninklijke Militaire Kapel conducted by Pierre Kuijpers (Ottavo, 1989). The composer served as music advisor for this recording.
- The Danish Concert Band conducted by Jørgen Misser Jensen (Copenhagen, 1994)
- Ensemble vents et percussion de Quebec conducted by René Joly (ATMA, 1997)
- London Symphony Orchestra conducted by David Warble (2001)
- Blaeserphilharmonie Regensburg conducted by Jörg Seggelke (2007)

== See also ==
- Music of Middle-earth
- Music of The Lord of the Rings film series § Symphony (symphony based on music from the Peter Jackson films)
