= De Vlieger =

De Vlieger may refer to:

- Geert De Vlieger (born 1971), former footballer
- Henk de Vlieger (born 1953), musician
- Simon de Vlieger (1601–1653), artist
- Thijs de Vlieger (born 1982), musician
