= Henk de Vlieger =

Dutch musician

Henk de Vlieger (born 1953 in Schiedam) is a Dutch percussionist, composer and arranger.

Since 1984 he has been a permanent member of the Netherlands Radio Philharmonic Orchestra as percussionist. In May 2011 he was appointed artistic advisor to the orchestra.

Although as a creative artist de Vlieger has written a number of original compositions, he is more noted for his arrangements of works from the classic repertoire for orchestra or instrumental ensembles. These include a number of transcriptions of the works of Richard Wagner; amongst them The Ring: an orchestral adventure (1991), Parsifal: an orchestral quest (1993), Tristan und Isolde: an orchestral passion (1994), and Meistersinger: an orchestral tribute (2005). Many of these have been recorded on the Chandos label by the Royal Scottish National Orchestra conducted by Neeme Järvi.

De Vlieger's other works include an orchestration of the Vier ernste Gesänge of Johannes Brahms (2012), and an arrangement for percussion orchestra of the Pictures from an Exhibition by Modest Mussorgsky (1981). He has also written a Handbook for the orchestral percussion section (2003). He also carried out the orchestration of the Symphony No. 1 "The Lord of the Rings" by Johan de Meij (2000).

== Sources ==
- Schott Aktuel Jan/Feb 2012 (accessed 3 March 2012)
- Henk de Vlieger website (accessed 3 March 2012)
