= Ainulindalë =

Creation myth in J. R. R. Tolkien's fictional universe

The Ainulindalë (Quenya: [ˌai̯nuˈlindalɛ]; "Music of the Ainur") is the creation account in J. R. R. Tolkien's legendarium, published posthumously as the first part of The Silmarillion in 1977. The Ainulindalë sets out a central part of the cosmology of Tolkien's legendarium, telling how the Ainur, a class of angelic beings, perform a great music prefiguring the creation of the material universe, Eä, including Middle-Earth. The creator Eru Ilúvatar introduces the theme of the sentient races of Elves and Men, not anticipated by the Ainur, and gives physical being to the prefigured universe. Some of the Ainur decide to enter the physical world to prepare for their arrival, becoming the Valar and Maiar.

Tolkien wrote the initial version of the Ainulindalë between November 1919 and the spring of 1920 as "Music of the Ainur", and then completely rewrote it in 1930. He continued to make further revisions throughout his life. The early version was eventually published by his son Christopher in The Book of Lost Tales 1.

== Context ==
J. R. R. Tolkien was an English author and philologist of ancient Germanic languages, specialising in Old English, and a devout Roman Catholic; he spent much of his career as a professor at the University of Oxford. He is best known for his novels about his invented Middle-earth, The Hobbit and The Lord of the Rings. He described The Lord of the Rings as "a fundamentally religious and Catholic work", rich in Christian symbolism. (Note: Carpenter 2023, Letter 142 to Robert Murray, 2 December 1953) He however spent much of his life working on his Middle-earth legendarium, which was unpublished when he died in 1973. That large body of stories was edited after his death by his son Christopher, initially in 1977 as a single text, The Silmarillion, containing a version of the Ainulindalë. That was followed, between 1983 and 1996, by the twelve volumes of The History of Middle-earth, which revealed and annotated the many drafts of the overlapping stories of the legendarium, including other versions of the Ainulindalë.

Ainulindalë within The Silmarillion
Age	Silmarillion section	Description
Creation	Ainulindalë	The music of creation. Melkor strikes a discordant note but is unable to prevent Eru and the singing of the Valar from creating Arda.
———	Valaquenta	A description of the pantheon of the Valar
Years of the Lamps	Quenta Silmarillion	Melkor destroys the Two Lamps; Aman and Middle-earth are created; the Valar move to Aman.
Years of the Trees	Quenta Silmarillion	Yavanna creates the Two Trees of Valinor to restore light to the world; the Elves awaken; Melkor (Morgoth) steals the Silmarils, and Ungoliant kills the Two Trees of Valinor.
First Age	Quenta Silmarillion	Elves fight Morgoth in Beleriand; Eru intervenes, banishing Morgoth and destroying Beleriand.
Second Age	Akallabêth	The people of Númenor become too proud; their island is drowned.
Second Age/ Third Age	Of the Rings of Power and the Third Age	A description of the forging of the Rings of Power and the destruction of the One Ring, as described in The Lord of the Rings

== Synopsis ==
The Ainulindalë recounts the creation of Arda by the deity Eru Ilúvatar. Ilúvatar first creates the Ainur, who are described as "children of Ilúvatar's thought". They are taught the art of music, which becomes the subject of their immortal lives. Ilúvatar gives a musical theme to the Ainur, telling them to make of it a "Great Music", where they will all sing together in harmony, each offering their own interpretations of the theme.

The most powerful of the Ainur, Melkor, introduces music not in accordance with the theme of Ilúvatar, in an attempt to further increase his own glory. Although his "loud, and vain" music disrupts the harmony, Ilúvatar stands, smiles and raises his left hand to begin a new theme. When Melkor also spoils the second theme, Ilúvatar rises sternly and raises his right hand to begin a third. Melkor tries to corrupt this theme with the volume of his music, but it resists, incorporating his most triumphant notes into its own pattern. Amid the cacophony Ilúvatar rises again, his expression terrible, and raises both his hands to end the Music.

Ilúvatar chastises Melkor, saying that any attempt to diverge from his theme will ultimately serve to make the Music even more wonderful. He then shows the Ainur a vision of what the Great Music is: the idea of Eä, the universe. In the vision, the Ainur see the early history of Arda, the world, including the arrival of the Children of Ilúvatar, the Elves and the Men. Knowing the Ainur's desire for Eä to exist in reality, Ilúvatar speaks it into being, and invites any willing Ainur to go into Arda.

Some Ainur remain in the Timeless Halls with Ilúvatar, and others go into Arda as the Valar and Maiar. The Ainur, led by Manwë, begin to prepare for the arrival of the Children of Ilúvatar; Melkor repeatedly thwarts their preparations, desiring to rule Arda. Despite Melkor's disruptions, the Ainur's efforts eventually make the Earth habitable for Elves and Men.

== Writing ==
Tolkien initially intended the Ainulindalë ("The Music of the Ainur") to be part of The Book of Lost Tales, which he wrote in the 1910s and 1920s. In a letter, Tolkien stated that he had written the first version of the Ainulindalë between November 1918 and the spring of 1920, while he was working on the Oxford English Dictionary. (Note: Carpenter 2023, letter 257 to Christopher Bretherton, 16 July 1964)

The first draft of the story, written in pencil, does not vary significantly from the published version; future changes involved the addition of Manwë and Aulë. (Note: Tolkien 1984, pp. 88–90. Christopher Tolkien described the difference between the initial and final versions of the Ainulindalë.) The narrator in the earlier version is the elf Rúmil of Tirion and the language differs from that of the Silmarillion version. "Melkor" is spelt "Melko", and Ilúvatar weeps before he creates the third theme. At the end is a section about the Valar, which was later moved to the "Valaquenta".

Tolkien abandoned the Ainulindalë for many years. Although it did not appear in the "Sketch of the Mythology", in which he summarised his legendarium in 1926, the subject was briefly mentioned in "Annals of Valinor" and "Quenta Silmarillion". Tolkien rewrote "The Music of the Ainur" during the 1930s, leaving most of its storyline intact. (Note: Tolkien 1987, p. 155)

In 1946, while he was drafting The Lord of the Rings, Tolkien wrote a new version of the Ainulindalë of which only half a torn page survives. His legendarium then changed radically, so that Arda had always existed, the Sun existed when the world was formed, and the Moon was formed as a result of Melkor's destruction. Tolkien's concept of the Lamps of the Valar was abandoned in favour of a more coherent creation myth, with scientific elements. The idea of a spherical world was abandoned after a reader said that she preferred a flat one. (Note: Tolkien 1993, pp. 369–371)

In 1948 Tolkien began a new version, eliminating mentions of the Sun and the Moon, and introducing the concept that Ilúvatar created the world after the visions of the Ainur died away. In this version, which added several new details, the story is framed by a fictional narrator, the elf Pengoloð.

== Analysis ==
The Ainulindalë, written early in Tolkien's career, demonstrates the importance of music in his legendarium. According to John Gardner, "Music is the central symbol and the total myth of The Silmarillion, a symbol that becomes interchangeable with light (music's projection)." The scholar Verlyn Flieger, too, stresses the pervasive themes of music and light from the creation onwards.

"The Music of the Ainur", as it appears in The Book of Lost Tales, is based on Norse mythology. Like Hesiod's Theogony or the Gylfaginning in the Prose Edda, it answers questions of cosmogony, and its style has been compared to that of old Norse texts. Although the wording differs substantially, the Valar and the Æsir are alike in influencing the world and being influenced by their actions; Manwë has been compared to Odin in this context.

Despite the story's Norse pagan elements, such as the Ainur performing the creative work of Ilúvatar, other aspects of the Ainulindalë reflect Tolkien's Catholicism. His pre-Christian story has been called "Tolkien's Genesis essay"; according to another source, "The Biblical parallels evinced by the creation account of the Ainulindalë ... are inescapable."

The Tolkien scholar Marjorie Burns, who studied the different versions of the Ainulindalë, said that Tolkien increasingly Christianised the Valar and reduced the influence of Norse mythology in successive revisions. In the story, Tolkien expresses a global view of Christianity, with good and evil parallelling the stories in the Book of Genesis. As Tolkien has Elrond say in "The Council of Elrond" in The Lord of the Rings, "For nothing is evil in the beginning. Even Sauron was not so." (Note: Tolkien 1954a, book 2, ch. 2 "The Council of Elrond") In the Ainulindalë, Ilúvatar creates everything good; evil intrudes later. Though evil is brought about in the creation song by Melkor's pride, Ilúvatar incorporates it into the conclusion of his divine plan. The theme of evil being a perversion of good correlates to Christian theology regarding the existence of evil in a world made by a benevolent creator. Even Melkor's pride is Eru's will. As Eru himself declares "no theme may be played that hath not its uttermost source in me, nor can any alter the music in my despite".

== Reception and legacy ==
Although commentary on The Silmarillion has primarily focused on the work as a whole, the reaction to the Ainulindalë has been generally positive. Joseph Pearce, a Roman Catholic commentator, called it "the most important part of The Silmarillion" and said, "The myth of creation is perhaps the most significant and most beautiful of Tolkien's works." The scholar of humanities Brian Rosebury considered the Ainulindalë a success, with "appropriately 'scriptural'" prose. Several Jesuits have praised the story; James V. Schall said, "I have never read anything as beautiful as the first page of The Silmarillion" and Robert Murray said, "In all literature, from the formation of the sacred books of humanity, it is very difficult to find a comparable mythological story of creation by its beauty and imaginative power."

According to Fantasy Literature: A Core Collection and Reference Guide, "Every part of [The Silmarillion] benefits from the power and audacity of imaginative genius Tolkien and his brilliant style" and the Ainulindalë has "organ tones". Although Ralph C. Wood called it "one of the finest and most original of [Tolkien's] writings", the stylistic differences between this story and the rest of The Silmarillion have been the subject of debate.

The American opera singer Adam C. J. Klein composed an opera, Leithian, based on The Silmarillion, while the American contemporary classical composer Frank Felice wrote an orchestral version of the Ainulindalë. According to the Tolkien scholar Colin Duriez, the Ainulindalë may have inspired C. S. Lewis to have his fictional world of Narnia created from a song.
