= The Shaping of Middle-earth =

Fourth of the 12 volumes of 'The History of Middle-earth'

- Editor: Christopher Tolkien
- Author: J. R. R. Tolkien
- Language: English
- Series: The History of Middle-earth
- Release number: 4
- Subject: Tolkien's legendarium
- Genre: High fantasy Literary analysis
- Publisher: George Allen & Unwin (UK)
- Publication date: 1986
- Publication place: United Kingdom
- Media type: Print (hardback and paperback)
- Pages: 400 (paperback)
- ISBN: 978-0-261-10218-7
- Preceded by: The Lays of Beleriand
- Followed by: The Lost Road and Other Writings

The Shaping of Middle-earth – The Quenta, The Ambarkanta and The Annals (1986) is the fourth volume of Christopher Tolkien's 12-volume series The History of Middle-earth, in which he analysed the unpublished manuscripts of his father J. R. R. Tolkien.

== Book ==
=== Contents ===
Navigable diagram of Tolkien's legendarium. Volume IV, The Shaping of Middle-earth, sketches out his mythology and contains the more developed account, Quenta Noldorinwa.

In The Shaping of Middle-earth the gradual transition from the "primitive" legendarium of The Book of Lost Tales to what would become The Silmarillion is described, and it contains a text which could be seen as the first "Silmarillion": the "Sketch of the Mythology".

Three other parts are the Ambarkanta or "Shape of the World", a collection of maps and diagrams of the world described by Tolkien; and the Annals of Valinor and Beleriand, chronological works which started out as timelines but gradually turned into full narratives.

1. Prose fragments following the Lost Tales — brief, uncompleted texts which continue on from The Book of Lost Tales
2. The earliest "Silmarillion" — also referred to as the "Sketch of the Mythology", this is the start of the Silmarillion proper
3. The Quenta Noldorinwa — a further developed version of the "Sketch", the first full narrative since the legends and the only instance where Tolkien completed it. It is notable for having the latest full narrative of the story of Tuor and the fall of the hidden Elven city of Gondolin.
4. The first "Silmarillion" map — a reproduction of the first map of Beleriand
5. The Ambarkanta — cosmological essays, maps, and diagrams
6. The earliest Annals of Valinor
7. The earliest Annals of Beleriand

The Annals of Valinor and Annals of Beleriand show the earliest outline of the chronology of the First Age as envisaged in the early 1930s.

The next volume in the series, The Lost Road and Other Writings (1987), outlined revisions to both texts made c. 1937 as "The Later Annals of Valinor" and "The Later Annals of Beleriand".

=== Inscription ===
There is an inscription in the Fëanorian characters (Tengwar, an alphabet Tolkien has devised for High-Elves) in the first pages of every History of Middle-earth volume, written by Christopher Tolkien and describing the contents of the book. The inscription in Book IV reads: "Herein are the Quenta Noldorinwa, the History of the Gnomes, the Ambarkanta or Shape of the World by Rúmil, the Annals of Valinor and the Annals of Beleriand by Pengolod, the Wise of Gondolin with maps of the world in the Elder Days and translations made by Ælfwine the Mariner of England into the tongue of his own land".

== Reception ==
Reviewing The Shaping of Middle-earth in Mythlore, Nancy-Lou Patterson admired Tolkien's prose and was especially impressed by Tolkien's artwork, as seen in the illustrations of the cosmology of Arda in the Ambarkanta.

Tom Shippey comments in The Road to Middle-earth that the manuscripts of Shaping and the other early volumes reveal Tolkien's tendency to "[fiddle]" about, or in Tolkien's own phrase in The Notion Club Papers "to be for ever niggling [Shippey's italics], altering, refining, wavering, according to your linguistic mood and to your changes in taste". Shippey describes the effect as "at best confusing, at worst irritating".

== See also ==
- Quenta Silmarillion

== Sources ==
- Shippey, Tom (2005) [1982]. The Road to Middle-Earth: How J. R. R. Tolkien Created a New Mythology (Third ed.). HarperCollins. ISBN 978-0-261-10275-0.
