= Bradford Lee Eden =

American librarian and Tolkien scholar (born 1960)

Bradford Lee Eden (born 1960) is an American librarian and musicologist, best known as a Tolkien scholar.

== Biography ==
Bradford Lee Eden was born in 1960. He has a degree in religion from the University of North Texas and a Ph.D. in Medieval Musicology from Indiana State University. He was Dean of Library Services at Valparaiso University, Indiana. He has written several books on librarianship.

Eden is a Tolkien scholar. He edits the open access Journal of Tolkien Research. He has edited two collections of scholarly essays on Tolkien themes, written several research papers, and contributed six articles to the 2006 J. R. R. Tolkien Encyclopedia, including on Elves and Music in Middle-earth.

He was nominated for a 2011 Mythopoeic scholarship award for Inkling Studies.

== Reception ==
=== Middle-earth Minstrel ===
Emily A. Moniz, writing in Mythlore, calls Eden's edited collection of essays Middle-earth Minstrel "strong right out of the gate", with interesting and useful contributions, some of them "truly excellent", on such Tolkien research topics as linguistics, pedagogy, music, and alliterative poetry. She found David Bratman's essay on music in Middle-earth a "marvelous survey" of a vast subject, spoilt by repeated complaints about Howard Shore's music for The Lord of the Rings film series: she wished that "the editorial pen ... had been slightly more ruthless."

=== The Hobbit and Tolkien's Mythology ===
David L. Emerson, reviewing the edited collection The Hobbit and Tolkien's Mythology for Mythlore, commented that while it was worth reading and contained "many noteworthy essays", it had been edited rather too timidly. Thus, Emerson writes, the editor should have asked authors to cut down on digressions, and should have assisted authors whose first language was not English to select the correct words when terms were being misused. Further, the pairs of juxtaposed essays by different authors contained too much repetition that "a more aggressive editor" could have fixed by discussion with the authors. The collection suffered, too, from only having access to the first of three Peter Jackson films of The Hobbit; in Emerson's view, the editor should have waited until all were available.

== Works ==
=== Books ===
- (2010) Middle-Earth Minstrel: Essays on Music in Tolkien (edited). McFarland.
- (2014) The Hobbit and Tolkien's Mythology: Essays on Revisions and Influences (edited). McFarland.

=== Essays ===
- (2006) eleven essays inc. 'Elves' and 'Music in Middle-earth' in The J. R. R. Tolkien Encyclopedia
- (2018) "Music, Time, and Light in the Works of J.R.R. Tolkien and Verlyn Flieger: A Reflection"
- (2019) "Sub-Creation by Any Other Name: The Artist and God in the Early Twentieth Century"
