= The Lays of Beleriand =

Third of the 12 volumes of 'The History of Middle-earth'

- Front cover titled "Fingolfin's Challenge" by John Howe
- Editor: Christopher Tolkien
- Author: J. R. R. Tolkien
- Series: The History of Middle-earth
- Release number: 3
- Subject: Tolkien's legendarium
- Genre: High fantasy Literary analysis Poetry
- Publisher: George Allen & Unwin (UK)
- Publication date: 1985
- Publication place: United Kingdom
- Media type: Print (hardback & paperback)
- Pages: 400 (paperback)
- ISBN: 978-0-2611-0226-2
- Preceded by: The Book of Lost Tales
- Followed by: The Shaping of Middle-earth

The Lays of Beleriand, published in 1985, is the third volume of Christopher Tolkien's 12-volume book series, The History of Middle-earth, in which he analyses the unpublished manuscripts of his father J. R. R. Tolkien.

== Book ==
=== Contents ===
The book contains the long heroic lays or lyric poetry from Tolkien's legendarium, omitted from The Silmarillion: these are The Lay of the Children of Húrin about the saga of Túrin Turambar, and The Lay of Leithian (also called Release from Bondage) which tells the Tale of Beren and Lúthien. Although Tolkien abandoned them without completing either of them, they are both long enough to occupy many stanzas, each of which can last for over ten pages. The first poem is in alliterative verse, and the second is in rhyming couplets. Both exist in two versions.

In addition to these two poems, the book contains three short, soon-abandoned alliterative poems, The Flight of the Noldoli from Valinor, The Lay of Eärendel, and The Lay of the Fall of Gondolin.

The first versions of the long lays fit chronologically in with Tolkien's earliest writings, as recounted in The Book of Lost Tales, but the later version of The Lay of Leithian is contemporary with the writing of The Lord of the Rings.

Navigable diagram of Tolkien's legendarium. The Lays of Beleriand were written early in his life.

The book is split into these main sections:

1. The Lay of the Children of Húrin, the tale of Túrin in 2276 lines of verse.
  1. First version
  2. Second version
2. Poems Early Abandoned:
  1. The Flight of the Noldoli
  2. Fragment of an alliterative Lay of Earendel
  3. The Lay of the Fall of Gondolin
3. The Lay of Leithian (unfinished poem: the Tale of Beren and Lúthien in verse (over 4200 lines of iambic tetrameters, in rhyming couplets):
  1. The Gest of Beren son of Barahir and Lúthien the Fay called Tinúviel the Nightingale or the Lay of Leithian - Release from Bondage (split into fourteen cantos)
  2. Unwritten cantos
  3. Appendix: Commentary by C. S. Lewis

These are followed by:

4. The Lay of Leithian Recommenced

In the book Christopher Tolkien mentions a third Túrin poem, this time in rhyming couplets and incomplete. It is called The Children of Húrin and is only 170 lines long (compared to the 2276 lines of the first of the alliterative poems); that poem, however, has been omitted from the book.

=== Inscription ===
There is an inscription in the Fëanorian characters (Tengwar, an alphabet Tolkien has devised for High-Elves) in the first pages of every History of Middle-earth volume, written by Christopher Tolkien and describing the contents of the book. The inscription in Book III reads: "In the first part of this Book is given the Lay of the Children of Húrin by John Ronald Reuel Tolkien, in which is set forth in part the Tale of Túrin. In the second part is the Lay of Leithian, which is the Gest of Beren and Lúthien as far as the encounter of Beren with Carcharoth at the gate of Angband".

== Reception and legacy ==
David Langford reviewed The Lays of Beleriand for White Dwarf #70, stating that "A few gleams of humour come from C. S. Lewis's 15-page critique of an early draft: for the rest, poor old Tolkien lies entombed and fossilized in earnest commentary, like a set text for Eng Lit."

The fantasy novelist Suzannah Rowntree wrote that the book is a favourite of hers, and the only volume of the twelve that she had read in full and "[kept] coming back to for pleasure". In her view, "the book's main attraction is Part III, 'The Lay of Leithian'". She describes this as "a red-blooded, grand poem, written in a richly ornamented style bordering (in places) on the baroque. At worst this seems a little clumsy; at best it fits the lavish, heroic story and setting." She comments that Lewis "obviously enjoyed the poem hugely," going so far as to invent scholars Peabody and Pumpernickel who comment on what Lewis pretends is an ancient text.

Reviews of The Lays of Beleriand have been written by:

- Helen McNabb in Vector 128, 1985
- Ray Thompson in Fantasy Review, April 1986
- Don D'Ammassa in Science Fiction Chronicle, #80, May 1986
- Thomas A. Easton [as by Tom Easton] in Analog Science Fiction/Science Fact, August 1986
- Andy Sawyer in Paperback Inferno, #69, 1987
- Eugenio Sánchez Arrate in Gigamesh, 12, January 1998 (in Spanish)

The album Oath Bound by the Austrian band Summoning, known for its Tolkien-themed lyrics, contains several songs with lyrics derived from the Lay of Leithian.
