= Johan de Meij =

Dutch conductor, trombonist and composer

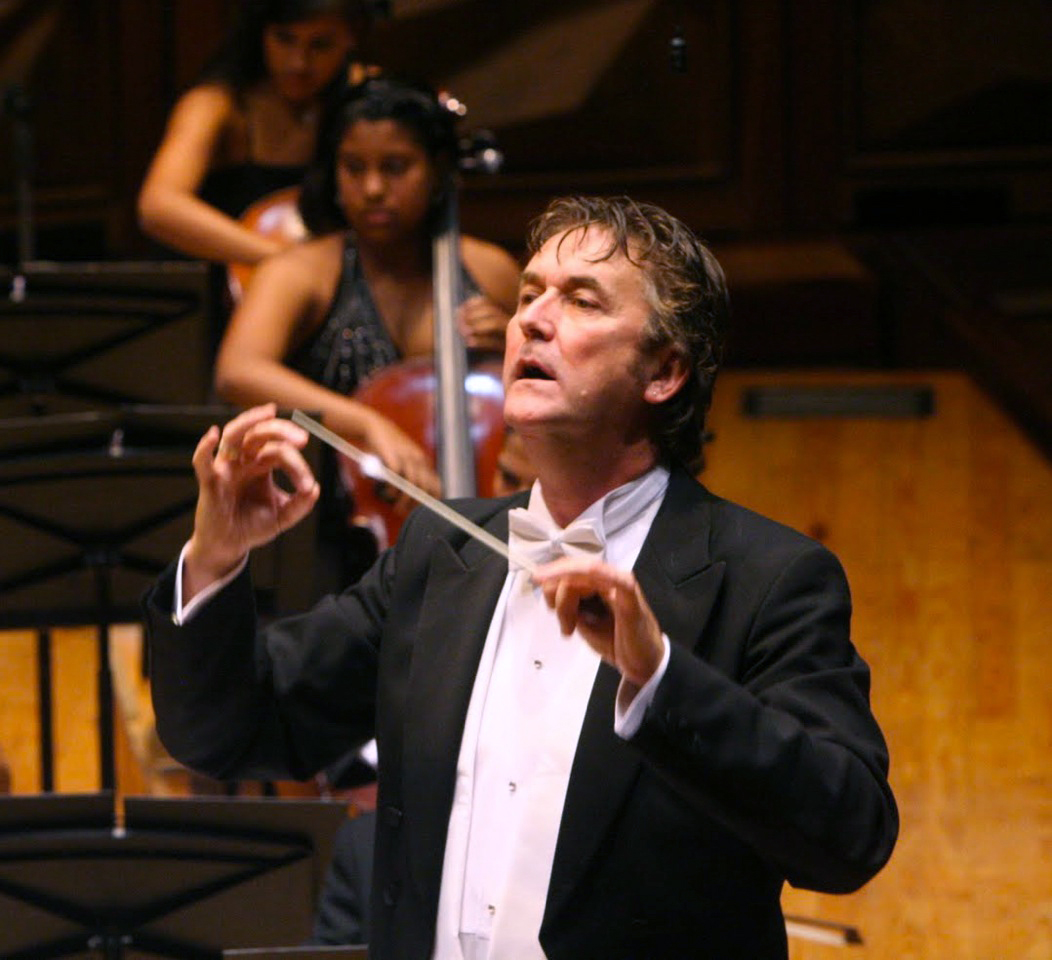
Johan de Meij

Johannes Abraham "Johan" de Meij (Dutch pronunciation: [ˈjoːɦɑn də ˈmɛi]; born November 23, 1953 in Voorburg) is a Dutch conductor, trombonist, and composer, best known for his Symphony No. 1 for wind ensemble, nicknamed The Lord of the Rings symphony.

== Biography ==
Johan de Meij received his musical training at the Royal Conservatory of The Hague, where he studied trombone and conducting. His Symphony No. 1 "The Lord of the Rings", first performed in 1988, received the Sudler Composition Award in 1989, and has been recorded by ensembles including The London Symphony Orchestra, The North Netherlands Orchestra, The Nagoya Philharmonic Orchestra, and The Amsterdam Wind Orchestra.

Before turning exclusively to composing and conducting, Johan de Meij played trombone and euphonium; he performed with major ensembles in The Netherlands. He is the principal guest conductor of the New York Wind Symphony and the Kyushu Wind Orchestra in Fukuoka, Japan; he is a regular guest conductor of the Simón Bolívar Youth Wind Orchestra in Caracas, Venezuela, part of the Venezuelan educational system El Sistema. He is founder and CEO of the publishing company Amstel Music, which he established in 1989. When not traveling, de Meij divides his time between Hudson Valley and Manhattan with his wife Dyan.

== Works ==
- 1979 Patchwork for brass sextet
- 1984-1988 Symphony No. 1 "The Lord of the Rings"
- 1988 Loch Ness - A Scottish Fantasy
- 1989 Aquarium opus 5
- 1993 Symphony No. 2 "The Big Apple" (A New York Symphony)
- 1995 Polish Christmas Music- Part 1 (based on the Polish Christmas carols Pokłon Jezusowi; Mizerna, cicha; Anioł pasterzom mówił; Gdy śliczna Panna and Jam jest dudka)
- 1995 Jazz Suite No.2 (of Dmitri Shostakovich) Classical transcription for symphonic/fanfare band
- 1996 T-Bone Concerto for trombone and concert band
- 1997 Continental Overture
- 1998 La Quintessenza
- 2000 Casanova for cello solo and symphonic wind orchestra
- 2002 The Venetian Collection
- Klezmer Classics for wind orchestra
- The Wind in the Willows
- 2005 Extreme Make-over (Testpiece for the European Brass Band Contest 2005, Groningen-NL)
- 2005 Ceremonial Fanfare
- 2006 Symphony No. 3 "Planet Earth"
- 2006 Windy City Overture - commissioned by the Northshore Concert Band
- 2007 Canticles for Bass Trombone and Wind Orchestra
- 2007 Festive Hymn
- 2008 Dutch Masters Suite
- 2009? Evolution
- 2010 Spring - Overture for Wind Orchestra
- 2010 At Kitty O'Sheas (Irish Folk Song Suite)
- 2011 Cloud Factory
- 2011 "Songs from the Catskills"
- 2011? Sinfonietta no. 1 (for brass band)
- 2012 UFO Concerto for Euphonium
- 2012 Extreme Beethoven - commissioned by The World Music Contest (WMC) in Kerkrade
- 2013 Symphony No. 4 "Sinfonie der Lieder" (to texts by Friedrich Rückert, Heinrich Heine, and Hugo von Hofmannsthal)
- 2013 Basilica sacra
- 2013 Summer
- 2014 Downtown divertimento
- Madurodam
- Pentagram
- R.O.K Navy Fanfare
- 2019 Symphony No. 5 "Return to Middle Earth"
- 2022 The Painted Bird
