= Ainur in Middle-earth =

Divine race from J. R. R. Tolkien's legendarium

The Ainur (sing. Ainu) are the immortal spirits, Valar and Maiar, existing before the Creation in J. R. R. Tolkien's fictional universe. These were the first beings made of the thought of Eru Ilúvatar. They were able to sing such beautiful music that the world was created from it. (Note: Tolkien 1977, ""Ainulindale")

Scholars have likened the Valar to the Æsir, the gods of Asgard, while the wizard Gandalf, one of the Maiar, resembles Odin the wanderer. Others have seen them as like angels in Christianity, intermediaries between the creator, Eru Ilúvatar, and the created cosmos. The Tolkien scholar Tom Shippey relates the Valar to luck and fate in Middle-earth, writing that people do see a patterning force in the world; but while it could be Providence, or in Middle-earth the Valar, people still have free will and have to trust to their own courage.

== History ==
=== Origins ===
Before the Creation, Eru Ilúvatar made the Ainur or "holy ones". The Universe was created through the "Music of the Ainur" or Ainulindalë, music sung by the Ainur in response to themes introduced by Eru. This universe, the song endowed with existence by Eru, was called Eä in Quenya. The Earth was called Arda. Those of the Ainur who felt concern for the Creation entered it, and became the Valar and the Maiar, the guardians of Creation. (Note: Tolkien 1977, "Valaquenta")

=== Valar ===
The Valar included both good and evil characters. The Vala Melkor claimed the Earth for himself. His brother, Manwë, and several other Valar decided to confront him. Melkor fell into evil and became known as Morgoth, the dark enemy. The conflict between the Valar and Morgoth marred much of the world. According to The Silmarillion, the Valar and Maiar – with the aid of the Vala Tulkas, who entered the Creation last—succeeded in exiling Morgoth into the Void, though his maleficent influence remained ingrained in the fabric of the world.

=== Maiar ===
Like the Valar, the Maiar included both good and evil characters. The Maiar were more numerous than the Valar, but less powerful individually. Among the good were the Istari or Wizards, sent to Middle-earth. (Note: Tolkien 1980, "The Istari") Among the evil were the Balrogs or fire-demons, who were some of the Dark Lord Morgoth's most powerful servants, (Note: Tolkien 1977, ch. 3 "Of the Coming of the Elves and the Captivity of Melkor") and Sauron, the Dark Lord of the Third Age, a Maia who had been corrupted by Morgoth.

== Analysis ==
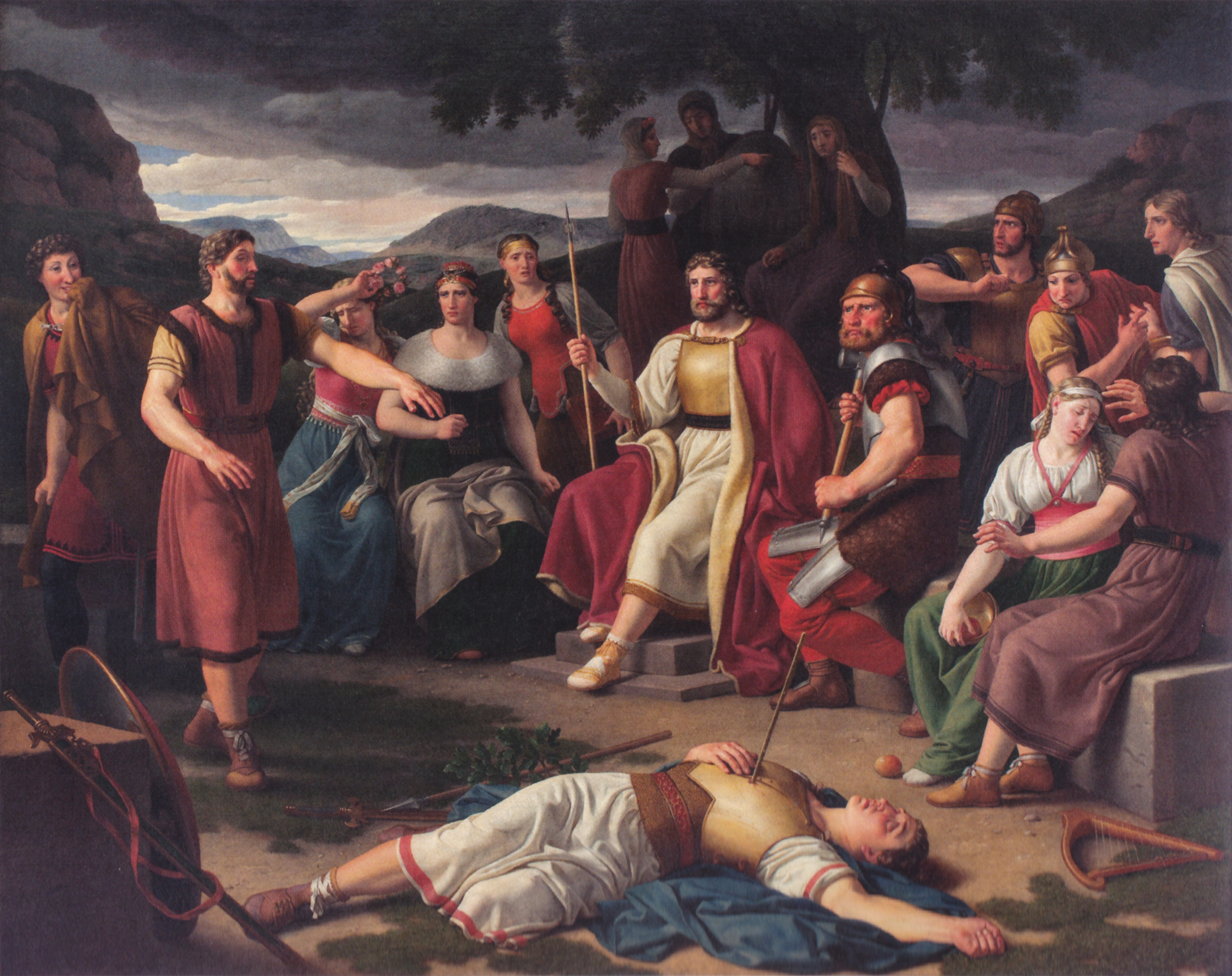
Some critics have noted the similarity of the Valar to the Æsir, the strong and combative Norse gods of Asgard. Painting by Christoffer Wilhelm Eckersberg, 1817

=== Norse Æsir ===
Critics such as John Garth have noted that the Valar resemble the Æsir, the gods of Asgard. Thor, for example, physically the strongest of the gods, can be seen both in Oromë, who fights the monsters of Melkor, and in Tulkas, the strongest of the Valar. Manwë, the head of the Valar, has some similarities to Odin, the "Allfather", while the wizard Gandalf, one of the Maiar, resembles Odin the wanderer.

=== Christian angels ===
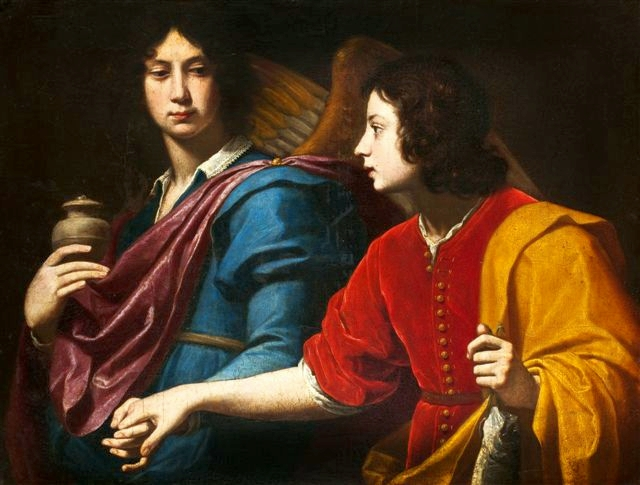
Other scholars have likened the Valar to Christian angels, intermediaries between the creator and the created world. Painting by Lorenzo Lippi, c. 1645

The theologian Ralph C. Wood describes the Valar and Maiar as being what Christians "would call angels", intermediaries between the creator, named as Eru Ilúvatar in the Silmarillion, and the created cosmos. Like angels, they have free will and can therefore rebel against him.

Matthew Dickerson, writing in the J.R.R. Tolkien Encyclopedia, calls the Valar the "Powers of Middle-earth", noting that they are not incarnated, and quoting Tolkien scholar Verlyn Flieger's description of their original role as "to shape and light the world". Dickerson writes that while Tolkien presents the Valar like pagan gods, he imagined them more like angels, and notes that scholars have compared the devotion of Tolkien's Elves to Varda/Elbereth as resembling the Roman Catholic veneration of Mary the mother of Jesus. Dickerson states that the key point is that the Valar were "not to be worshipped". He argues that as a result, the Valar's knowledge and power had to be limited, and they could make mistakes and moral errors. Their bringing of the Elves to Valinor meant that the Elves were "gathered at their knee", a moral error as it suggested something close to worship.

=== Between pagan and Christian ===
The Tolkien scholar Marjorie Burns notes that Tolkien wrote that to be acceptable to modern readers, mythology had to be brought up to "our grade of assessment". In her view, between his early The Book of Lost Tales and the published book The Silmarillion, the Valar had greatly changed, "civilized and modernized", and this had made the Valar "slowly and slightly" more Christian. For example, the Valar now had "spouses" rather than "wives", and their unions were spiritual, not physical. All the same, she writes, readers still perceive the Valar "as a pantheon", serving as gods.

Judith Kollmann wrote in Mythlore that "the Valar are clearly the gods of Scandinavia, Greece, and Rome, and, as well, the angels and archangels of Judeo-Christianity."

Tolkien's classes of immortal beings and possible Christian and Pagan influences
| Middle-earth | Christianity | Classical Mythology | Norse Mythology |
|---|---|---|---|
| Eru Ilúvatar | The one God | — | — |
| Ainur (Valar, Maiar) of Valinor | Archangels, Angels of Heaven | Pantheon of Olympian Gods | Æsir of Asgard and Vanir of Vanaheim |
| Manwë, a Vala | Michael the Archangel, an Angel | Zeus, one of the Olympian Gods | Odin, one of the Æsir |
| Morgoth, a fallen Vala; Sauron, a fallen Maia | The Devil, a fallen Angel | — | Loki, a fallen member of the Æsir |
| Tom Bombadil, Goldberry, Elves, etc | — | Fauns, Satyrs, Dryads, Naiads, etc | Hulder, Nixies, etc of Scandinavian folklore |

=== Maiar compared to Valar ===
Grant C. Sterling, writing in Mythlore, states that the Maiar resemble the Valar in being unable to die, but differ in being able to choose to incarnate fully in forms such as men's bodies. This means that, like Gandalf and the Balrogs, they can be killed. He notes that Sauron's inability ever to take bodily form again after his defeat could be the result of having given his power to the One Ring, but that the fate of killed Maiar remains unclear. Jonathan Evans, writing in The J. R. R. Tolkien Encyclopedia, calls the Maiar semidivine spirits, and notes that each one is linked with one of the Valar. He states that they have "perpetual importance in the cosmic order", noting the statement in the Silmarillion that their joy "is as an air that they breathe in all their days, whose thought flows in a tide untroubled from the heights to the deeps." (Note: Tolkien 1977, ""Quenta Silmarillion", 10. "Of the Sindar") Evans notes, too, that Arien and Tilion are central in Tolkien's myth of the Sun and Moon.

=== Luck or providence ===
The Tolkien scholar Tom Shippey discusses the connection between the Valar and "luck" on Middle-earth, writing that as in real life "People ... do in sober reality recognise a strongly patterning force in the world around them", but that while this may be due to "Providence or the Valar", the force "does not affect free will and cannot be distinguished from the ordinary operations of nature", nor reduce the necessity of "heroic endeavour". He notes that this exactly matches the Old English view of luck and personal courage, as in Beowulf's "Wyrd often spares the man who isn't doomed, as long as his courage holds." The Tolkien critic Paul H. Kocher similarly discusses the role of providence, in the form of the intentions of the Valar or of the creator Eru Ilúvatar, in Bilbo's finding of the One Ring and Frodo's bearing of it; as Gandalf says, they were "meant" to have it, though it remained their choice to co-operate with this purpose.
