= David Bratman =

American librarian and Tolkien scholar (1957–2026)

David Stephen Bratman (31 March 1957 – 9 November 2026) was an American librarian and Tolkien scholar, who edited several journals devoted to that topic. He also worked as a classical music reviewer.

== Early life and career ==
David Bratman was born on 31 March 1957 in Chicago to Robert Bratman, a physician, and his wife Nancy, an editor. He was one of four sons in the family. He was brought up in Cleveland, Ohio, and then in California. He was educated at the University of California, Berkeley, and took his M.L.S. at the University of Washington, then worked as a librarian at libraries including Stanford University, San Jose State University, and Santa Clara University, converting card catalogues to digital format.

Bratman contributed to Tolkien scholarship since 1977, including 13 entries for the J. R. R. Tolkien Encyclopedia, and a chapter in Wiley-Blackwell's A Companion to J. R. R. Tolkien.

He edited the journal Mythprint for the Mythopoeic Society from 1980 to 1995, served as a Steward of the society, and edited and contributed to the journal Tolkien Studies and to Mythlore, a journal on the Inklings. Starting in the early 21st century, he also contributed music reviews to San Francisco Classical Voice.

With his friend Seth Goldberg (1952–1997), Bratman ran the Hugo Awards for science fiction and fantasy at the 1993, 1994, and 1996 Worldcons.

== Personal life and death ==
Bratman was married to Bernadette Phillips, whom he met at a science fiction convention in 1987. He died at his home in Sunnyvale, California, on 9 November 2026, at the age of 69.

== Books ==
Bratman published an annotated edition of Charles Williams's The Masques of Amen House in 2000. In 2023, he published Gifted Amateurs and Other Essays, a collection of his writings on Tolkien, the Inklings, and the works of other fantasy authors.
