= Geology of Middle-earth =

Geology of J. R. R. Tolkien's fictional world

The geology of Middle-earth is the fictional geology implied by the maps in J. R. R. Tolkien's fiction, especially The Lord of the Rings, with features such as rivers, volcanoes, and mountain ranges that may suggest tectonic activity. The arrangement of some of the mountains however implies an unusual or "practically impossible" geomorphology. Issues include rivers running parallel to mountain ranges, lack of watersheds between drainage basins, an inland river delta flowing into another river. Tolkien's oddly right-angled mountain ranges have been parodied in The Harvard Lampoon's 1969 book Bored of the Rings.

== Plate tectonics ==
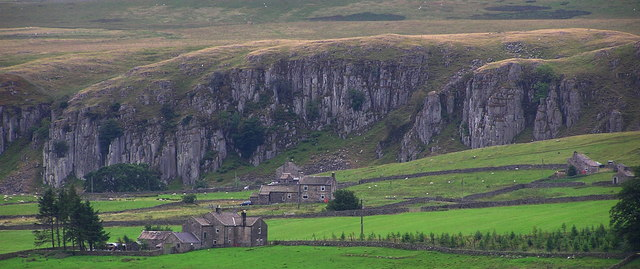
Many of Middle-earth's geological features match those of Earth. For example, Moria's West Gate resembles a sill like the Whin Sill (pictured) in the north of England.

The geologists Margaret M. Howes in 1967, Robert C. Reynolds in 1974, and then William Sarjeant in 1992, used the information from the illustrations, maps, and text of J. R. R. Tolkien's fiction, especially The Lord of the Rings, to create a conjectural reconstruction of Middle-earth's geology.

Howes attempted to correlate the events in the history of Middle-earth in the "Elder Days" with periods of glaciation and interglacials in Earth's geological history.

Reynolds identified four tectonic plates: the Rhovanion Plate on the north of Middle-earth; the Eriador Plate on the west of the continent; and two southern plates, the Harad Plate and the Mordor Plate. The River Anduin flowed through an aulacogen, an inactive rift zone. A tectonic basin occupied the area north of the White Mountains and south of the Emyn Muil. The land of Rohan was a craton, an old and stable geological region.

Sarjeant stated that plate tectonics had evolved substantially since 1974. He increased the number of tectonic plates to six, the two oldest being the Eriador and the Forlindon Plates. They collided to build the Ered Luin mountain range, the Forlindon Plate being mostly subducted and destroyed in the process. The Eriador Plate collided with the Rhovanion and Harad Plates, creating the Misty Mountains and the White Mountains, all three plates joining each other next to the stable craton of Rohan. Similarly, the Eriador and Rhovanion Plates collided with the Forodwaith Plate, raising the Ered Mithrin and forming another junction of three plates. Sarjeant suggests that Mount Gundabad could possibly be a block of tough rocks exactly where the three plates meet. Finally, the Mordor Plate collided with the Harad and Rhovanion Plates, tearing the crust to form the Anduin's rift valley, which is subsiding.

== Geological features ==
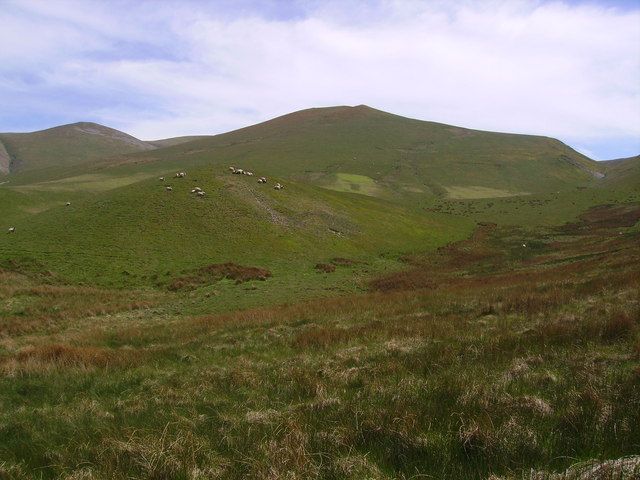
The grassy hills of Fornost on the North Downs could be drumlins, like these in the Lake District.

Sarjeant identifies Mount Doom, Dol Guldur, Orthanc, and Erebor as isolated volcanoes; all but Mount Doom were inactive by the end of the Third Age. He comments that many other geological inferences are possible, such as that the West Gate of Moria could have been in a large volcanic sill, an intrusion of lava between layers of country rock. He concludes that Middle-earth's geology is much like that of the Earth.

The geographers Ian Smalley and Sally Bijl propose that Arnor, and in particular the Shire, was covered by the yellow-brown wind-blown dust sediment loess. The northern part of the region would have been glaciated; when the ice retreated, elongated mounds of drift material, drumlins, would have remained as the grassy hills of Fornost on the North Downs.

== Geomorphological issues ==
Issues with the geomorphology of Middle-earth, identified by Alex Acks

The geologist Alex Acks, writing on Tor.com in 2017, outlines the mismatch between Tolkien's maps and the geomorphological processes of plate tectonics which shape the Earth's continents and mountain ranges. Mountains form mainly next to subduction zones where oceanic crust slides under continental crust, or where continents collide and crumple. Stretching of continental crust, by upwelling of magma, creates broken horst and graben landforms. Acks comments that none of these create right-angle junctions in mountain ranges, such as are seen around Mordor and at both ends of the Misty Mountains on Tolkien's maps. Isolated volcanoes far inland, like Mount Doom, are possible but unlikely: most such volcanoes are islands and occur in roughly straight-line groups as the crust moves across a hotspot in Earth's mantle.

Detail of the map in The Harvard Lampoon's 1969 book Bored of the Rings, parodying Tolkien's geomorphology with "The Square Valley Between the Mounts"

Acks identifies a further issue, with Tolkien's rivers. The Earth's major rivers each drain a raised area of land, forming a drainage basin; the river in the basin takes water and sediment down to the sea, or looked at the other way, branches regularly into smaller and smaller streams that lead up into the hills. A river like the Anduin, on the other hand, has very few branches: it runs more or less as a single large stream for hundreds of miles, and parallel to the Misty Mountain range, rather than directly downhill and away from it. Worse, one of its few tributaries, the Entwash, branches out into an inland river delta, a basically flat place where a river ends, usually by the sea; but the Anduin goes on flowing past this spot, downhill. Acks excuses another oddity, namely that the Anduin cuts through a gap (between the White Mountains of Gondor and the Ephel Duath of Mordor); this is unusual but can happen, as when the Colorado River cuts across the mountainous Basin and Range Province: the river was there before the mountains, and cut its way down through the rock faster than the mountains grew upwards.

Acks comments that the inland Sea of Rhûn seems to be in the bottom of a drainage basin. Again, this can happen; but there must be a watershed, high ground separating it from neighbouring drainage basins, in particular that of the Anduin. In Tolkien's map, the rivers of Mirkwood run eastwards towards the Sea of Rhûn, propelled by an invisible slope from invisible Mirkwood hills. The cartographer Karen Wynn Fonstad draws her map of the Dwarves' route from the Anduin to the Forest River completely flat, with only small local topographic features on the way.

Hazel Gibson, for the European Geosciences Union, writes that Serjeant had to take "some very large leaps" to assemble a picture of the geology and geomorphology consistent with Tolkien's text. She concurs with Acks that "Several of the mountain ranges and individual mountains on the map make absolutely no sense." Real mountain chains can meet almost at a right angle, but, she writes, "you have to work really hard to find them." Mordor is the most egregious instance, in Gibson's opinion: a "square plain fenced by mountains at right angles to each other – it's practically impossible."

The Harvard Lampoon's 1969 book Bored of the Rings parodies Tolkien's geomorphology with a double-page map by William S. Donnell. It depicts places such as "The Square Valley Between the Mounts", "The Mulsanne Straight" (a straight-line mountain range), and "The Intermittent Mountains".

== Sources ==
- Acks, Alex (1 August 2017a). "Tolkien's Map and The Messed Up Mountains of Middle-earth". Tor.com. Archived from the original on 1 August 2017.
- Acks, Alex (10 October 2017b). "Tolkien's Map and the Perplexing River Systems of Middle-earth". Tor.com. Archived from the original on 11 October 2017.
- Beard, Henry (1969). Bored of the Rings: a Parody of J.R.R. Tolkien's The Lord of the Rings. New York: Signet (New American Library). ISBN 978-0-451-13730-2.
- Fonstad, Karen Wynn (1991). The Atlas of Middle-earth. Boston: Houghton Mifflin Harcourt. ISBN 0-618-12699-6.
- Gibson, Hazel (29 September 2023). "'Far over the Misty Mountains cold, to dungeons deep and caverns old': the geology of The Lord of the Rings". GeoLog. European Geosciences Union.
- Howes, Margaret M. (1967). "The Elder Ages and the later glaciations of the Pleistocene Epoch". Tolkien Journal. 3 (2 (8)): 3–21.
- Reynolds, Robert C. (1974). "The geomorphology of Middle-earth". The Swansea Geographer. 11: 67–71.
- Sarjeant, William Antony Swithin (1995). "The Geology of Middle-earth". Mallorn. 33: 334–339.
- Smalley, Ian; Bijl, Sally. "Drumlins in Arnor: Glacial Geomorphology in Middle Earth". Scribd.
