= Tolkien: Maker of Middle-earth =

Book by Catherine Mcilwaine

- Cover of first edition, showing Tolkien's painting "Bilbo Comes to the Huts of the Raft-Elves"
- Author: Catherine McIlwaine
- Illustrator: J. R. R. Tolkien
- Language: English
- Subject: Tolkien's legendarium
- Genre: Art
- Published: 1 June 2018
- Publisher: The Bodleian Library
- Publication place: United Kingdom
- Media type: Print (hardback)
- Pages: 416
- ISBN: 978-1851244850

Tolkien: Maker of Middle-earth is a 2018 art book exploring images of the artwork, illustrations, maps, letters and manuscripts of J. R. R. Tolkien. The book was written by Catherine McIlwaine, Tolkien archivist at the Bodleian Library, Oxford. It was timed to coincide with an exhibition of the same name, also curated by McIlwaine.

The book documents Tolkien's creative processes behind his Middle-earth books with essays by Tolkien scholars and a catalogue of his artworks, each image accompanied by a descriptive and historical text. With some 300 illustrations, mainly in double-page spreads of image and text, the book draws on the collection at the Bodleian Library, Marquette University, and private collections.

The book and exhibition have been widely admired by commentators. In 2019, McIlwaine won a World Fantasy Special Award—Professional for curating the exhibition, and both a Hugo Award for Best Art Book and a Tolkien Society Award for the book.

== Context ==
The philologist and author J. R. R. Tolkien prepared illustrations for his Middle-earth fantasy books, facsimile artefacts, more or less "picturesque" maps, calligraphy, and sketches and paintings from life. Some of his artworks combined several of these elements to support his fiction. From an early age, his artwork was a key element of his creativity.

Catherine McIlwaine has worked as the Tolkien archivist at the Bodleian Library in Oxford since 2003.

== Work ==
=== Publication history ===
The 416-page book was written by McIlwaine. It was published in a large format, 23.5 cm × 25.4 cm (9 1/4 in × 10 in) hardcover by the Bodleian in 2018, and in a smaller paperback format later the same year. A hardcover German edition was published by Stuttgart Hobbit Presse Klett-Cotta, also in 2018.

=== Exhibition ===
The book's appearance was timed to coincide with an exhibition of the same name, also curated by McIlwaine. The exhibition ran from 1 June 2018 (the publication date of the book) to 28 October 2018. It presented some 200 of the book's images of Tolkien's life and work. The exhibition visited the Morgan Library & Museum in New York in 2019.

=== Contents ===
"Bilbo woke up with the sun in his eyes": a double-page spread from the book, showing the combination of detailed text, Tolkien's artwork, and a spacious layout

The book is divided into two parts. The first is a series of essays on key aspects of Tolkien's Middle-earth oeuvre. There is a brief biography of Tolkien by McIlwaine, and a chapter by John Garth on how the Inklings, a literary group that included C. S. Lewis, influenced Tolkien. Verlyn Flieger describes Tolkien's concept of faerie, referencing works such as On Fairy-Stories and Smith of Wootton Major as well as his Middle-earth books. Carl F. Hostetter introduces Tolkien's invented Elvish languages, Quenya and Sindarin. Tom Shippey comments on Tolkien's creative use of Norse mythology, and the northern ethos of courage without hope of victory, citing Beowulf and the Poetic Edda's Lay of Fafnir, to suit his own taste, faith, and knowledge of philology. Finally, Wayne Hammond and Christina Scull introduce Tolkien's visual art, arguing that his artwork was as thorough as his writing.

The second part is a catalogue of the exhibition, divided into chapters covering Tolkien's letters, his childhood, student days, inventiveness, his long effort on The Silmarillion myths, his work at home, The Hobbit, The Lord of the Rings, and his maps of Middle-earth. It provides some 300 illustrations, mainly in double-page spreads of image and text. Some are from the collection at the Bodleian Library; others are from the archive at Marquette University and from private collections.

=== Illustrations ===
The book has some 300 colour illustrations. Many illustrations occupy a full page, usually with a description facing it to form a double-page spread on a single item. Each image or group of similar images has an exhibition-like title and summary, stating the image's date, materials used, size, exhibition date and number, appearances in published literature (whether by Tolkien or others), and the manuscript number. There follows a description of the image in text.

== Reception ==
=== Book ===
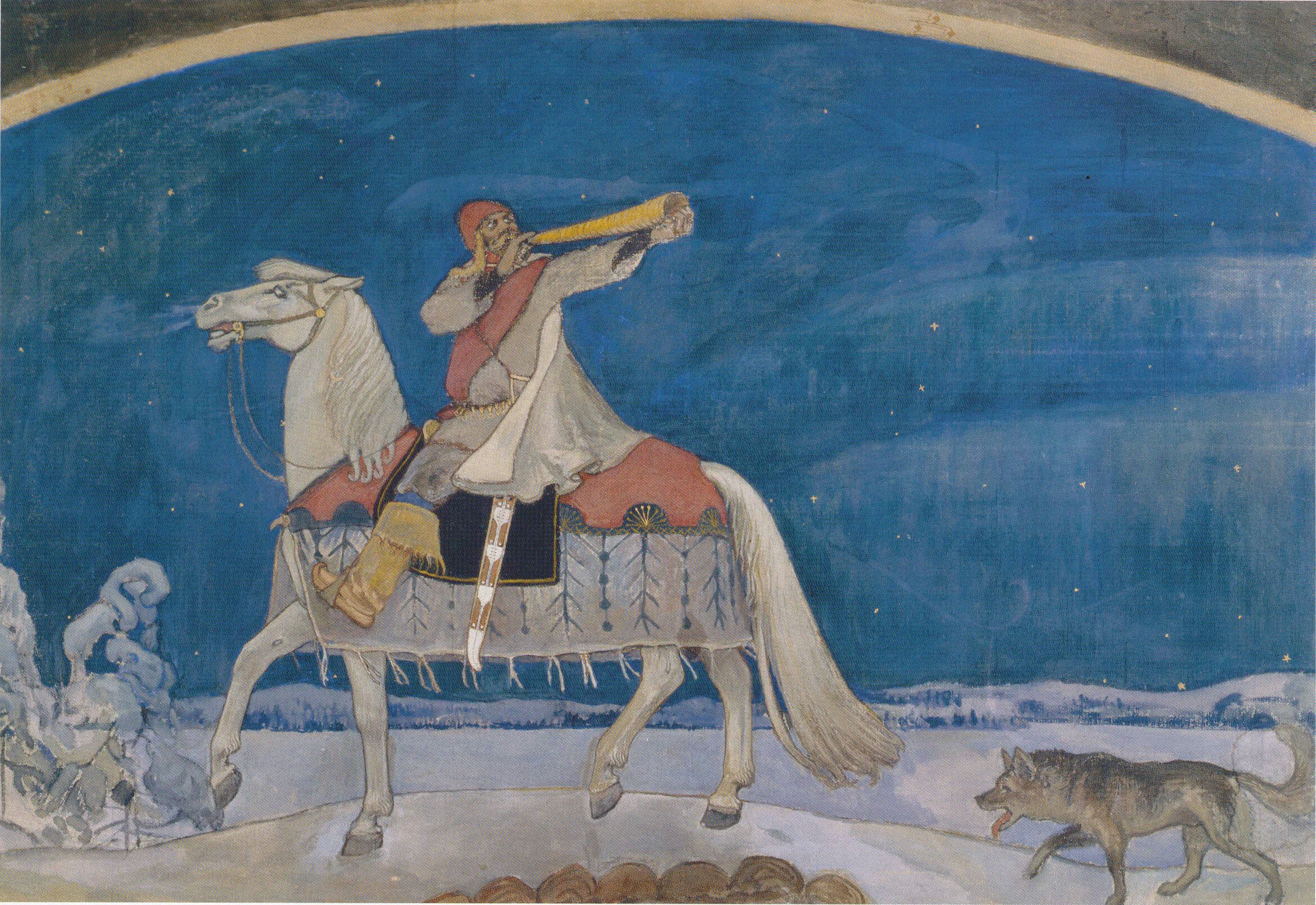
Tolkien's first prose fiction was the 1914 The Story of Kullervo, inspired by the Finnish Kalevala. Painting Kullervo Rides to War by Akseli Gallen-Kallela, 1901

Fafnir, the Nordic journal of science fiction and fantasy, wrote that McIlwaine is an authoritative editor who had assembled "an excellent textual and visual compendium". It noted some repetition between the essays and the catalogue, but admired McIlwaine's correlation of Tolkien's artwork with events in his life and his work on the three major Middle-earth books, The Hobbit, The Lord of the Rings, and The Silmarillion.

The British Fantasy Society found the book "incredibly impressive" and the level of detail "astounding". It stated that it surpassed earlier attempts at documenting Tolkien's creative process, with the inclusion of many unpublished personal photographs and private papers.

=== Exhibition ===
The National Review described the exhibition as "the most thorough collection in years of Tolkien's wide-ranging creative gifts". It notes the starting-point in 1914 where the 22-year-old Tolkien, about to go to the Western Front, spent his Christmas holiday writing the Kalevala-inspired The Story of Kullervo. The next year, one of his paintings depicted an Elvish city, Kor, and a poem next to the painting spoke of Valinor, the Undying Lands of The Silmarillion. The review praised McIlwaine for the exhibition's "tremendous vitality" achieved by putting Tolkien in "the full context of his life".

The Claremont Review of Books stated that, seeing the English countryside after visiting the exhibition, "the significance of the most easily overlooked part of the Bodleian exhibition becomes clear: the family and personal mementos of a life lived in an England that was even then disappearing before Tolkien's eyes". In its view, the book "demonstrated in glorious detail" many items of Tolkien's art not shown the exhibition, along with essays "that will become new standards, rich in detail while elegant in economy of prose".

The Guardian's Samantha Shannon reported McIlwaine as saying she wanted exhibition visitors "to leave with the impression of the whole man and his work – not just Tolkien as the maker of Middle-earth, but as a scholar, a young professor, a father of four children". Shannon wrote that McIlwaine had succeeded in this: "I am comforted to have glimpsed the man behind the myth, and I am more inspired than ever by the scope of his creation."

The Daily Telegraph called the exhibition "tremendous ... an immersive experience". It noted that the Bodleian had assembled materials from the Marquette University collection as well as its own larger body of Tolkien papers.

Christianity Today reported that the exhibition was "nearly comprehensive" but had one "glaring omission": "any mention of the author's devout, lifelong Christian faith". It mentions Michael Ward's comment that Tolkien's faith is not obvious in Middle-earth, unlike his friend C. S. Lewis's Narnia, and concludes that "Only if we recognize Tolkien's deep Christian faith can we hope to understand the life and work of the 'Maker of Middle-earth'".

The Norwegian American stated that the exhibition had record-breaking ticket sales on its visit to New York's Morgan Library & Museum. This contributed to a "Tolkien mania" in the city, coinciding with the arrival of the 2019 biographical film Tolkien.

=== Awards ===
In 2019, McIlwaine won a World Fantasy Special Award—Professional for curating the Bodleian's Tolkien exhibition. Also in 2019, the book won McIlwaine a Hugo Award for Best Art Book and a Tolkien Society Award.

== See also ==
- J. R. R. Tolkien: Artist & Illustrator – a 1995 book by Wayne Hammond and Christine Scull
