= J. R. R. Tolkien: Artist and Illustrator =

Book by Wayne Hammond and Christina Scull

- Cover of first edition, featuring Tolkien's painting of Taniquetil
- Author: Wayne G. Hammond and Christina Scull
- Illustrator: J. R. R. Tolkien
- Language: English
- Subject: J. R. R. Tolkien's artwork
- Genre: Reference
- Publisher: HarperCollins (UK) and Houghton Mifflin (US)
- Publication date: 1995
- Publication place: United Kingdom and United States
- Media type: Hardcover (HarperCollins paperback, UK, 1998; Houghton Mifflin paperback, US, 2000)
- Pages: 208
- ISBN: 978-0-261-10322-1
- OCLC: 34533659

J. R. R. Tolkien: Artist and Illustrator is a collection of paintings (mostly watercolour) and drawings by J. R. R. Tolkien for his stories, published posthumously in 1995. The book was edited by Wayne G. Hammond and Christina Scull. It won the 1996 Mythopoeic Scholarship Award for Inklings Studies. The nature and importance of Tolkien's artwork is discussed.

== Book ==
=== Context ===
J. R. R. Tolkien was an artist in pictures as well as in words. Though he often remarked that he had no talent for drawing, his art has charmed readers and has been exhibited to large and appreciative audiences. In fact, his talent was far more than he admitted, and his sense of design was natural and keen. Portraits are conspicuously absent from his work.

=== Synopsis ===
The book explores Tolkien's art at length, from his childhood paintings and drawings to his final sketches. It reproduces 200 examples of his artwork. At its heart are his illustrations for his books, especially The Hobbit and The Lord of the Rings. Also examined are the pictures Tolkien made for his children (notably in his The Father Christmas Letters and Mr. Bliss), his expressive calligraphy, his love of decoration, and his contributions to the typography and design of his books. There is an appendix on Tolkien's calligraphy.

== Reception ==
The book won the 1996 Mythopoeic Scholarship Award for Inklings Studies.

It was well received by scholars and critics. The Tolkien Library called the book a significant contribution to understanding Tolkien's life and art, "a full book's worth even without the artwork".

Raymond Lister, reviewing the book for the literary journal VII, writes that it is uncommon for writers also to be illustrators, with instances like William Blake and Beatrix Potter. He states that Tolkien rightly considered himself an amateur, though his work gained professional polish over the years. In Lister's view, Tolkien was at his best when illustrating his own "romances", with fictional landscapes populated by dragons; and when working for children. In his view, Hammond and Scull have researched widely, as shown by the notes, and written "a good book ... extensively and beautifully illustrated ... its text ... an excellent example of how scholarship and clear prose—so often mutually exclusive—should be combined".

== See also ==
- Illustrating Tolkien – Tolkien's requirements on illustrations for his work, and artists' responses
- Tolkien: Maker of Middle-earth – a 2018 book on Tolkien's art by Catherine McIlwaine

== Sources ==
- Hammond, Wayne G.; Scull, Christina (1995). J.R.R. Tolkien: Artist and Illustrator. London: HarperCollins Publishers. ISBN 978-0-261-10322-1.
