= The Atlas of Pern =

1984 book by Karen Wynn Fonstad

- Trade paperback edition cover
- Author: Karen Wynn Fonstad
- Illustrator: Karen Wynn Fonstad
- Cover artist: Karen Wynn Fonstad (James Harris design)
- Language: English
- Series: Dragonriders of Pern companion
- Genre: Science fiction; atlas
- Publisher: Del Rey Books
- Publication date: November 1984
- Publication place: United States
- Media type: Print (paperback & hardcover)
- Pages: xvii+169pp (all eds.)
- ISBN: 0-345-31434-4
- Dewey Decimal: 813.54 F733a

The Atlas of Pern by Karen Wynn Fonstad is an authorized companion book to the science fiction Dragonriders of Pern series by Anne McCaffrey. It was completed in 1984 based on the first seven Pern novels and collaboration with McCaffrey.

The Atlas is a large-format book comprising regional maps, chronologies for the seven published novels, local maps and drawings of "Hall, Hold, and Weyr", thematic maps on a world scale, and notes. The Notes are page references to the canon, a list of reference works, and an index of place names.

McCaffrey wrote in her "Welcome" that she had received in November 1983 "the first of Karen's renditions of my Pern, which rendered clearly what had been partially obscured by a myopic mind's eye: this is Pern! ... all lifted from the depths of my imagination and captured by Karen's draftsmanship and geographical expertise ...".

Fonstad had earned a Master's degree in Geography, specializing in cartography, from the University of Oklahoma, and worked as Director of Cartographic Services at the University of Wisconsin–Oshkosh before "retirement" to raising children and writing atlases of fictional worlds. Pern was her second, following The Atlas of Middle-earth (Houghton-Mifflin, 1981) based on the fantasy fiction of J. R. R. Tolkien. Her acknowledgments for The Atlas of Pern include "my husband, Todd, associate professor of geography", the UW Oshkosh Department of Geography, and several UWO faculty members.

== See also ==
- The Dragonlover's Guide to Pern
