= Catherine McIlwaine =

Tolkien scholar

Catherine McIlwaine is a Tolkien scholar, who was the Tolkien archivist at the Bodleian Library, Oxford, for more than 20 years. She won a World Fantasy Special Award—Professional for curating an exhibition of Tolkien's artwork at the Bodleian, and a Hugo Award and a Tolkien Society Award for the accompanying book, Tolkien: Maker of Middle-earth.

== Life ==
=== Education ===
Catherine McIlwaine earned her BA in classical civilization at the University of Sheffield in 1989. She completed her MA in archival administration at the University of Liverpool in 1993.

=== Tolkien scholar ===
In 2003 she became Tolkien archivist at the Bodleian Libraries of the University of Oxford and remained in that position until 2025. In 2018, McIlwaine curated a major exhibition of Tolkien's artwork at the Bodleian, Tolkien: Maker of Middle-earth, accompanied by a book of the same name that analyses Tolkien's achievement and illustrates the full range of the types of artwork that he created. Denis Bridoux, reviewing the book for Tolkien Studies, calls it "a mammoth endeavor and ... a tremendous achievement." He describes it as "an invaluable document". He notes that it is scholarly, while the companion book Treasures is aesthetic; he calls the two complementary, and recommends newcomers to buy both. Andoni Cossio, writing in Fafnir, describes McIlwaine as "an authoritative editor". Hugh Crago, reviewing for the Children's Literature Association, calls the book "well organized [and] well written".

== Honours and distinctions ==
In 2019, McIlwaine won a World Fantasy Special Award—Professional for curating the Bodleian's Tolkien exhibition. Also in 2019, she won a Hugo Award for Best Art Book and a Tolkien Society Award for Tolkien, Maker of Middle-earth.

== Works ==
Author

- McIlwaine, Catherine (2018). Tolkien: Maker of Middle-earth. Oxford: Bodleian Library. ISBN 978-1851244850.
- McIlwaine, Catherine (2018). Tolkien: Treasures. Oxford: Bodleian Library. ISBN 978-1-85124-496-6.

Editor

- Ovenden, Richard; McIlwaine, Catherine, eds. (2022). The Great Tales Never End: Essays in Memory of Christopher Tolkien. Bodleian Library Publishing. ISBN 978-1-8512-4565-9.
