= Bored of the Rings =

Parody novel

- First edition cover by Michael K. Frith, which echoes Barbara Remington's Ballantine covers
- Author: Henry Beard; Douglas Kenney
- Illustrator: William S. Donnell (map)
- Cover artist: Michael K. Frith (1969 ed.); Douglas Carrel (2001 ed.)
- Subject: The Lord of the Rings
- Genre: Fantasy satire
- Publisher: Signet (New American Library)
- Publication date: 1969
- Publication place: United States
- Pages: 160
- ISBN: 978-0-575-07362-3

Bored of the Rings is a 1969 parody of J. R. R. Tolkien's The Lord of the Rings. This short novel was written by Henry Beard and Douglas Kenney, who later founded National Lampoon. It was published in 1969 by Signet for The Harvard Lampoon, and, unusually for a parody, has remained in print for over 50 years. It has been translated into at least twelve languages.

The parody steps through The Lord of the Rings, in turn mocking the prologue, the map, and the main text. The text combines slapstick humor with deliberately inappropriate use of brand names.

== Book ==
=== Approach ===
Detail of the book's map, parodying Tolkien's hand-drawn maps in The Lord of the Rings

The parody closely follows the outline of The Lord of the Rings, lampooning the prologue and map of Middle-earth; its main text is a short satirical summary of Tolkien's plot. The witty text combines slapstick humour and deliberately inappropriate use of brand names. For example, the carbonated beverages Moxie and Pepsi replace Merry and Pippin. Tom Bombadil appears as "Tim Benzedrine", a stereotypical hippie married to "Hashberry" (Goldberry). Her name alludes to Haight-Ashbury, a district of San Francisco nicknamed Hashbury for its hippie counterculture at that time. Saruman is satirised as Serutan, a laxative, who lives in a "mighty fortress" with "pastel pink-and-blue walls" and a "pale-lavender moat crossed by a bright-green drawbridge", giving access to an amusement park for tourists. Minas Tirith appears as Minas Troney, designed by Beltelephon the senile. Other characters include the boggies (Hobbits) Dildo Bugger of Bug End and Frito Bugger (Bilbo and Frodo Baggins), Goddam (Gollum), and Arrowroot, son of Arrowshirt (Aragorn, son of Arathorn).

Novelist David Barnett, in a retrospective for The Guardian, notes that the characters also break the fourth wall at times. Near the beginning, Frito rolls his eyes and observes that "it was going to be a long epic." The fifth chapter, "Some Monsters," concludes as the characters "set out with Frito along the rising gorge that led to the next chapter."

=== Main text ===
The main text broadly follows the plot of The Lord of the Rings, its ten chapters roughly corresponding to key chapters of Tolkien's novel.

1. The parody starts with "It's My Party and I'll Snub Who I Want To", mocking the opening of I:1 "A Long-expected Party" and Bilbo's leaving party. The Boggies are excited at the prospect of free food, especially the drooling and senile Haf Gangree, who has retired on the takings from his thriving blackmail business.
2. "Three's Company, Four's a Bore" parodies I:3 "Three is Company". Goodgulf Grayteeth (Gandalf) translates the writing on the Ring, beginning "'This Ring, no other, is made by the elves, / Who'd pawn their own mother to grab it themselves.' 'Shakestoor, (Note: A Stoor is a type of Hobbit.) it isn't, said Frito'".
3. "Indigestion at the Sign of the Goode Eats" derides I:9 "At the Sign of the Prancing Pony" in the village of Whee in Wheeland, "a small and swampy region populated mostly by star-nosed moles".
4. "Finders Keepers, Finders Weepers" is a parody of II:1 "Many Meetings" and II:2 "The Council of Elrond". Orlon (Elrond) and the Lady Lycra sit at the head of the table in dazzling whiteness: "Dead they looked, and yet it was not so". An ancient lament of the Auld Elves runs "A Unicef clearasil / Gibberish 'n' drivel ... Sing hey nonny nembutal", mocking the Sindarin hymn A Elbereth Gilthoniel.
5. "Some Monsters" echoes II:3 "A Journey in the Dark" and II:5 "The Bridge of Khazad-Dum". In a parody of the Fellowship's encounter with the Watcher in the Water, the chapter includes: "'Aiyee!' shouted Legolam (Legolas). 'A Thesaurus!' 'Maim!' roared the monster. 'Mutilate, mangle, crush. See HARM.'" They enter the dread Andrea Doria (Moria), and fight the ballhog (Balrog). "'Dulce et decorum', said Bromosel (Boromir), hacking at the bridge." Goodgulf dies. The chapter continues with a parody of II:6 "Lothlórien". They meet Lord Cellophane and Lady Lavalier of Lornadoon, land of the Gone Elves (Celeborn and Galadriel). "'You have much to fear', said Cellophane. 'You leave at dawn', said Lavalier." The travellers are given magic cloaks "that blended in with any background, either green grass, green trees, green rocks, or green sky". Spam (Sam Gamgee) gets a gift of insect repellent.
6. "The Riders of Roi-Tan" parodies III:2 "The Riders of Rohan". "Vere ist you going und vat are you doing here" asks the leading Rider from the back of her bull merino sheep. The text continues, mocking III:3 "The Uruk-Hai"; "'Okay, okay', sobbed Pepsi. 'Untie me and I'll draw you a map.' Goulash (Grishnakh) agreed to this in his greedy haste..." Pepsi and Moxie escape into the forest, for III:4 "Treebeard", where they meet the terrifying Birdseye, Lord of the Vee-Ates, the jolly green giant, who makes puns about vegetables (lettuce go...). Meanwhile, echoing III:5 "The White Rider", Arrowroot, Legolam, and Gimlet (Gimli) meet the reborn Goodgulf who is wearing new clothes from a boutique in Lornadoon (Lothlórien).
7. "Serutan Spelled Backwards is Mud" parodies chapters including III:7 "Helm's Deep" and III:10 "The Voice of Saruman". The travellers "stare with apprehension at the motionless wheels and tarpaulined exhibits" of the fairground of Serutanland. Birdseye and his vegetables arrive and bombard Serutan's fortress with giant suicide scallions and kamikaze kumquats. "The ramparts were littered with chopped parsley, diced onion, and grated carrots."
8. "Schlob's Lair and Other Mountain Resorts" mocks much of Book IV as Frito and Spam meet Goddam, cross the "mucky pools" of the Ngaio Marsh (the Dead Marshes), pass the black chimneys of Chikken Noodul (Minas Morgul), "the dread company town that stood across from Minas Troney", and climb the Sol Hurok, the great cliffs of Fordor (Mordor). They enter Schlob's (Shelob the giant spider's) lair. Frito slashes at Schlob's "sharp red fingernails" with his sword Tweezer, "only managing to chip the enamel". "As the ravenous creature closed in, Frito's last memory was of Spam frantically schpritzing insect repellent into Schlob's bottomless gullet".
9. "Minas Troney in the Soup" parodies V:4 "The Siege of Gondor" and V:6 "The Battle of the Pelennor Fields". The boggies are dressed in armour; Goodgulf "wore only an old deep-sea diver's suit of stoutest latex. ... In his hand he carried an ancient and trusty weapon, called by the elves a Browning semi-automatic".
10. "Be it Ever so Horrid" briefly mocks Frodo's homecoming, ignoring the tales of VI:8 "The Scouring of the Shire" and VI:9 "The Grey Havens": "he walked directly to his cozy fire and slumped in the chair. He began to muse upon the years of delicious boredom that lay ahead. Perhaps he would take up Scrabble".

=== Other materials ===
Aside from the main text, the book includes:

- Inside cover reviews from a variety of supposed sources such as "This book ... tremor ... Manichean guilt ... existential ... pleonastic ... redundancy ..." by a Mr Orlando di Biscuit of the publication Hobnob, and concluding with a quotation by a Professor Hawley Smoot in the publication Our Loosely Enforced Libel Laws.
- A list of other books in the Matzoh "series" including The Matzoh of Casterbridge and Matzoh Dick, with the rider "Unfortunately all of these books have been completely sold out".
- A double-page map by William S. Donnell, with places such as "The Square Valley Between the Mounts", (Note: The geologist Alex Acks describes Tolkien's maps as "messed up", noting that mountain ranges do not form right angles, nor do major rivers run for long distances parallel to mountain ranges.) "The Intermittent Mountains", the lands of "Fördør" and "Gönad", "The Big Wide River", "The Legendary Drillingrigs", and the "Lümbar" region.
- A text that purports to be a salacious sample from the book, in which an elf-maiden sets about seducing Frito to get the Ring.
- A "Foreword" and "Prologue" that mock the equivalent sections in The Lord of the Rings. David Barnett writes that "it's refreshing to see a book that lays the cards on the table in its opening salvo: 'This book is predominantly concerned with making money and from its pages a reader may learn much about the character and literary integrity of the authors. Of Boggies, however, he will discover next to nothing.'"
- A laudatory back cover review, written at Harvard, possibly by the authors themselves.

=== Artwork ===
The Signet first edition cover, a parody of the 1965 Ballantine paperback covers by Barbara Remington, (Note: See The Lord of the Rings § Ballantine.) was drawn by Muppets designer Michael K. Frith. Current editions have different artwork by Douglas Carrel, since the paperback cover art for Lord of the Rings prevalent in the 1960s, then famous, is now obscure. William S. Donnell drew the "parody map" of Lower Middle Earth.

== Reception ==
Goodgulf sat dejectedly before the obstinate portal, mumbling spells.
"Pismo", he intoned, striking the door with his wand. "Bitumen. Lazlo. Clayton-Bulwer."
Save for a hollow thud, the door made no sign of opening.
"It looks grim", said Arrowroot.
Suddenly the Wizard sprang to his feet. "The knob", he cried...

— II:5, "Some Monsters"

The Tolkien scholar David Bratman, writing in Mythlore, quotes an extended passage from the book in which Frito, Spam Gangree (Sam Gamgee), and Goddam jostle on the edge of the "Black Hole" (a tar pit), commenting "Those parodists wrought better than they knew". He explains that Tolkien, in his many drafts, came very close to "inadvertently writing the parody version of his own novel", though in the end he managed to avoid that, in Bratman's view, remarkably completely.

The author Mike Sacks, quoting the book's opening lines, writes that the book has had the distinction, rare for a parody, of being continuously in print for over 40 years, was one of the earliest parodies of "a modern, popular bestseller", and has inspired many pop culture writers including those who worked on Saturday Night Live and The Onion.

Leah Schnelbach, on the science fiction and fantasy site Tor.com, writes that the book is full of "interesting comedic thoughts ... stuffed in under all the silliness". In her view, it takes "an easy, marketable hook" and creates "a cutting satire of shallow consumerism and the good-old-fashioned American road trip". She remarks, too, on the rescue of the Boggies Frito and Spam by the eagle Gwahno. The eagle "is efficient to the point of rudeness, yelling at them to fasten their seatbelts, snapping at them to use the barf bags if necessary, and complaining about running behind schedule: he's the encapsulation of everything wrong with air travel". Schnelbach writes that after a picaresque journey through American kitsch, "they end firmly in the angry, efficiency-at-all-costs Jet Age. And thus this ridiculous parody becomes a commentary on the perils of modernism, just like Lord of the Rings itself."

In a 2011 essay, David Barnett decides that, with its characters reinvented as "a fairly grimy, down-at-heel set," "Bored of the Rings sits somewhere between the classic US parody magazine Mad and National Lampoon's signature movie Animal House – cruder than the former but not quite as rude as the latter." Barnett finds the book "very funny, albeit perhaps less sophisticated than more modern parodies. But Kenney and Beard's respect and affection for the source material shines through. There's a gag you can appreciate on pretty much every page, and many of them will actually make you laugh out loud. Take Dildo's first encounter with the Gollum-alike: 'He would have finished Goddam off then and there, but pity stayed his hand. It's a pity I've run out of bullets, he thought.'"

== Translations ==
The book has been translated into several languages, often with a title that puns on The Lord of the Rings:

Translations
| Language | Title | Meaning | Sounds like | Translator | Year |
|---|---|---|---|---|---|
| Czech | Za pár prstenů | "For a few rings" | Pán prstenů | Richard Podaný | 2002 |
| Estonian | Sõrmuste lisand | "Addition of the Rings" | Sõrmuste isand | Janno Buschmann | 2002 |
| Finnish | Loru sorbusten herrasta | "A rhyme about the lord of Sorbus" | Taru sormusten herrasta | Pekka Markkula | 1983, 2002 |
| French | Lord of the Ringards | "Lord of the Has-beens" | Lord of the Rings (Fr: Le Seigneur des anneaux) | Francis Ledoux; Daniel Lauzon | 2002 |
| German | Der Herr der Augenringe | "Lord of the Eye Rings" | Der Herr der Ringe | Margaret Carroux | 1983 |
| Hungarian | Gyűrűkúra | "Ring Course", as in rejuvenation course | Gyűrűk Ura | András Gáspár | 1991 |
| Italian | Il signore dei tranelli | "Lord of the Traps" | Il Signore degli Anelli | Vittoria Alliata di Villafranca | 2002 |
| Norwegian Bokmål | Ringenes dårskap | "The Folly of the Rings" | "Ringens brorskap" ("The Fellowship of the Ring") | Lars Finsen | 2004 |
| Polish | Nuda Pierścieni | "Boredom of the Rings" | Władca Pierścieni | Zbigniew A. Królicki | 1997, 2001 |
| Portuguese (Brazil) | O Fedor dos Anéis | "The Stink of the Rings" | O Senhor dos Anéis | Antônio Rocha; Alberto Monjardim | 2004 |
| Russian | Пластилин Колец (Plastilin Kolets) | "Plasticine of the Rings" | Властелин колец (Vlastelin kolets) | Sergey Ilyin | 2002 |
| Spanish | El Sopor de los Anillos | "The Doze of the Rings" | El Señor de los Anillos | Jordi Zamarreño Rodea, Salvador Tintoré Fernández | 2001 |
| Swedish | Härsken på ringen | "Rancid at the ring" | Härskarringen | Lena Karlin | 2003 |

== Derivative works ==
Delta 4's Bored of the Rings is a 1985 text adventure game inspired by the book, but it was not directly based on it.

In 2013, an audio version was produced by Orion Audiobooks, narrated by Rupert Degas.

== See also ==
- A Futile and Stupid Gesture, a biographical film about the book's authors
- Dmitry Puchkov, an author who intentionally mistranslated Lord of the Rings
- Hordes of the Things and ElvenQuest, radio parodies from the BBC
- The Last Ringbearer by Kirill Eskov, Lord of the Rings told from Mordor's perspective
- The Soddit, a parody of The Hobbit

== Sources ==
- Beard, Henry (1969). Bored of the Rings: a Parody of J.R.R. Tolkien's The Lord of the Rings. New York: Signet (New American Library). ISBN 978-0-451-13730-2.
