= Rocket-Bye Baby =

- Title card
- Directed by: Chuck Jones
- Story by: Michael Maltese
- Starring: Daws Butler (uncredited); June Foray (uncredited)
- Narrated by: Daws Butler (opening, uncredited)
- Edited by: Treg Brown
- Music by: Milt Franklyn (arrangement)
- Animation by: Ken Harris; Abe Levitow; Ben Washam; Harry Love (special animation effects)
- Layouts by: Ernie Nordli
- Backgrounds by: Phillip DeGuard
- Color process: Technicolor
- Production company: Warner Bros. Cartoons
- Distributed by: Warner Bros. Pictures
- Release date: August 4, 1956 (USA)
- Running time: 7 minutes
- Language: English

Rocket-Bye Baby is a 1956 Warner Bros. animated cartoon in the Merrie Melodies series, directed by Chuck Jones. The short was released on August 4, 1956.

The Michael Maltese story follows the adventures of a baby from Mars who ends up on Earth after the planets pass close to each other and create a 'cosmic force'. It was Warner Brothers' take on the borderline hysteria surrounding UFOs in the 1950s.

The cartoon is one of a very few Warner Bros. animated short films of the era that did not use Mel Blanc's voice talent. Instead, Daws Butler, famous for the voices of Yogi Bear, Huckleberry Hound and other characters in the Hanna-Barbera oeuvre, and June Foray, most famous as the voice of Rocky the Flying Squirrel, provided the vocal content of the short.

The title is a play on the nursery rhyme "Rock-a-bye Baby".

== Plot ==
The short begins with a vignette showing the planets Mars and Earth; the narrator (voiced by Butler) explains that, in the summer of 1954, the planets came so close to each other that "a cosmic force was disturbed" and a baby destined for Earth is diverted to Mars, and vice versa. This is depicted via two comet-like bodies colliding, then assuming paths distinctly different from their original ones. The transit of the green one is followed as it flies through Earth's atmosphere, above hundreds of homes with strange-looking TV antennas, ultimately arriving inside a hospital.

Joseph Wilbur (voiced by Butler) is waiting with other anxious, heavily smoking fathers in the hospital waiting room. Finally, an announcement (voiced by Foray) comes over the PA system informing Joseph that he may see his baby. Excited, he presses against the nursery window glass as his baby is rolled in. The baby becomes visible, but is soon revealed with his head being green; as he jumps up, his head has two antennae that spark and make Morse-code style beeps. In response, Joseph says, "Somebody goofed!" before fainting.

The next scene opens in a suburban home, in which Joseph is arguing with his wife, Martha (voiced by Foray). He is pleading his case to keep the baby in the house. She counters that the baby needs sunshine and fresh air. Joseph then takes the infant out in a stroller, fearful of being seen. While he is not looking, the baby startles Joseph by crawling up onto the stroller's hood and beeping; then he scampers onto a wall and communicates with a bee sitting on a nearby flower.

We next see Joseph in the house, saying to dispassionate Martha that they "Can't have him talking to any strange bee he might meet on the street". Subsequently, he is pushing the stroller along when an elderly woman (voiced by Foray) begins to dote on the baby, picking him up and noting that he is "such a healthy green baby, too". As it begins to dawn on her that something is strange, he beeps his antennae, uses them to take her glasses and dons them, amplifying his eyes. Horrified, Joseph hurries the baby back home. The lady, unusually calm, uses a pitch pipe she pulls from her purse to find the right note before letting out two bloodcurdling screams.

In the next scene, Martha is beginning to worry about the baby. He is doing the family's income taxes, spelling out Einstein's Mass–energy equivalence with letter blocks, and creating a Tinkertoy (named "Stinkertoy" in the cartoon) model of the (fictional) illudium molecule made famous in the Marvin the Martian cartoons. The scene also includes a model of the Solar System made from a basketball, Christmas ornaments hung from the ceiling with string, and a graph on a chalkboard titled "Hurricane Possibilities for Year 1985". There are also plans not only to build a better mousetrap, but corresponding blueprints on how to build a better mouse. Agreeing that "he should play more", Joseph sits the baby in front of the TV, where "Captain Schmideo" is displaying a toy flying saucer being offered as a promotion for Cosmic Crunchies (although the screen identifies it as "Ghastlies") the "new wonder cereal made from unborn sweet peas". The baby retrieves a T-square and triangle, measures the dimensions of the saucer displayed on the TV screen, and retires to his room, where he builds "his own toy spaceship".

Next, the family receives a letter from Mars delivered by a small rocket. Martha expresses comic relief that it was "only" that and not a letter from Mother until both spouses realize the significance and yell "MARS?!" in shock. The message, from "Sir U. Tan of Mars" (a reference to a popular vegetable laxative, "Serutan"), explains how events occurred resulting in a baby-switch, adding that the Martian baby's name is "Mot". Furthermore, Tan states that the Wilburs' baby is on Mars and they call him "Yob" (a reference to a satirical song called 'Serutan Yob' based on the earlier reference to Serutan). The Earthlings are cautioned to guard the baby carefully until the exchange can be made. At that moment, using his highchair as a launch pad, Mot launches his "toy" spaceship out the bedroom window. The frightened Joseph first chases him by foot, then by car. Joseph reaches a high-rise hotel just as Mot is flying into a window on an upper floor. Inside the auditorium, a UFO skeptic (voiced by Butler) is deriding the concept of "little green men from Mars" and "flying saucers" until the little green baby in his flying saucer stops in front of him; the skeptic starts laughing, then bursts into tears. Joseph arrives just as Mot is flying out another open window. He tries, unsuccessfully, to grab the spaceship, and falls out the window, yelling out for Mot's return and Yob's whereabouts as he falls towards oblivion while Mot flies up to a waiting mother ship, which takes him in.

The scene fades and wavers to the PA in the hospital waiting room, where it is revealed that all prior events were a bad dream Joseph had; he had apparently fallen asleep while reading a science magazine carrying the lead story: "Can we communicate with Mars?". Affected by the dream, he dashes to the nursery window to see a healthy human boy rolled in. He whistles with relief. In a twist ending, the view then zooms onto the baby's wrist, on which there is an ID bracelet reading: "YOB".

== Reception ==
Shaenon K. Garrity writes, "Rocket-Bye Baby finds Chuck Jones pushing away from the Warner Bros. house style and toward his own modernist sense of design, influenced in part by the UPA animation studio. His characters are both cute (no one animates more adorable babies) and crisply stylized, with simplified figures and dots for eyes. The backgrounds by Philip DeGuard, who would later paint the backgrounds for What's Opera, Doc? from Maurice Noble's designs, add a cockeyed, angular flair. If the gentle gags lack the breakneck comedy of some of Jones' other work from this, his greatest period, Rocket-Bye Baby is still one of his best-looking shorts, a beautiful piece of animation and design. It also features some of the director's funniest reaction shots, including a little old lady who pauses to tune her voice on a pitch pipe before screaming."

== Home video ==
Rocket-Bye Baby is available on Looney Tunes Golden Collection: Volume 6, Disc 4 and Looney Tunes Platinum Collection: Volume 2, Disc 2.
