= Tolkien Society Awards =

Annual award celebrating work relating to J. R. R. Tolkien

Jenny Dolfen's painting "Eärendil the Mariner" won the inaugural Tolkien Society award for best artwork in 2014.

The Tolkien Society Awards, established in 2014, are presented annually by The Tolkien Society to "recognise excellence in the fields of Tolkien scholarship and fandom". The awards are announced at the Annual Dinner during the Society's AGM and Springmoot weekend.

== Recipients ==
=== Best artwork ===
Artwork winners
Year	Artwork	Artist	Ref.
2014	"Eärendil the Mariner"	Jenny Dolfen	
2015	"Ulmo appears before Tuor"	Fabio Leone	
2016	"The Prancing Pony"	Tomás Hijo	
2017	"Maglor"	Elena Kukanova	
2018	"The Hunt"	Jenny Dolfen	
2019	"Durin's Crown and the Mirrormere"	Ted Nasmith	
2020	"The Professor"	Jenny Dolfen	
2021	"He Beheld a Vision of Gondolin Amid the Snow"	Ted Nasmith	
2022	"Minas Tirith built from 110000 LEGO Bricks"	STEBRICK (model), Stefano Mapelli (design), and BrickCreation (assembly)	
2023	"The Party Tree"	Serena Malyon	
2024	"Frodo's Inheritance"	Donato Giancola	
2025	"Arrival in the Shire"	Ted Nasmith	

=== Best article ===
Article winners
Year	Article	Author	Ref.
2014	"Tolkien and the boy who didn't believe in fairies"	John Garth	
2015	"A Hemlock by any other name…"	Michael Flowers	
2016	"Tolkien's 'immortal four' meet for the last time"	John Garth	
2017	"How J.R.R. Tolkien Found Mordor on the Western Front", in The New York Times, 30 June 2016	Joseph Loconte	
2018	"'Tears are the very wine of blessedness': joyful sorrow in J.R.R. Tolkien's The Lord of the Rings", in Death and Immortality in Middle-earth: Proceedings of The Tolkien Society Seminar 2016	Dimitra Fimi	
2019	"Was Tolkien really racist?" in The Conversation, 6 December 2018	Dimitra Fimi	
2020	"Deconstructing Durin's Day: Science, Scientific Fan Fiction, and the Fan-Scholar" in Journal of Tolkien Research, vol. 8, no. 1	Kristine Larsen	
2021	"Defying and Defining Darkness" in Mallorn 61	Verlyn Flieger	
2022	"A Song of Greater Power: Tolkien's Construction of Lúthien Tinúviel", in Mallorn 62	Clare Moore	
2023	"All that glisters is not gold" in Mallorn 63	Sara Brown	
2024	"The Tale of 'Aldarion and Erendis': Not Just a Medieval Love Story" in Journal of Tolkien Research, vol. 18, no. 1	Sara Brown	
2025	"Sir Gawain and the Green Knight", J. R. R. Tolkien's 1953 W. P. Ker Memorial Lecture: An Updated Chronology and Related Findings, in English Studies, vol. 105, no. 6	Andoni Cossio	

=== Best book ===
Book winners
Year	Book	Author(s)	Ref.
2014	Middle-Earth Envisioned ("Best Book")	Paul Simpson and Brian Robb	
2014	The Fall of Arthur ("Best Novel")	J.R.R. Tolkien, edited by Christopher Tolkien	
2015	Beowulf: A Translation and Commentary	J.R.R. Tolkien, edited by Christopher Tolkien	
2016	The Art of The Lord of the Rings	Wayne G. Hammond and Christina Scull	
2017	A Secret Vice	J.R.R. Tolkien, edited by Dimitra Fimi and Andy Higgins	
2018	Beren and Lúthien	J.R.R. Tolkien, edited by Christopher Tolkien	
2019	Tolkien: Maker of Middle-earth	Catherine McIlwaine	
2020	Tolkien's Library	Oronzo Cilli	
2021	Unfinished Tales (40th anniversary edition)	J.R.R. Tolkien, edited by Christopher Tolkien	
2022	The Nature of Middle-earth	J.R.R. Tolkien, edited by Carl Hostetter	
2023	The Fall of Númenor	J.R.R. Tolkien, edited by Brian Sibley	
2024	The Letters of JRR Tolkien: Revised and Expanded edition	J.R.R. Tolkien, edited by Humphrey Carpenter and Christopher Tolkien	
2025	The Collected Poems of J.R.R. Tolkien	J.R.R. Tolkien, edited by Wayne G. Hammond and Christina Scull	

=== Online content ===
Online content winners
Year	Site	Ref.
2014	LOTR Project by Emil Johansson	
2015	TolkienBooks.net by Neil Holford	
2016	The Journal of Tolkien Research by Bradford Lee Eden	
2017	— none —	
2018	Too Many Books and Never Enough by Wayne G. Hammond and Christina Scull	
2019	TolkienGuide.com by Jeremy Edmonds	
2020	The Prancing Pony Podcast	
2021	Tolkien Experience Podcast	
2022	The Prancing Pony Podcast	
2023	Tolkien Gateway	
2024	Nerd of the Rings	
2025	Digital Tolkien Project	

=== Outstanding contribution ===
Outstanding contribution winners
Year	Recipient	Ref.
2014	Christopher Tolkien	
2015	Tom Shippey	
2016	Verlyn Flieger	
2017	John Garth	
2018	Priscilla Tolkien	
2019	Catherine McIlwaine	
2020	Wayne G. Hammond and Christina Scull	
2021	Dimitra Fimi	
2022	Brian Sibley	
2023	John D. Rateliff	
2024	Charles E. Noad (posthumous)	
2025	Douglas A. Anderson	
