= The Atlas of the Land =

1985 book by Karen Wynn Fonstad

- Author: Karen Wynn Fonstad
- Illustrator: Karen Wynn Fonstad
- Language: English
- Series: The Chronicles of Thomas Covenant
- Subject: The Land
- Genre: Fantasy, Atlas
- Publisher: Del Rey Books
- Publication date: 1985
- Publication place: United States
- Media type: Print
- Pages: 204
- ISBN: 0-345-31433-6
- OCLC: 11915455
- Dewey Decimal: 813/.54 19
- LC Class: PS3556.O47 A8 1985

The Atlas of the Land is a 1985 illustrated book by Karen Wynn Fonstad, which provides a cartographer's point of view to the fictional world known as "the Land" from Stephen R. Donaldson's fantasy novel series The Chronicles of Thomas Covenant.

== Overview ==
Fonstad provides detailed cartography along with annotated descriptions for each map. Some of the larger scaled maps also plot out the travels of various characters and their companions throughout the novels. On some of these maps, Fonstad also goes so far as to detail camp sites, length of travel, moon phases, and even Sunbane cycles.

A Notes section categorizes maps by location/topic, and an Index of Place Names is also included. The Selected References section details Donaldson's novels, personal interviews, and several non-fiction books (and the University of Wisconsin–Oshkosh Department of Geography's cartographic equipment) used to create the tonal line drawn maps (Black, Gray, White, and Rust).

The book also includes detailed drawings of huts, buildings, trees, caves, and ships.

== Reception ==
School Library Journal, in its 1986 book review, says, "Fans--and these books are very popular with teens--will welcome this one."
