= Hordes of the Things (radio series) =

1980 BBC radio comedy series

- Genre: Comic fantasy
- Running time: 30 minutes
- Country of origin: United Kingdom
- Language: English language
- Home station: BBC Radio 4
- Starring: Simon Callow; Frank Middlemass; Paul Eddington; Maggie Steed; Christian Rodska; Jonathan Lynn
- Created by: Andrew Marshall and John Lloyd
- Written by: Andrew Marshall and John Lloyd
- Produced by: Geoffrey Perkins
- Narrated by: Patrick Magee
- Original release: 25 November – 16 December 1980
- No. of episodes: 4
- Audio format: Stereo
- Website: http://www.nigel-baker.co.uk/hott/

Hordes of the Things is a 1980 BBC radio comedy series parodying J. R. R. Tolkien's The Lord of the Rings and to a greater extent the fantasy genre in general, in a style similar to The Hitchhiker's Guide to the Galaxy. It was written by "A. P. R. Marshall and J. H. W. Lloyd" (Andrew Marshall and John Lloyd) and produced by Geoffrey Perkins. It is unrelated to the game of the same name.

== Cast ==
- Christian Rodska as the hero Agar son of Athar
- Patrick Magee as the Chronicler
- Maggie Steed as Queen Elfreda
- Jonathan Lynn as the dwarf Golin Longshanks
- Frank Middlemass as the wizard Radox the Green (named after a brand of green bath salts)
- Simon Callow as the Crown Prince Veganin (named after an analgesic)
- Paul Eddington as the misnamed King Yulfric the Wise III

There are other minor characters named after brands of bath products: Badedas the Blue, and Matey the White.

== Broadcasts and recordings ==
The series consists of four half-hour episodes or "Chronicles", originally broadcast on BBC Radio 4 from 25 November – 16 December 1980. This was the only uncut broadcast; all subsequent repeats have omitted part of the opening narration from "The First Chronicle".

A full-page feature in Radio Times included a map of Albion and a spoof interview with Marshall and Lloyd. The series was repeated only once and largely forgotten until BBC 7 dusted off the (still abridged) tapes for a rerun in May 2003, December 2003, and again in July 2008.

Only six months after Hordes of the Things was first aired, the first episode of the BBC's radio production of The Lord of the Rings began its 26-week run.

BBC Audiobooks Ltd. released the series on CD on 8 October 2009.

== The plot ==
The plot concerns the threat to the small kingdom of Albion by "The Evil One" (a Dark Lord) and her ravening hordes, which have completely surrounded the country and are preparing to move in. Since Albion is an ancient name for Britain or England, the contemporary audience could choose to find references in this to their concerns about the new female prime minister, Margaret Thatcher, the European Common Market, the labour or trade union movement, or feminism. That The Evil One is female is barely mentioned as the story runs – she is off-stage.

Prince Veganin has raised a mighty army to defend Albion, only to see them all call in sick; his father King Yulfric thinks he is exaggerating the danger, and suggests that allowances should be made for foreign customs (like human sacrifice). In any case, Yulfric is too busy changing clothes with a commoner to have any time for affairs of state – the commoner in question being the woodcutter's daughter.

The great wizard Radox recruits the young hero Agar to find the mighty horn Summontrumpet which can call forth the six heroes of legend. To Agar's chagrin, Radox sends him a companion in the shape of the gluttonous dwarf Golin Longshanks, who is under the delusion that Radox's programme of height exercises has turned him into a giant.

Radox himself attends the Great Conference of All Wizards, but most of the wizards are too busy with the food and entertainment to bother with the heavy stuff about destroying evil.

Meanwhile, Veganin has set off on his own quest to slay the leaders of the evil hordes, beginning with the High Bishop of Zylbor, whose priests baptise people by holding their heads under water until they stop struggling. What Veganin doesn't realise, until it is seemingly too late, is that the Bishop's gaze will turn anything it falls upon to ashes.

Agar and Golin finally wrest Summontrumpet from the clutches of the Dread Sphynx, which has the body of a snake, the head of a snake, and the feet of a snake, and arrive upon the plains of Albion as the Seven Armies of Hell begin their invasion. The only thing that could possibly go wrong would be if the wrong person should sound the horn by mistake....

== Critical reaction ==
The British Comedy Guide found it interesting with some good ideas, despite being largely forgotten 20 or 30 years later. TV Cream says it was "widely loved by ‘proper’ Tolkien buffs". Van Arnold-Forster in the Guardian praised the high quality of the cast but said they seemed bemused by the script, in "obvious doubt as to whether the lines are meant to be funny".

== Soundtrack ==
Opening 'theme' taken from Rick Wakeman's 1975 release The Myths and Legends of King Arthur and the Knights of the Round Table, his well known studio concept album. Other underscoring is drawn from Wagner's The Ring of the Nibelung along with other feature segment from other of his canon.

== See also ==
- Bored of the Rings – A parodic novel by the Harvard Lampoon
- ElvenQuest – Another BBC Radio comedy fantasy
- Kröd Mändoon and the Flaming Sword of Fire – A British-American TV series
