= The Atlas of the Dragonlance World =

1987 book by Karen Wynn Fonstad

- Author: Karen Wynn Fonstad
- Illustrator: Karen Wynn Fonstad
- Language: English
- Series: Dragonlance
- Genre: Fantasy, Atlas, Role-playing game
- Publisher: TSR, Inc. Distributed by Random House
- Publication date: 1987
- Publication place: United States
- Pages: 168
- ISBN: 0-88038-448-4
- Dewey Decimal: 813/.54 19
- LC Class: PS3573.E3978 D674 1987

The Atlas of the Dragonlance World by Karen Wynn Fonstad provides a cartographer's illustrated point of view to the fictional world known as "Krynn" from the Dragonlance setting created by Tracy Hickman and Margaret Weis, a fictional setting for the Dungeons & Dragons fantasy role-playing game. This 168-page perfect-bound book was published in 1987.

== Publication history ==
The Atlas of the Dragonlance World was designed by Karen Wynn Fonstad and published in 1987 as a 168-page book.

== Reviews ==
- Casus Belli #42 (Dec 1987)
- Fantasy Worlds (Issue 3 - Dec 1987)
