= Serutan =

Laxative

Serutan was an early fiber-type laxative product that was widely promoted on U.S. radio and television from the 1930s through the 1960s. Serutan was folded into Pharmaceuticals Inc.'s 1957 acquisition of J. B. Williams Co., founded in 1885. J. B. Williams Co. was bought out by Nabisco in 1971, where it continued to operate as a separate subsidiary until Nabsico sold it to Beecham Group in 1982 after nearly a decade of slumping sales.

The origin of the brand name was straightforward. The makers merely decided to spell "natures" backwards, and "Read it backwards" was the product's advertising slogan. This was to differentiate it as being a "natural" product as opposed to laxative brands which stimulated the colon by chemical action.

The product was almost uniformly promoted on programs whose core audience was known to be considerably older than the typical television viewer. Serutan is especially associated with The Lawrence Welk Show and The Original Amateur Hour, both of which were also sponsored by J. B. Williams products Sominex, a sleeping pill, and Geritol, a vitamin supplement. Serutan was the target of numerous jokes by Bob Hope and other radio comedians during the 1930s and 1940s.

== In popular culture ==
A friend of the protagonist of J. P. Donleavy's The Ginger Man refers to himself as the "Acting Duke of Serutan."

In Harvard Lampoon's Bored of the Rings, the parody version of Saruman is named Serutan.

In National Lampoon's Doon, the parody version of Princess Irulan is named Princess Serutan.

Don De Lillo's Libra mentions the slogan in its first chapter.

In Exit the Body, a play by Fred Carmichael, Kate Bixley refers to the protagonist's husband, who writes a newspaper column under the alias "Dorothy Duckworth" and is attending a convention for lonely-hearts column writers, as "The only female at the convention who doesn't take Serutan."

A running gag in the 1944-1945 season of the Jack Benny radio show was a series of commercials by Frank Nelson for "Sympathy Soothing Syrup", which used the slogan "Sympathy spelled backwards is Yhtapmys." Several variations were introduced, most notably the rival brand, Sdrawrof cream.

In the Merrie Melodies cartoon "Rocket-Bye Baby," a telegram from the planet Mars is signed Sir U. Tan of Mars.

Archaeologist Kent Flannery has used the term "Serutan" to describe systemic archaeologists. (Flannery 1973a:49-53)

An Animaniacs stinger has the Warners say, "Yakko spelled backwards is Okkay!"

== Listen to ==
- Red Ingle sings "Serutan Yob (A Song for Backward Boys and Girls under 40)"
