= The Sundering Flood =

1897 novel by William Morris

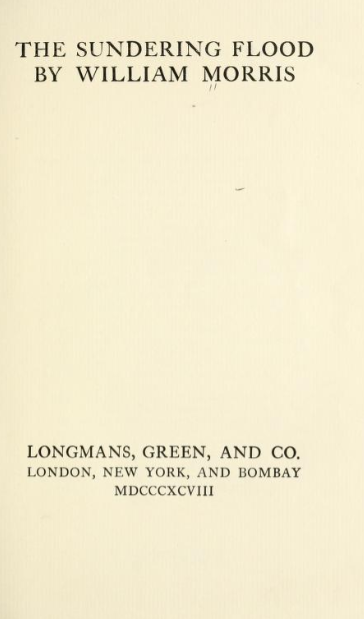
- Title page for The Sundering Flood (1898)
- Author: William Morris
- Language: English
- Genre: Fantasy
- Publisher: Kelmscott Press
- Publication date: 1897
- Publication place: United Kingdom
- Media type: Print (Hardback)
- Pages: 508
- ISBN: 978-1514832653
- Text: The Sundering Flood at Wikisource

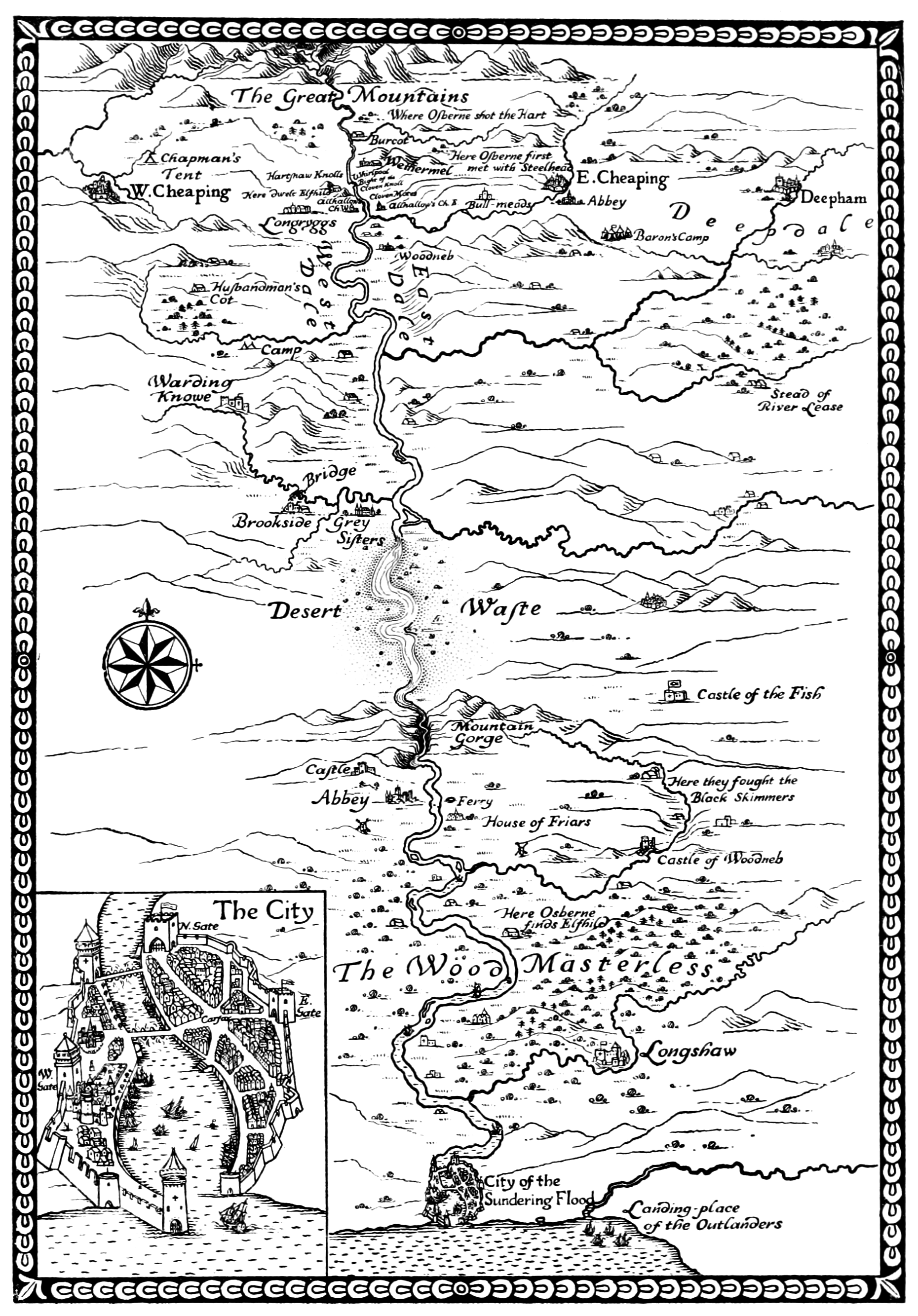
Frontispiece map from the first edition.

The Sundering Flood is a fantasy novel by British writer William Morris, perhaps the first modern fantasy writer to unite an imaginary world with the element of the supernatural, and thus the precursor of much of present-day fantasy literature. The Sundering Flood was Morris' last work of fiction, completed only in rough draft, with the ending dictated from his deathbed. It was edited posthumously by his daughter May into finished form for publication and published in 1897.

Morris considered his fantasies a revival of the medieval tradition of chivalrous romances, and was accordingly willing to use archaic-sounding language. However, in editor and critic Lin Carter's estimation, "Morris' imitation of medieval prose was not overdone: clarity and simplicity and a certain haunting and lyrical music makes it very readable."

== Plot summary ==
Osberne Wulfgrimsson and Elfhild are lovers who live on opposite sides of the Sundering Flood, an immense river, which they cannot cross. When Elfhild disappears during an invasion by the Red Skinners, the heartbroken Osberne takes up his magical sword Board-cleaver and joins the army of Sir Godrick of Longshaw, in whose service he helps dethrone the tyrannical king and plutocracy of merchants ruling the city at the mouth of the river. Afterwards he locates Elfhild, who had fled with a relative, a wise woman skilled in the magical arts, and taken refuge in the Wood Masterless. Elfhild tells Osberne of their adventures en route to safety. Afterwards they return together to Wethermel, Osberne's home, and all ends happily.

== History and influence ==
The novel was first published posthumously in hardcover by Morris' Kelmscott Press in 1897. Its importance in the history of fantasy literature was recognized by its republication by Ballantine Books as the fifty-seventh volume of the celebrated Ballantine Adult Fantasy series in May, 1973. The Ballantine edition includes an introduction by Lin Carter.

The book appears to be the first fantasy novel to include what has become conventional in the genre, a fantasy map that defines a wholly imagined world.

In 2025 a tabletop roleplaying game, "In the land of the sundering flood" was launched on kickstarter by British games publisher Mammoth Miniatures. The game takes its title and setting from the sundering flood as well as Morris' other fantasy writings.
