= Discontinued Hugo Awards =

Former awards for science fiction or fantasy

The Hugo Awards are presented every year by the World Science Fiction Society for the best science fiction or fantasy works and achievements of the previous year. The award is named after Hugo Gernsback, the founder of the pioneering science fiction magazine Amazing Stories, and was once officially known as the Science Fiction Achievement Award. The award has been described as "a fine showcase for speculative fiction" and "the best known literary award for science fiction writing". In addition to the regular awards that have been given in most years that the awards have been active, several discontinued Hugo Awards have been presented throughout the years, only to be removed after a few years.

When the Hugo awards were begun in 1953, each Worldcon organizing committee decided what awards they would give. Several awards were presented over the next few years which were not repeated in later conventions, unlike the primary categories which are still presented—such as Best Novel. These awards were the Best Cover Artist, Best Interior Illustrator, Excellence in Fact Articles, Best New SF Author or Artist, and #1 Fan Personality Hugos at the initial 1953 awards ceremony, the Best Feature Writer, Best Book Reviewer, and Most Promising New Author awards in 1956, the Outstanding Actifan award in 1958, and the Best New Author of 1958 award in 1959.

In 1961, however, formal rules were set down for which categories would be awarded, which could only be changed by the World Science Fiction Society membership through the annual Business Meeting. Despite this, the 1964 convention awarded a Hugo Award for the Best SF Book Publisher, which was not on that list. Immediately afterward the guidelines were changed to allow individual conventions to create additional categories, which was codified as up to two categories for that year. These additional awards were officially designated as Hugo Awards, but were not required to be repeated by future conventions. This was later adjusted to only allow one additional category. The Best SF Book Publisher award was repeated in 1965, and the Best All-Time Series award was given in 1966. No other additional categories were added by 1974, when the guidelines were changed again to allow up to ten categories which would be chosen by each convention, though they were expected to be similar to those presented in the year before. Despite this change no new awards were added or previous awards removed before the guidelines were changed back to listing specific categories.

The next discontinued Hugo award was the Other Forms award, given in 1988. It was followed in 1990 by the Best Original Art Work award, which was listed again as a special award in 1991, though not actually awarded, and instated afterward as an official Hugo Award. It was then removed from this status in 1996, and has not been awarded since. The Best Web Site special Hugo award was given in 2002 and 2005, and was followed by the Best Series special award, given in 2017 in advance of it being ratified as a standard category for the following year, and the Best Art Book award, given in 2019. The Best Video Game award was given in 2021 along with a proposal to make it a standard category, which then began in 2024, and the Best Poem award was given in 2025 and 2026 before being made a permanent category.

Hugo Award nominees and winners are chosen by supporting or attending members of the annual World Science Fiction Convention, or Worldcon, and the presentation evening constitutes its central event. The selection process is defined in the World Science Fiction Society Constitution as instant-runoff voting with six finalists, except in the case of a tie. These six works on the ballot are those most-nominated by members that year, with no limit on the number of works that can be nominated. The 1953 and 1958 awards did not include any recognition of runner-up nominees, but since 1959 all finalists have been recorded. Initial nominations are made by members in January through March, while voting on the ballot of six finalists is performed roughly in April through July, subject to change depending on when that year's Worldcon is held. Worldcons are generally held near Labor Day, and in a different city around the world each year. Members are permitted to vote "no award", if they feel that none of the nominees is deserving of the award that year, and in the case that "no award" takes the majority the Hugo is not given in that category. The only time this has happened in the discontinued awards was in the 1959 Best New Author category.

== Winners and finalists ==
* Winners and joint winners
+ No winner selected

=== Best Cover Artist ===
Best Cover Artist
Year	Artist	Ref.
1953	Hannes Bok and Ed Emshwiller*	

=== Best Interior Illustrator ===
Best Interior Illustrator
Year	Artist	Ref.
1953	Virgil Finlay*	

=== Excellence in Fact Articles ===
Excellence in Fact Articles
Year	Author	Ref.
1953	Willy Ley*	

=== Best New SF Author or Artist ===
Best New SF Author or Artist
Year	Author/Artist	Ref.
1953	Philip José Farmer*	

=== #1 Fan Personality ===
#1 Fan Personality
Year	Fan	Ref.
1953	Forrest J Ackerman*	

Sometimes referred to as the "BNF Award". According to an interim report issued by the Philcon II convention committee while voting was still going on, the next most popular candidate to Ackerman at the time was Harlan Ellison. When Ackerman was handed the trophy at Philcon II (by Isaac Asimov), he actually physically declined, saying it should go to Ken Slater, to whom the trophy was later forwarded by the con committee.

=== Best Feature Writer ===
Best Feature Writer
Year	Writer	Ref.
1956	Willy Ley*	
1956	L. Sprague de Camp	
1956	Robert A. Madle	
1956	Rog Phillips	
1956	Robert S. Richardson	

=== Best Book Reviewer ===
Best Book Reviewer
Year	Reviewer	Ref.
1956	Damon Knight*	
1956	Henry Bott	
1956	P. Schuyler Miller	
1956	Anthony Boucher	
1956	Groff Conklin	
1956	Villers Gerson	
1956	Floyd Gale	
1956	Hans Stefan Santesson	

=== Most Promising New Author ===
Most Promising New Author
Year	Author	Ref.
1956	Robert Silverberg*	
1956	Harlan Ellison	
1956	Frank Herbert	
1956	Henry Still	

=== Outstanding Actifan ===
Outstanding Actifan
Year	Fan	Ref.
1958	Walt Willis*	

=== Best New Author ===
Best New Author
Year	Author	Ref.
1959	(no award)+	
1959	Brian Aldiss	
1959	Pauline Ashwell	
1959	Rosel George Brown	
1959	Louis Charbonneau	
1959	Kit Reed	

=== Best SF Book Publisher ===
Best SF Book Publisher
Year	Publisher	Ref.
1964	Ace Books*	
1964	Pyramid Books	
1964	Ballantine Books	
1964	Doubleday	
1965	Ballantine Books*	
1965	Ace Books	
1965	Victor Gollancz Ltd	
1965	Pyramid Books	

=== Best All-Time Series ===
Best All-Time Series
Year	Series	Author	Ref.
1966	Foundation*	Isaac Asimov	
1966	Barsoom	Edgar Rice Burroughs	
1966	Future History	Robert A. Heinlein	
1966	Lensmen	E. E. Smith	
1966	The Lord of the Rings	J. R. R. Tolkien	

=== Other Forms ===
Other Forms
Year	Work	Creator(s)	Publisher	Ref.
1988	Watchmen*	Alan Moore and Dave Gibbons	DC Comics	
1988	Wild Cards	George R. R. Martin	Bantam Spectra	
1988	I, Robot: The Movie	Harlan Ellison	Asimov's Science Fiction	
1988	The Essential Ellison: A 35-Year Retrospective	Harlan Ellison, Terry Dowling, Richard Delap, and Gil Lamont	Nemo Press	
1988	Cvltvre Made Stvpid	Tom Weller	Houghton Mifflin	

=== Best Original Art Work ===
Best Original Art Work
Year	Artwork	Artist(s)	Publisher	Ref.
1990	Cover of Rimrunners*	Don Maitz	Questar	
1990	Cover of Hyperion	Gary Ruddell	Doubleday	
1990	Cover of Paradise	Michael Whelan	Tor Books	
1990	Cover of The Renegades of Pern	Michael Whelan	Del Rey Books	
1990	Cover of Quozl	James Gurney	Ace Books	
1990	Cover of The Stress of Her Regard	James Gurney	Ace Books	
1992	Cover of The Summer Queen*	Michael Whelan	Warner Books	
1992	Cover of Stations of the Tide	Bob Eggleton	Asimov's Science Fiction	
1992	Cover of The White Mists of Power	Thomas Canty	Roc Books	
1992	Cover of Heavy Time	Don Maitz	Questar	
1992	Cover of Lunar Descent	Bob Eggleton	Ace Books	
1993	Dinotopia*	James Gurney	Turner Publishing Company	
1993	Cover of Aristoi	Jim Burns	Tor Books	
1993	Portrait of Isaac Asimov	Michael Whelan	Asimov's Science Fiction	
1993	Cover of Bridges	Ron Walotsky	Fantasy & Science Fiction	
1993	Cover of Illusion	Michael Whelan	Bantam Spectra	
1994	Space Fantasy Commemorative Stamp Booklet*	Stephen Hickman	United States Postal Service	
1994	Cover of The Little Things	Thomas Canty	Fantasy & Science Fiction	
1994	Cover of Cold Iron	Keith Parkinson	Asimov's Science Fiction	
1995	Lady Cottington's Pressed Fairy Book*	Brian Froud and Terry Jones	Pavilion Books	
1995	Cover of Foreigner	Michael Whelan	DAW Books	
1995	Cover of Gun, with Occasional Music	Michael Koelsch	Harcourt Brace	
1996	Dinotopia: The World Beneath*	James Gurney	Turner Publishing Company	
1996	Cover of Tide of Stars	Bob Eggleton	Analog Science Fiction and Fact	
1996	Cover of Tea and Hamsters	Gary Lippincott	Fantasy & Science Fiction	
1996	Cover of Dankden	Bob Eggleton	Fantasy & Science Fiction	
1996	Cover of Renascence	George H. Krauter	Analog Science Fiction and Fact	

=== Best Web Site ===
Best Web Site
Year	Website	Editor(s)	Ref.
2002	Locus Online (www.locusmag.com)*	Mark R. Kelly	
2002	Sci Fiction (www.scifi.com)	Craig Engler	
2002	SF Site (www.sfsite.com)	Rodger Turner	
2002	Strange Horizons (www.strangehorizons.com)	Mary Anne Mohanraj	
2002	Tangent Online (www.tangentonline.com)	Dave Truesdale and Tobias S. Buckell	
2005	Sci Fiction (www.scifi.com/scifiction)*	Ellen Datlow	
2005	Locus Online (www.locusmag.com)	Mark R. Kelly	
2005	Emerald City (www.emcit.com)	Cheryl Morgan	
2005	Strange Horizons (www.strangehorizons.com)	Susan Marie Groppi	
2005	eFanzines (www.efanzines.com)	Bill Burns	

=== Best Art Book ===
Best Art Book
Year	Book	Artist(s)	Publisher	Ref.
2019	The Books of Earthsea: The Complete Illustrated Edition*	Charles Vess (illustrator), Ursula K. Le Guin (author)	Saga Press / Victor Gollancz Ltd	
2019	Daydreamer's Journey: The Art of Julie Dillon	Julie Dillon	self-published	
2019	Dungeons & Dragons Art & Arcana: A Visual History	Michael Witwer, Kyle Newman, Jon Peterson, and Sam Witwer	Ten Speed Press	
2019	Spectrum 25: The Best in Contemporary Fantastic Art	John Fleskes (editor)	Flesk Publications	
2019	Spider-Man: Into the Spider-Verse – The Art of the Movie	Ramin Zahed	Titan Books	
2019	Tolkien: Maker of Middle-earth	Catherine McIlwaine (editor)	Bodleian Library	
