= ElvenQuest =

BBC comedy fantasy radio program

- Other names: Elvenquest; Elven Quest; Elven's Quest (working title)
- Genre: Comic fantasy
- Running time: 30 minutes
- Country of origin: United Kingdom
- Language: English
- Home station: BBC Radio 4
- Starring: Stephen Mangan; Alistair McGowan; Darren Boyd; Kevin Eldon; Sophie Winkleman; Dave Lamb; Chris Pavlo
- Written by: Anil Gupta; Richard Pinto
- Produced by: Anil Gupta; Paul Schlesinger
- Original release: 29 March 2009 – 2013
- No. of series: 4
- No. of episodes: 24
- Website: BBC website

ElvenQuest is a comic fantasy broadcast on BBC Radio 4 by Anil Gupta and Richard Pinto, and starring Stephen Mangan, Alistair McGowan, Darren Boyd, Kevin Eldon, Sophie Winkleman and Dave Lamb. The series takes place in the world of Lower Earth, a parody of Middle-earth from The Lord of the Rings by J. R. R. Tolkien. In Lower Earth, a band of warriors go forth to search for a mythical sword to save Lower Earth from the evil Lord Darkness (played by McGowan). In order to do so, they must find "The Chosen One" who will save Lower Earth. The Chosen One is Amis, a dog in the real world which belongs to a fantasy novelist called Sam Porter (played by Mangan). The first series was broadcast from 29 March to 3 May 2009 and the second from 18 November to 23 December 2010. The third series was broadcast from 17 October to 21 November 2011. The fourth series was broadcast from 12 February to 19 March 2013.

== Plot ==
During the Third Age of Elven Princes of Lower Earth, a band of noble warriors – Vidar the Elf Lord (Boyd), Penthiselea the Warrior Princess (Winkleman, later Ingrid Oliver) and Dean the Dwarf (Eldon) – plan to save Lower Earth from the evil rule of Lord Darkness by searching for the Sword of Asnagar, "for whoso'er wields the sword shall rule all of Lower Earth." However, they first have to discover "The Chosen One" who will lead them to the Sword, whose name is "Amis". Amis is a dog belonging to Sam Porter, a misanthropic fantasy novelist in the real world.

Vidar, Penthesilea and Dean travel via a portal to take Amis, who is with Sam at a book signing in Totnes High Street, to Lower Earth. When they take Amis, Sam follows them and both Sam and Amis arrive in Lower Earth. When they arrive in Lower Earth, Amis is transformed into a human (played by Lamb), retaining many of his canine traits, such as becoming excited when there is a knock at the door, and being totally devoted to Sam. Sam believes he has been kidnapped by deranged fans until he sees the world outside the room in which he awakes. He asks to be sent back home, but is told that the portal is closed and can only be opened by the same Sword of Asnagar that Amis must seek.

Sam decides to travel with Amis, Vidar, Penthiselea and Dean to find the Sword. Meanwhile, Lord Darkness (Alistair McGowan) is planning to stop them from finding the Sword, helped by his evil but dimwitted assistant Kreech (also played by Eldon). Sam proves invaluable in using his modern instincts to trick his way past various creatures barring their way. For instance, he bluffs a three-headed troll guardian of Darkness' fortress in the same way as he would a security guard at a nightclub, distracting it long enough for Dean the dwarf to attack. He also tends to expect secret tunnels and concealed doors because that's the sort of thing he would have written into one of his plots. He is often right.

== Characters ==
- Sam Porter (Stephen Mangan). An author of fantasy novels with a jaded attitude, especially towards his more fanatical fans. As the series opens his career and personal life are not going well.
- Amis, the Chosen One (Dave Lamb). Originally Sam's pet dog and best friend in the world, he transforms into a human in Lower Earth but retains canine traits and behaviours.
- Vidar the Elf Lord (Darren Boyd), last of a mighty family of Elf Lords, and the leader of the Questers, despite being somewhat dim. His name may be inspired by Víðarr, a god in Norse mythology associated with vengeance.
- Penthiselea the Warrior Princess (Sophie Winkleman Series 1–3) (Ingrid Oliver Series 4) in silver breastplate armour and thigh-high boots, who has been promised to Vidar since childhood. Sam is very interested in her, but having been raised as a Warrior Princess she has no concept of relationships with men. Her name may be inspired by Penthesilea, a legendary Amazon warrior-queen. Though she changed actress from series three to four, her appearance on the cover art remained the same.
- Dean the Dwarf (Kevin Eldon), a mighty if diminutive warrior with unsavoury personal habits. After the first series it is hinted less and less subtly that he is gay.
- Lord Darkness (Alistair McGowan), Lord of Evil, whose efforts to dominate Lower Earth are frustrated by the Questers and his own staff of extremely dimwitted minions. In later episodes, his evil plans frequently do not interfere with those of the questers, and they are generally on cordial terms with each other.
- Kreech (Kevin Eldon), the Right Hand of Darkness, and only slightly less dimwitted than the other minions -- the name being a contraction of Creature.
- Other characters played by Chris Pavlo.

== Production ==
One of the writers, Gupta, said in an interview with the BBC Comedy website that ElvenQuest is not designed to be a spoof of Lord of the Rings, because this had already been done in an earlier radio sitcom, Hordes of the Things. He also said that: "we wanted to create a show which would exist in its own right. In the best sitcoms the comedy should come from the characters and their inter-relationships, which means they can't simply be two dimensional parodies."

== See also ==
- Hordes of the Things
- Kröd Mändoon and the Flaming Sword of Fire
- The Sofa of Time
