= Tolkien's artwork =

Component of Tolkien's writings

Tolkien's illustration of the Doors of Durin for The Fellowship of the Ring, with Sindarin inscription in Tengwar script, both being his inventions. Despite his best efforts, this was the only drawing, other than maps and calligraphy, in the first edition of The Lord of the Rings. In early editions it was printed in black on white rather than, as here and as Tolkien wished, in white on black. (Note: Carpenter 2023, #137 to Rayner Unwin, 11 April 1953)

Tolkien's artwork was a key element of his creativity from the time when he began to write fiction. A professional philologist, J. R. R. Tolkien prepared a wide variety of materials to support his fiction, including illustrations for his Middle-earth fantasy books, facsimile artefacts, more or less "picturesque" maps, calligraphy, and sketches and paintings from life. Some of his artworks combined several of these elements.

In his lifetime, some of his artworks were included in his novels The Hobbit and The Lord of the Rings; others were used on the covers of different editions of these books. Posthumously, collections of his artworks have been published, and academics have begun to evaluate him as an artist as well as an author.

== Early work: sketches ==
Ink drawing of "Quallington Carpenter", Eastbury, Berkshire, 1912

Early in his life, Tolkien, taught by his mother, made many sketches and paintings from life. He drew with skill and depicted landscapes, buildings, trees, and flowers realistically. The one thing he admitted he could not draw was the human figure, where his attempts have been described as "cartoonish", as if "a different hand" was involved. The scholars Wayne G. Hammond and Christina Scull describe his 1912 ink drawing of a cottage in Berkshire, "Quallington Carpenter", as "the most impressive" of these early works, its "sagging walls" and thatched roof "elaborately textured and shaded".

== Illustrations for his books ==
Tolkien's illustrations for his books consisted of drawings, paintings, artefacts, more or less "picturesque" maps, and calligraphy. Hans Velten suggests that Tolkien's visual style was influenced by William Morris, whose work Tolkien admired.

=== The Hobbit ===
Watercolour painting The Hill: Hobbiton-across-the-Water used as the frontispiece of the first American edition of The Hobbit, 1938 (Note: Tolkien 1979, Figure 1)

Tolkien's illustrations contributed to the effectiveness of his writings, though much of his oeuvre remained unpublished in his lifetime. However, the first British edition of The Hobbit in 1937 was published with ten of his black-and-white drawings. In addition, it had as its frontispiece Tolkien's drawing The Hill: Hobbiton-across-the-Water. It depicts Bilbo Baggins's home village of Hobbiton in the Shire. The old mill, based on the mill at Sarehole, and The Water are in the foreground, an idealised English countryside in the middle distance, and The Hill and Bilbo's home Bag End (tunnelled into The Hill) in the background. The American edition replaced the frontispiece with Tolkien's full-colour watercolour painting of the same scene; this was then used in later impressions in England also. The American edition had in addition four of his watercolour paintings.

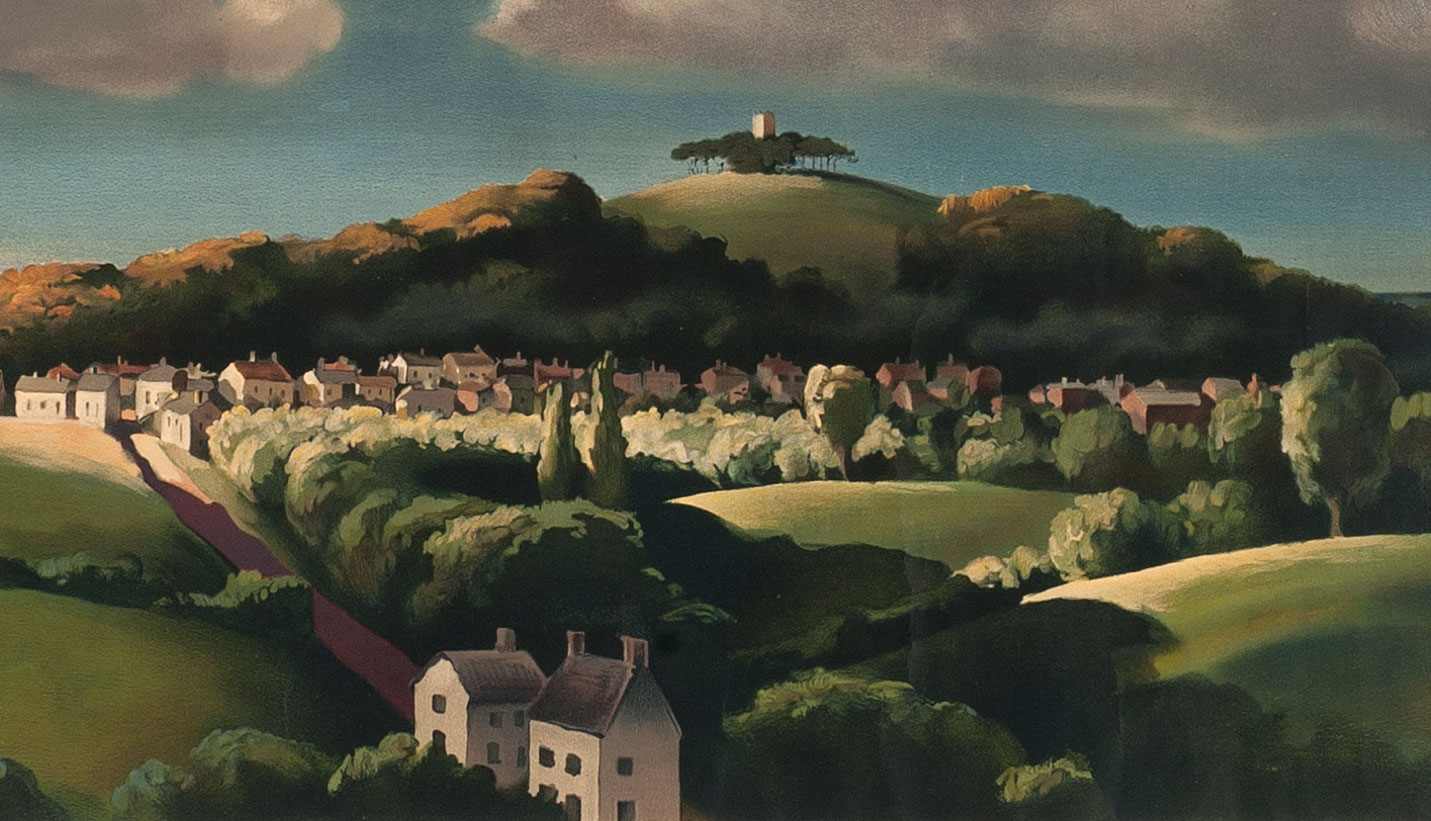
John Garth notes the likeness of Tolkien's painting to Lord Berners's 1936 painting of Faringdon Folly, used as an advertisement by Shell, 1936.

Tolkien's biographer John Garth notes the likeness of Tolkien's painting to the 1936 painting of Faringdon Folly by Lord Berners, used as an advertisement by Shell, 1936. Garth comments that "the angles, proportions, shapes, and arrangement ... are strikingly similar, from the foreground building to the tree-crowned hill", despite the more horizontal painting. The image was well-known at the time Tolkien was writing The Hobbit, as Shell had it painted on their oil delivery trucks. Berners's decision to construct the Faringdon Folly landmark, a tall tower atop a hill on his estate in South Oxfordshire, too, was controversial, and Tolkien is thought to have been very interested in the construction.

=== The Lord of the Rings ===
==== The Book of Mazarbul ====
The first page from The Book of Mazarbul, in the form of a facsimile artefact created by Tolkien to support the story and bring readers into his fantasy. The publishers declined to include a reproduction of the artefact in the first edition of The Lord of the Rings. (Note: Carpenter 2023, #141 to Allen & Unwin, 9 October 1953)

Tolkien worked on making realistic artefacts to accompany his writing; he spent enormous effort on a facsimile Book of Mazarbul to resemble the burnt, torn volume abandoned at the tomb of the Dwarf-leader Balin in the subterranean realm of Moria; in the story, the wizard Gandalf finds the book and struggles to read out a substantial amount of the damaged text. (Note: Tolkien 1954a, book 2, ch. 5 "The Bridge of Khazad-Dûm") Tolkien carefully stained the artefact's materials, actually burning in the burn-marks and tearing the paper to make it as authentic as possible. He anxiously wrote to his publisher Rayner Unwin asking about the reproduction of the artefact. (Note: Carpenter 2023, #139 to Rayner Unwin, 8 August 1953) The company however chose not to include an image of the book in the first edition, prompting Tolkien to remark that without it the text at the start of "The Bridge of Khazad-Dûm" was "rather absurd". Tolkien realized late in his life that he had made a mistake in the artefact: the text was written in runes, as if somehow the Book of Mazarbul had surprisingly survived thousands of years from the Third Age, but the text itself was English, not the Common Speech that the book's scribe would have used.

==== The Doors of Durin ====
The Lord of the Rings, despite Tolkien's best efforts, appeared with only one illustration other than its maps and calligraphy. This was The Doors of Durin, in the first volume, The Fellowship of the Ring, in 1954. (Note: Tolkien 1954a, book 2, ch. 4 "A Journey in the Dark")

The Doors of Durin were the magical stone gates forming the western entrance to Moria; they were invisible when shut, but could be made visible by moonlight, whereupon their lettering and design, worked in mithril, could be seen. That lettering in fact contained a welcome and the password, to those who could read the Feänorian script (Tengwar) and understand the Elvish language (Sindarin). Tolkien gave the design elegantly curled trees, mirroring the curls of the script. The design's clean lines cost Tolkien much effort; he made numerous sketches, each one a simplification of the last, to attain the apparent simplicity of the final design.

A Númenórean tile, such as might have been saved from the wreck of Númenor by Elendil, and taken in his ships to Middle-earth (Note: Tolkien 1979, Figure 46)

He wrote to Unwin that while he was drawing it in black ink "it should of course properly appear in white line on a black background, since it represents a silver line in the darkness. How does that appeal to the Production Department?"

The image was accompanied by a calligraphic caption in English, made to resemble "both the insular characters of Old English manuscript and the very Feänorian characters [that] it translates".

=== The Silmarillion ===
Tolkien did not live to see The Silmarillion published, but he prepared images for it, including paintings of several symmetrical tile-like heraldic emblems for its kings and houses, and an actual Númenórean tile such as would have been rescued from the wreck of the civilisation of Númenor in Elendil's ships, and brought to Middle-earth. One of his emblems, for Lúthien Tinúviel, was used on the front cover of The Silmarillion, and another five (for Fingolfin, Eärendil, Idril Celebrindal, Elwë, and Fëanor) were used on the back cover. (Note: Tolkien 1977, Front and back cover)

=== Maps ===
Fantasy, cartography, calligraphy: Detail from Tolkien's map of Wilderland in The Hobbit, supposedly a fair copy made by the Hobbit Bilbo Baggins, an illusion reinforced by Tolkien's own "charming hand lettering".

Tolkien's maps, like his illustrations, helped his readers to enter his subcreated world of Middle-earth. The Hobbit had two maps; The Lord of the Rings had three, redrawn by his son Christopher Tolkien; The Silmarillion had two. These served multiple purposes, first as guides to the author, helping to ensure consistency in the narrative, and later to the reader through the often complex routes taken by his characters.

=== Calligraphy ===
Tolkien's profession of philology made him familiar with medieval illuminated manuscripts; he imitated their style in his own calligraphy, an art which his mother had taught him. He applied this skill in his development of Middle-earth, creating alphabets such as Tengwar for his invented languages, especially Elvish.

Tolkien applied his skill in calligraphy to write the One Ring's iconic inscription, in the Black Speech of Mordor, using Tengwar. The calligraphic inscription and a translation provided by Gandalf appear in The Fellowship of the Ring. (Note: Tolkien 1954a, book 1, ch. 2 "The Shadow of the Past")

Multiple dimensions of artistry: Tolkien used his skill in calligraphy to write the One Ring's iconic inscription, in the Black Speech of Mordor, using the Elvish Tengwar script, both of which he invented.

=== Picture book: Mr. Bliss ===
Tolkien's picture book for small children, Mr. Bliss, tells, in pictures and handwritten text, of Mr. Bliss's adventures in his new motor-car. Tolkien, asked for another book to follow The Hobbit, submitted the manuscript of Mr. Bliss, with illustrations in ink and coloured pencil, but it was declined, not being published until 1982.

== Publication ==
In 1979, Tolkien's son Christopher began the process of bringing his father's artwork to the world's attention, beyond the images already published at that time on calendars, by editing Pictures by J.R.R. Tolkien. (Note: Tolkien 1979, Foreword) It had 48 plates, some in colour.

Two major books have addressed Tolkien's artwork: Hammond and Scull's 1995 collection of his paintings, J. R. R. Tolkien: Artist & Illustrator; and Catherine McIlwaine's 2018 book accompanying the exhibition she curated at the Bodleian Library, Tolkien: Maker of Middle-earth. Hammond and Scull have also published two further collections; The Art of The Hobbit by J. R. R. Tolkien (2011) and The Art of The Lord of the Rings by J. R. R. Tolkien (2015).

== Analysis ==
Influences on Tolkien's artwork identified by scholars include Japonisme, Art Nouveau, Viking design, and William Morris. Japonisme is seen in stylised features like Tolkien's mountains, waves, and dragons. The influence of Morris's book Some Hints on Pattern Designing, which Tolkien owned, appears in his designs for tiles and heraldic devices for The Silmarillion.

John R. Holmes, in the J. R. R. Tolkien Encyclopedia, states that given the struggle faced by literary critics to establish Tolkien's position as a writer, in the face of an enduringly hostile literary establishment, "the problem of evaluating Tolkien's status as a visual artist is even more daunting". The Tolkien scholar Patchen Mortimer similarly comments on the "contentious debate" about him, noting that his many readers find his books and "the attendant languages, histories, maps, artwork, and apocrypha" a huge accomplishment, while his critics "dismiss his work as childish, irrelevant, and worse". Mortimer observes that admirers and critics treat his work as "escapist and romantic", nothing to do with the 20th century. Mortimer calls this "an appalling oversight", writing that "Tolkien's project was as grand and avant-garde as those of Wagner or the Futurists, and his works are as suffused with the spirit of the age as any by Eliot, Joyce, or Hemingway".

The Tolkien scholars Jeffrey J. MacLeod and Anna Smol write that as an artist, Tolkien "straddled the amateur and professional fields", something he did also in his fiction and his scholarly studies. They note that he always had pencils, paper, coloured inks, chalks, and paintboxes to hand, and that his metaphors of creativity, as in his essay On Fairy-Stories, constantly refer to colour, or as in his poem Mythopoeia, to the theme of light, something that the scholar of mythology and medieval literature Verlyn Flieger calls central to the whole mythology, seen throughout The Silmarillion. MacLeod and Smol write that images and text "merge" in his creative work in four ways: in drafting his tales; in shaping his descriptions of landscapes; in his explorations of the visual appearance of text, as in his invented alphabets, his calligraphy, and his "JRRT" monogram; and in his view of the relationship between illustration and fantasy. In short, they conclude, "Tolkien's art and his visual imagination should be considered an essential part of his writing and thinking."

== Artists inspired by Tolkien's writing ==
Many artists and illustrators have created drawings, paintings, and book illustrations of Tolkien's Middle-earth. Tolkien was critical of some of the early attempts, (Note: Carpenter 2023, #107 to Sir Stanley Unwin, 7 December 1946.) but was happy to collaborate with the illustrator Pauline Baynes, who prepared the iconic map of Middle-earth. Among the many artists who have worked on Middle-earth projects are John Howe, Alan Lee, and Ted Nasmith; as well as illustrating books, Howe and Lee worked as conceptual artists for Peter Jackson's The Lord of the Rings film trilogy.
