= Mr. Bliss =

Picture book by J. R. R. Tolkien

- First edition
- Author: J. R. R. Tolkien
- Illustrator: J. R. R. Tolkien
- Cover artist: J. R. R. Tolkien
- Language: English
- Genre: Children's literature Fantasy fiction
- Publisher: George Allen & Unwin
- Publication date: September 1982
- Publication place: United Kingdom
- Media type: Print (hardback & paperback)
- Preceded by: The Letters of J. R. R. Tolkien
- Followed by: Finn and Hengest

Mr. Bliss is a children's picture book by J. R. R. Tolkien, published posthumously in book form in 1982. One of Tolkien's least-known short works, it tells the story of Mr. Bliss and his first ride in his new motor-car. Many adventures follow: encounters with bears, angry neighbours, irate shopkeepers, and assorted collisions.

== Narrative ==
Mr. Bliss tells the story, in pictures and handwritten text, of Mr. Bliss and his first ride in his new motor-car. Many adventures follow: encounters with bears, angry neighbours, irate shopkeepers, and assorted collisions.

== Concept and creation ==
The story was inspired by Tolkien's own vehicular mishaps with his first car, purchased in 1932. The bears were based on toy bears owned by Tolkien's sons. Tolkien was both author and illustrator of the book. His narrative binds the story and illustrations tightly together, as the text often comments directly on the pictures.

Several commentators have compared Mr. Bliss with the works of Beatrix Potter and Edward Lear, and also to The Wind in the Willows.

Mr. Bliss was not published during Tolkien's lifetime. He submitted it to his publishers as a balm to readers who were hungry for more from him after the success of The Hobbit. The ink and coloured pencil illustrations would have made production costs prohibitively expensive. Tolkien agreed to redraw the pictures in a simpler style, but then found he didn't have time to do it. The manuscript lay in a drawer until 1957, when he sold it (as well as the original manuscripts of The Lord of the Rings, The Hobbit, and Farmer Giles of Ham) to Marquette University for £1,250. It was first published by George Allen & Unwin in hardback in 1982. It had Tolkien's difficult-to-read handwritten story and illustrations on one page, and a typeset transcription on the facing page.

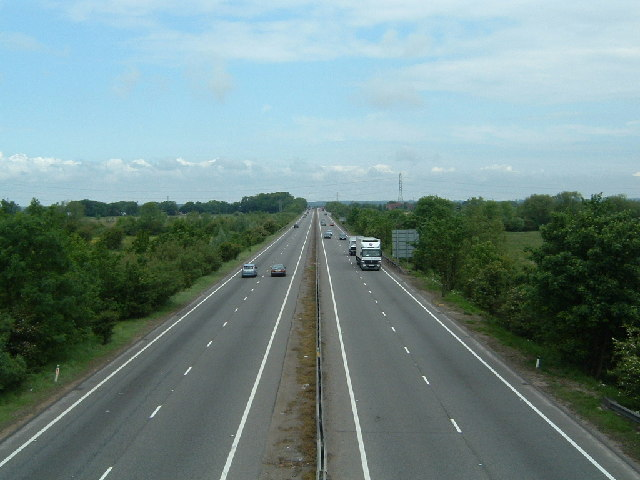
One of the new roads that Tolkien felt were "gutting" the Oxfordshire countryside, the A34

Alex Lewis, in Mallorn, writes that Tolkien lamented the loss of the countryside in and around Oxfordshire. Tolkien loved nature, especially trees, and had what Lewis calls "well-founded" fears for the environment, "verg[ing] on the prophetic". Lewis analyses the factors that were causing this loss. They included the growth in Oxfordshire's population in the 20th century (doubling between 1920 and 1960); the area's industrialisation by Morris Motors, and the concomitant increase in motor traffic in the city of Oxford; the building of roads, including the M40 motorway cutting across the countryside; and the suburbanisation of Oxford as commuters started to use the railway to allow them to live in Oxford but work in London. The Second World War increased the number of airfields in the area from 5 to 96, causing the Oxfordshire countryside to be "gutted". Tolkien found that it was "difficult [in 1949] to recapture the spirit of the former days, when we used to beat the bounds of the L[ittle] K[ingdom] [as in Farmer Giles of Ham] in an ancient car." Tolkien was horrified by the change that motor traffic wreaked on Oxford, and the air pollution; he gave up his happy but dangerous driving, as depicted in Mr. Bliss, at the start of the war.

Tolkien used two names from Mr. Bliss for hobbits in The Lord of the Rings: Gaffer Gamgee and Boffin.

== See also ==
- The Making of the English Landscape – a non-fiction book by an Oxfordshire author concerned about the loss of the historic landscape
