= The Atlas of Middle-earth =

1981 book by Karen Wynn Fonstad

- Dust wrapper, first edition
- Author: Karen Wynn Fonstad
- Illustrator: Karen Wynn Fonstad
- Cover artist: Alan Lee (Second edition)
- Subject: Middle-earth
- Genre: Atlas
- Publisher: Houghton Mifflin
- Publication date: 1981
- Publication place: United States
- Media type: Hardcover
- Pages: 190 (210 with notes)
- ISBN: 0-395-53516-6
- OCLC: 24142309
- Dewey Decimal: 823/.912 20
- LC Class: G3122.M5 F6 1991

The Atlas of Middle-earth by Karen Wynn Fonstad is an atlas of J. R. R. Tolkien's fictional realm of Middle-earth. It was published in 1981, following Tolkien's major works The Hobbit, The Lord of the Rings, and The Silmarillion. It provides many maps at different levels of detail, from whole lands to cities and individual buildings, and of major events like the Battle of the Pelennor Fields. The maps are grouped by period, namely the First, Second, and Third Ages of Middle-earth, with chapters on The Hobbit and The Lord of the Rings. A final chapter looks at geographic themes such as climate, vegetation, population, and languages around Middle-earth.

The atlas has been warmly received by Tolkien scholars, who have called it both authorized and magisterial, providing in particular a comprehensive set of thematic maps of Middle-earth.

== Context ==
Karen Wynn Fonstad earned a master's degree in Geography, specializing in cartography, from the University of Oklahoma, and worked as Director of Cartographic Services at the University of Wisconsin–Oshkosh before she focused on raising children and writing atlases of fictional worlds.

Middle-earth is the fictional world created by the philologist and fantasy author J. R. R. Tolkien and presented in his bestselling books The Hobbit (1937) and The Lord of the Rings (1954–1955). Tolkien provided overview maps for each book.

== Book ==
=== Publication history ===
The Atlas of Middle-earth was first published in hardback by Houghton Mifflin in the United States in 1981. A revised and updated second edition was published in 1991, after Christopher Tolkien had edited and published eight volumes of The History of Middle-earth following his father's death. HarperCollins republished the revised edition in London in 1994, reprinting it in 1999, 2016, and 2017.

=== Approach ===
Fonstad compares Gondor's Emyn Muil to the Weald of Kent (pictured), as it has a pair of inward-facing downs.

The Atlas of Middle-earth provides many detailed maps of the lands described in Tolkien's books. The maps are treated as if they are of real landscapes, drawn according to the rules of a real atlas. For each area the history of the land is taken into account, as well as geography on a larger scale; from there maps are drawn. Fonstad's discussion includes suggestions as to the geology that could explain various formations, and points that are contradictory between multiple accounts. Fonstad explains in the atlas, and in her article about it, how she came to decide on such matters. For example, she compares the western Emyn Muil with its two ridges to the Weald with its pair of inward-facing downs (an anticline).

City maps and floor plans for important buildings are included. For example, the city of Minas Tirith is mapped on a single page, the main map giving a perspective view of the whole city, while three insets show the nearly-circular plan of the city, a plan of the citadel in the innermost circle, and a labelled cutaway drawing of the White Tower at the centre of the citadel. A page of text describes the city's geography. Further maps are given of significant events, such as the Battle of the Pelennor Fields in front of Minas Tirith.

=== Content ===
The maps are organised first by period, with chapters on the First, Second, and Third Ages of Middle-earth. A chapter covers regional maps, and a short chapter focuses on The Hobbit. A major chapter follows the action in The Lord of the Rings. The book ends with a chapter of thematic maps, illustrating the landforms, climate, vegetation, population, and languages of Middle-earth.

== Reception ==
Fonstad created "the most comprehensive set" of thematic maps of Middle-earth, such as Frodo and Sam's route to Mount Doom to destroy the One Ring.

The Tolkien scholar Verlyn Flieger recorded that she persuaded Fonstad to write an account for Tolkien Studies of how she researched and created the maps for her Atlas of Middle-earth. Fonstad, while seriously ill, accordingly prepared her last article, "Writing 'TO' the Map" in her final months. Flieger stated "We mourn her passing and we honor her work". The editor of Tolkien Studies, David Bratman, said that the atlas provides historical, geological, and battle maps, with a detailed commentary and explanation of how Fonstad approached the mapping task from the available evidence. Michael Brisbois, also in Tolkien Studies, described the atlas as "authorized", while the cartographers Ina Habermann and Nikolaus Kuhn take Fonstad's maps as defining Middle-earth's geography. The Tolkien scholar Luke Shelton called the book the more popular of the two atlases of Middle-earth, the other being Barbara Strachey's more specific Journeys of Frodo. He said the book, while not perfect, "is certainly helpful", not least as it covers the First and Second Ages.

Stentor Danielson, a Tolkien scholar, said that Tolkien did not provide the same "detailed textual history" to contextualise his maps as he did for his writings. Danielson suggests that this has assisted the tendency among Tolkien's fans to treat his maps as "geographical fact". He called Fonstad's atlas "magisterial", and said that like Tolkien, Fonstad worked from the assumption that the maps, like the texts, "are objective facts" which the cartographer must fully reconcile. He gives as an instance the work that she did to make the journey of Thorin's company in The Hobbit consistent with the map, something that Tolkien found himself unable to do. Danielson wrote that in addition, Fonstad created "the most comprehensive set" of thematic maps of Middle-earth, presenting geographic data including political boundaries, climate, population density, and the routes of characters or armies.

Lewis Pulsipher, in Adventure Gaming magazine, called the atlas "a potential aid for role-playing gamemasters and boardgame designers first, and Tolkienana second." He described it as thoroughly researched and "the best predigested source of information". He remarks the inclusion in the atlas of analysis of such diverse matters as Middle-earth's climate, demography, battles, and the Fellowship's journeys.

== See also ==
- Tolkien's maps

== Sources ==
- Fonstad, Karen Wynn (1991). The Atlas of Middle-earth. Boston: Houghton Mifflin Harcourt. ISBN 0-618-12699-6.
