= William Sarjeant =

William Antony Swithin Sarjeant (15 July 1935 – 8 July 2002), also known by the pen name Antony Swithin, was a professor of geology at University of Saskatchewan. He was also interested in mystery writing, fantasy writing, folk singing, and heritage preservation. He received the Sue Tyler Friedman Medal in 1990 for his work in the history of geology.

Born in Sheffield, England, he wrote The Perilous Quest for Lyonesse series of novels (1990–1993) in the vein of The Lord of the Rings. They were set in a fictional land of Rockall based upon the small real island of the same name northwest of Scotland and Ireland.

Sarjeant died of cancer at age 66 in July 2002. Following his death, William Sarjeant Park in the city of Saskatoon's Willowgrove neighborhood was named in his honor.

== Writings ==
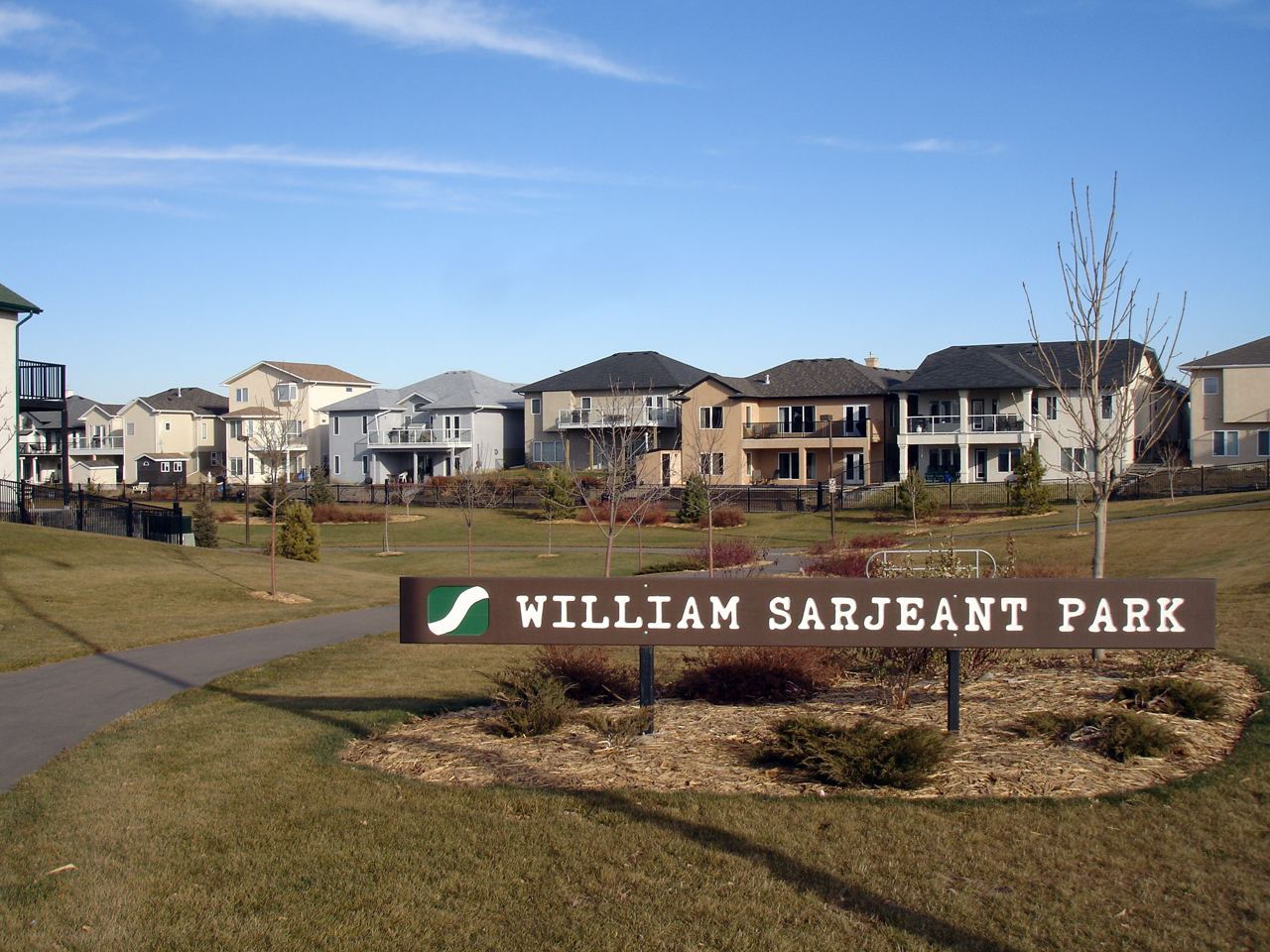
William Sarjeant Park in Willowgrove neighborhood

- Princes of Sandastre
- The Lords of the Stoney Mountains
- The Winds of the Wastelands
- The Nine Gods of Saffadne
- Sarjeant, William A. S. (1980). Geologists and the History of Geology. An International Bibliography from the Origins to 1978, 5 volumes. Arno Press. ISBN 978-0333293935.
