= Karen Wynn Fonstad =

American cartographer and academic

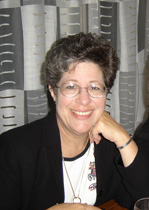
- Fonstad in 2004
- Born: Karen Lea Wynn; April 18, 1945; Oklahoma City, Oklahoma, US
- Died: March 11, 2005 (aged 59)
- Resting place: Forest Cemetery (Stevens Point, Wisconsin)
- Education: University of Oklahoma
- Occupations: Cartographer, academic
- Known for: Atlases of fictional worlds

Karen Lea Wynn Fonstad (April 18, 1945 – March 11, 2005) was an American cartographer and academic who designed several atlases of fictional worlds, including her 1981 The Atlas of Middle-earth, a geographic guide to J. R. R. Tolkien's high fantasy world.

== Early life and education ==
Karen Lea Wynn was born in Oklahoma City, Oklahoma, to parents James and Estis Wynn. She was raised in Norman, Oklahoma where her father ran a sheet metal shop. She graduated from Norman High School, and then earned a B.S. degree in Physical Therapy in 1967, from the University of Oklahoma. In 1968, she was among the first women accepted into the school's geography graduate program, where she wrote a style manual of cartographic symbology as her master's thesis. While at the University she met Todd A. Fonstad, also in the geography department. They married in 1970, and in 1971 moved to Wisconsin, where Todd taught at the University of Wisconsin–Oshkosh. They had two children.

== Mapping Middle-earth ==
A friend lent Fonstad a copy of Tolkien's work and she became enchanted. "I doubt if any other book or books will ever grasp my interest as much as these," she wrote in her journal in 1975. "Each time I finish a reading I immediately feel as if I hadn't read them for weeks and I am lonely for them — lonely for the characters within the books, the tremendously vivid descriptions, the whole essence." "Her son said she had read The Hobbit and The Lord of the Rings some 30 times before pitching the atlas." The Atlas of Middle-earth, published in 1981, provides detailed maps of the lands of Middle-earth. The maps are treated as if they are of real landscapes, drawn according to the rules of a real atlas, and taking into account each land's history and geology.

== Career ==
Before her "retirement" to raising children and writing companion atlases, Fonstad was Director of Cartographic Services at the University of Wisconsin–Oshkosh. Her formal acknowledgments for The Atlas of Pern (1984) include "my husband, Todd, associate professor geography" and the UW Oshkosh Department of Geography.

Fonstad also served on the Oshkosh City Planning Commission for twenty-four years, held positions on other civic boards, and held the offices of president and secretary for the UW-Oshkosh Faculty Dames.

== Death ==
Fonstad died, aged 59, from complications of breast cancer.

== Works ==
Fonstad's speciality was the creation of fictional atlases:

- The Atlas of Middle-earth (1981) ISBN 0-395-28665-4
  - Middle-earth, based on Tolkien's legendarium
- The Atlas of Pern (1984) ISBN 0-345-31434-4
  - Pern, based on the Dragonriders of Pern series by Anne McCaffrey
- The Atlas of the Land (1985) ISBN 0-345-31431-X
  - The Land, based on The Chronicles of Thomas Covenant by Stephen R. Donaldson
- The Atlas of the Dragonlance World (1987) ISBN 0-88038-448-4
  - Krynn, based on the DragonLance stories by Tracy Hickman and Margaret Weis (among others)
- The Forgotten Realms Atlas (1990) ISBN 0-88038-857-9
  - The Forgotten Realms, a setting for Dungeons & Dragons designed by Ed Greenwood, published by TSR
- The Atlas of Middle-earth: Revised Edition (1992) ISBN 0-395-53516-6
