= Fafnir (journal) =

- Language: English
- Edited by: Bodhisattva Chattopadhyay, Laura E. Goodin, Esko Suoranta

Publication details
- History: 2014-present
- Publisher: Suomen science fiction - ja fantasiatutkimuksen seura ry (Finland)
- Frequency: Semiannual
- Open access: Yes

Standard abbreviations
- ISO 4: Fafnir

Indexing
- ISSN: 2342-2009

Links
- Journal homepage; Online access; Online archive

Fafnir – Nordic Journal of Science Fiction and Fantasy Research is a peer-reviewed online academic journal published by the Finnish Society of Science Fiction and Fantasy Research (Finnish: Suomen science fiction - ja fantasiatutkimuksen seura ry).

The main language of the journal is English, but it also accepts submissions in the Nordic languages. Content ranges from research articles to short overviews, essays, interviews, opinion pieces, conference reports, and academic book reviews.

== Abstracting and indexing ==
The journal is abstracted and indexed in the Modern Language Association Database.
