= John Tolkien =

John Tolkien may refer to:

- J. R. R. Tolkien (1892–1973), author of The Hobbit (1937) and The Lord of the Rings (1954–1955)
- John Tolkien (priest) (1917–2003), J. R. R. Tolkien's son and priest
