= Mabel Suffield Tolkien =

J.R.R. Tolkien's mother (1870 – 1904)

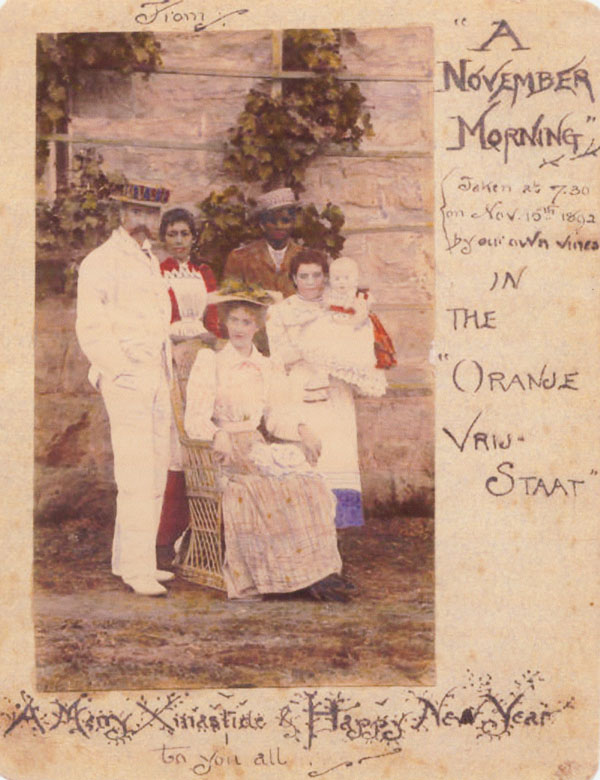
Mabel Tolkien (seated) in 1892 in Bloemfontein with her husband and infant son, John Ronald Reuel Tolkien, their 'house-boy' Isaak, and an unnamed maid

Mabel Tolkien (née Suffield, 1870 – 1904) was the mother of J.R.R. Tolkien. She acted as Tolkien's tutor both in early life and in preparation for grammar school, and was an influence on his life, faith, and writing. Tolkien traced his interest in philology and romance to her, and his awareness of her hard work and suffering for the sake of her sons, especially when she was rejected by her family because of her conversion to Catholicism, left a lasting impact on him, as did her early death.

== Life ==
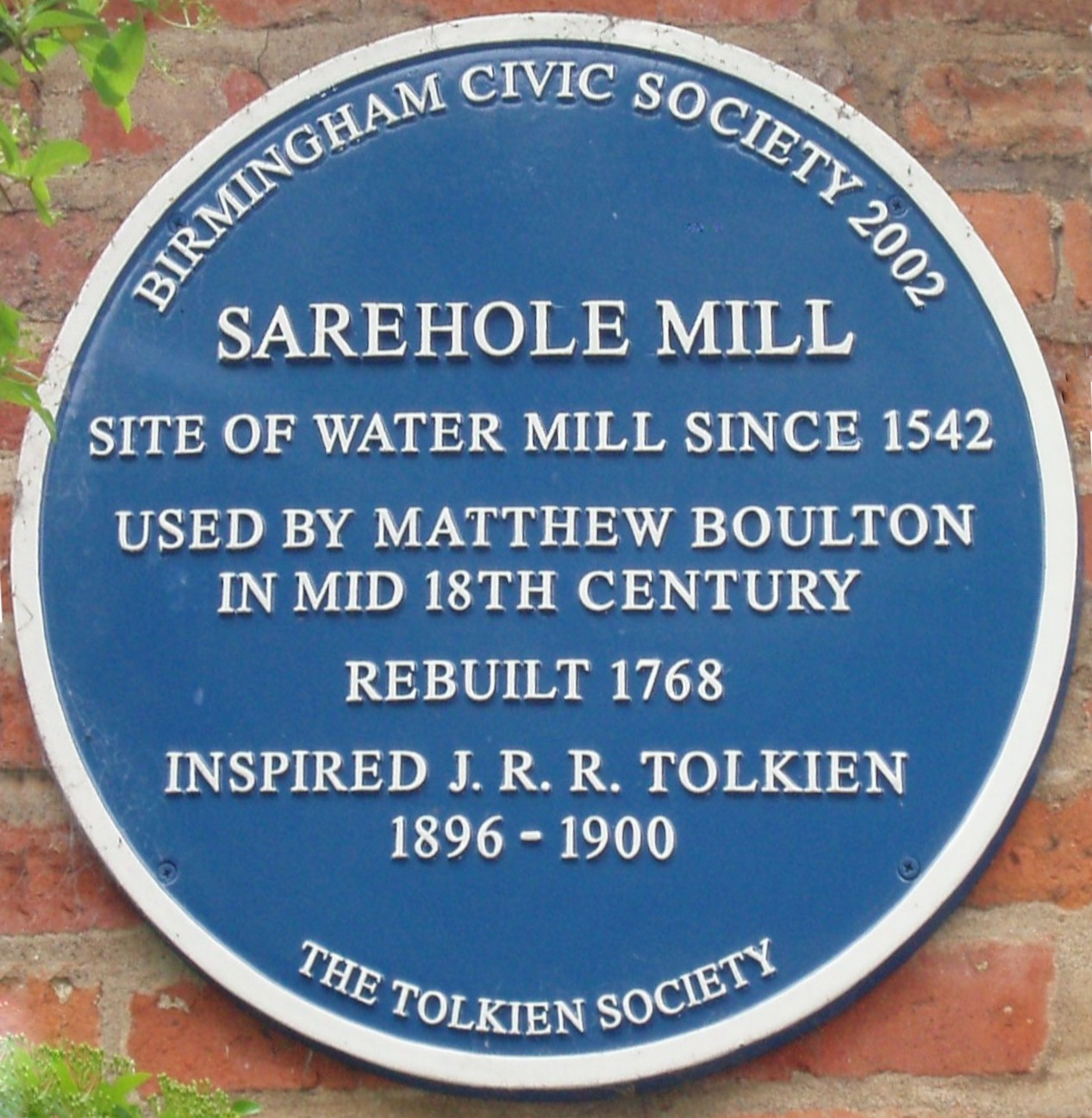
Blue plaque at Sarehole Mill noting the Tolkien family's time living nearby

Mabel Suffield was born in 1870 in Birmingham, the second daughter of John Suffield and his wife Emily, née Sparrow. The family was prosperous until Suffield's drapery business was closed when the site was redeveloped in 1886.

When Mabel was eighteen, she received a proposal of marriage from Arthur Tolkien, a bank clerk, who was thirteen years her senior. Her father did not allow a formal betrothal on the grounds that Mabel was too young and Arthur was unable to support her. Arthur moved to Bloemfontein, Orange Free State, to become the manager of the Bloemfontein branch of the Bank of Africa, and Mabel joined him in March 1891. They married in Cape Town on 16 April 1891.

The couple had two sons, John Ronald Reuel (b. 3 January 1892) and Hilary Arthur (b. 18 February 1894); J.R.R.'s health struggled in the Southern African climate. In April 1895, Mabel brought her sons to England for a visit. Arthur, who had remained in Bloemfontein to work, contracted rheumatic fever and died in February 1896. After staying with her parents, Mabel moved with her sons to a cottage near Sarehole Mill, Birmingham, which she rented by using the proceeds from Arthur's share in a gold mine and support from her family.

In 1900, Mabel and her sister May Incledon converted to Catholicism. Her family disapproved: her father (a Unitarian) disowned her, and her brother-in-law Walter Incledon (an Anglican), who had been assisting her financially, withdrew his support. May was forbidden by her husband to attend Catholic services, but Mabel persevered in her faith, taking her sons to Mass and arranging for them to attend a school conducted by the Birmingham Oratory, where she rented a house next door.

Mabel taught her sons to read and write, and then taught them Latin, French, botany, and drawing, and instructed them in the Catholic faith. She is credited with a talent and enthusiasm for languages, nature, calligraphy and etymology, which she passed on to Tolkien, although she was unable to interest him in her other strength, the piano. He cited her as the origin of his interest in philology and romance: "I am in fact far more of a Suffield (a family deriving from Evesham in Worcestershire), and it is to my mother who taught me (until I obtained a scholarship at the ancient Grammar School in Birmingham) that I owe my tastes for philology, especially of Germanic languages, and for romance."

She moved the family several times to facilitate Tolkien's education, withdrawing him from St Philip's School to tutor him herself when she realised that he was outpacing his classmates. She "set up a rigorous programme" in which she taught "all the subjects herself", except geometry, which was taught by one of her sisters. This led to his winning a Foundation Scholarship to King Edward's School in 1903. In 1904, Mabel was diagnosed with Type 1 diabetes. Her friend Father Francis Xavier Morgan, who lived nearby in the Oratory which conducted St Philip’s School, arranged for the family to rent rooms in the Oratory’s lodge cottage, where Mabel died in November 1904. Father Francis became the guardian of her sons.

== Influence on Tolkien ==
Tolkien wrote of his mother's influence on him to his son Michael: "Though a Tolkien by name, I am a Suffield by tastes, talents and upbringing... is in an indefinable way 'home' to me, as no other part of the world is. Your grandmother, to whom you owe so much – for she was a gifted lady of great beauty and wit, greatly stricken by God with grief and suffering, who died in youth (at 34) of a disease hastened by persecution of her faith..." His connection with the West Midlands and his artistic and calligraphic talents (the Suffields were platemakers, engravers, and booksellers, and Mabel taught Tolkien calligraphy) comes from his mother’s side of the family. His sense of the split between both sides of his heritage is thought to have contributed to the 'double-sided' nature of his character Bilbo Baggins, who traces some of his attributes to his maternal 'Tookish' side. 'The Old Took and his three remarkable daughters' is thought to be an allusion to Mabel and her family. Mabel's sister Jane Neave also owned a farm called Bag End, where Tolkien was sent to stay during Mabel's illness, which became the name of Bilbo's home.

Mabel's Catholic convictions had a lasting impact on Tolkien and his work; she lived to see him take his first communion. He said of her that "My own dear mother was a martyr indeed, and it is not to everybody that God grants to easy a way to His great gifts as He did to Hilary and myself, giving us a mother who killed herself with labour and trouble to ensure us keeping the faith."

== In popular culture ==
Mabel Tolkien was portrayed by Laura Donelly in the 2019 film Tolkien.

== Sources ==
- Carpenter, Humphrey (2011) [1977]. J. R. R. Tolkien: A Biography. HarperCollins. ISBN 978-0-00-738125-8.
- Carpenter, Humphrey, ed. (2023) [1981]. The Letters of J. R. R. Tolkien: Revised and Expanded Edition. New York: HarperCollins. ISBN 978-0-35-865298-4.
- Duriez, Colin (2012). J. R. R. Tolkien: The Making of a Legend. Lion Books. ISBN 978-0-7459-5514-8.
- Garth, John (2013). Tolkien and the Great War: The Threshold of Middle-earth. Houghton Mifflin Harcourt. ISBN 978-0-544-26372-7.
- Harper, Amelia (2013) [2007]. "Education". In Drout, Michael D. C. (ed.). The J. R. R. Tolkien Encyclopedia. New York: Taylor & Francis. p. 142. ISBN 978-0-415-96942-0.
- Heims, Neil (2013). J.R.R. Tolkien. Infobase Learning. ISBN 978-1-4381-4838-0.
- Lee, Stuart D. (2022). A Companion to J. R. R. Tolkien. John Wiley & Sons. ISBN 978-1-119-69140-2.
- Moseley, Charles (1995). J. R. R. Tolkien. Oxford University Press. ISBN 978-0-7463-0763-2.
- Pearce, Joseph (2019). Tolkien: Man and Myth. Ignatius Press. ISBN 978-1-64229-091-2.
- Tubbs, Patricia (2013) [2007]. "Suffield Family". In Drout, Michael D. C. (ed.). The J. R. R. Tolkien Encyclopedia. New York: Taylor & Francis. p. 628. ISBN 978-0-415-96942-0.
- Xander, Jesse (2021). The Real J.R.R. Tolkien: The Man Who Created Middle-Earth. White Owl. ISBN 978-1-5267-6516-1.
