= Francis Xavier Morgan =

Spanish-British priest (1857–1935)

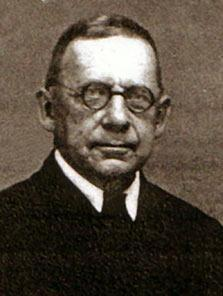
- Born: Francisco Javier Morgan y Osborne; 18 January 1857; El Puerto de Santa María, Cádiz, Spain
- Died: 11 June 1935 (aged 78); Birmingham, England
- Other name: tío Curro
- Education: University of Louvain
- Occupation: Priest (Oratory of Saint Philip Neri)
- Years active: 1883–1935
- Parent(s): Francis Morgan (father); María Manuela Osborne y Böhl de Faber (mother)

Francis Xavier Morgan C. O. (born Francisco Javier Morgan Osborne, 18 January 1857 – 11 June 1935) was a Spanish and British Catholic priest of the Oratory of Saint Philip Neri. He served for most of his priesthood at the Birmingham Oratory in Edgbaston. Decades after his death, Morgan has become famous as the teacher, legal guardian, and father figure to the fantasy author and academic J. R. R. Tolkien.

== Early years ==
Francisco Javier Morgan Osborne was the son of Francis Morgan, a Welsh merchant who had settled at El Puerto de Santa María in Andalusia as a vineyard owner and exporter of sherry, and María Manuela Osborne y Böhl de Faber, daughter of fellow British expatriate, Thomas Osborne Mann, founder of the wine business Bodegas Osborne. In keeping with Spanish naming customs, his birth surname "Morgan Osborne" or more properly "Morgan y Osborne" was his paternal and maternal surnames combined.

Through his maternal grandmother, the half-German, half-Spanish, Aurora Böhl de Faber, the future priest was the grandnephew of historical novelist Cecilia Böhl de Faber, whose immortal contributions to Spanish literature were concealed behind the male pseudonym "Fernán Caballero" and drew both wide praise and comparisons with the novels of Sir Walter Scott.

According to a 1987 lecture about Fr. Morgan's life by a fellow priest of the Birmingham Oratory, the elder Francis Morgan was a Welsh Protestant and María Manuela Osborne was a Catholic, which made theirs a disparity of cult marriage.

As a boy, Francis was sent to England, where he became only the third student to enter the primary school attached to the Birmingham Oratory, where his teachers included Father John Henry Newman. After primary school, Francis Morgan went to the Catholic grammar school run by Monsignor Thomas John Capel in London, and then entered the University of Louvain. After two years there he returned to the Birmingham Oratory as a novice.

In 1880 he accompanied Father John Norris, the prefect of the Birmingham Oratory, to Rome, where they were granted an audience with Pope Leo XIII. On his return, they both accompanied the newly appointed Cardinal Newman during his stay at the London residence of the Duke of Norfolk, a descendant of Recusants and the foremost Catholic in the English nobility, where polite society paid tribute to the Cardinal. After his ordination to the priesthood in 1883, Fr. Francis Morgan became an active member of the Birmingham Oratory community.

According to Fr. Philip Lynch of the Birmingham Oratory, "Fr. Francis was very interested in the Choir, and when the boy sopranos were in good voice he would describe their singing as drops of liquid gold. He would give Fr. Robert a cheque towards the Choir, expressed with certain criticisms and suggestions, which would not be adverted to. Fr. Francis had a pleasing tenor voice and did the Synagoga in all the sung Latin Passions in Holy Week for many years. When not on a public Mass, he always celebrated at Our Lady’s Altar. His room was the middle one on the front corridor, which he called his cell, but was too crowded to move easily round, including a moving bookcase in the centre. I personally had a fellow-feeling for him as a non-academic, whose sermons and doubts were undistinguished."

== Relationship with the Tolkiens ==
Although he initially taught at the Oratory school, he spent most of his life doing pastoral work in the parish run by the Oratorians. There he met a widow who had recently converted to Catholicism and who came to the Oratory for spiritual comfort: Mabel Tolkien (née Suffield), along with her children Ronald and Hilary. By September 1900 Mabel had managed to enroll Ronald at the prestigious King Edward's School in Birmingham, and on Sundays the family attended Mass at the Oratory.

In a 1965 letter to his son Michael, Tolkien recalled the influence of the man whom he always called "Father Francis": "He was an upper-class Welsh-Spaniard Tory, and seemed to some just a pottering old gossip. He was - and he was not. I first learned charity and forgiveness from him; and in the light of it pierced even the 'liberal' darkness out of which I came, knowing more about 'Bloody Mary' than the Mother of Jesus - who was never mentioned except as an object of wicked worship by the Romanists."

The Tolkiens had been living in a rather unstable situation since the death of the head of the family, Arthur Tolkien, who had worked in the Orange Free State as a branch manager of the Bank of Africa Limited. When their financial difficulties made it impossible for her to continue paying for Ronald's tuition at King Edward's School, Father Francis took him into the school run by the oratorians. Consequently, Mabel and her children moved close to the Oratory, to Oliver Road, and there the young boy remained in school until September 1903, when he won a scholarship to return to King Edward's School.

In April 1904 Mabel Tolkien fell seriously ill with diabetes, having great difficulty fending for herself. Father Francis arranged for her to rent two rooms in a cottage in Rednal, to the south of Birmingham, near the estate where the Oratorians had their cemetery and a retreat house. There Mabel would have the landlady's help with the housework; the landlady would also provide food, and the children could enjoy the countryside setting of the Lickey Hills. Rednal seems to have inspired Ronald's imaginary Rivendell.

In November 1904, seven months after being diagnosed with diabetes, Mabel Tolkien died at Rednal cottage in the care of Father Francis. In her will she appointed him legal guardian of her two children. The financial means the late Mrs. Tolkien left for the upbringing of the children were rather meagre, but Father Francis was to supplement them with money from his share of his family's sherry business in El Puerto de Santa Maria.

Father Francis took the Tolkien brothers to live with him at the Oratory. The library that the priest kept in his cell was frequently used by Ronald, who learned some Castilian Spanish from his guardian, which enabled him to create a language he called "naffarin". In all probability, thanks to Father Francis' library the young Tolkien had access to the Castilian historical novels of Cecilia Böhl de Faber, the priest's great-aunt, who published under the pseudonym Fernán Caballero. This has been suggested because of the similarity between Gollum's second riddle in The Hobbit concerning the wind, and Fernán Caballero's 187th riddle. (Note: Fernán Caballero's 187th riddle is: "Vuela sin alas, silva sin boca, azota sin manos, y tú ni lo ves ni lo tocas." In English: "Flies wingless, hisses/whistles mouthless, lashes handless, and you neither see it nor touch it." This has been compared to Gollum's second riddle: "Voiceless it cries, Wingless flutters, Toothless bites, Mouthless mutters." From Fernán Caballero's Cuentos, oraciones, adivinanzas y refranes populares (Madrid, 1877).)

Soon after taking them in, Father Francis allowed Ronald and Hilary to live with a sister-in-law of their late mother, Beatrice Suffield. After three years, the priest realised that Mrs Suffield, widowed and deeply depressed, could not offer the most suitable environment for the Tolkien brothers to grow up in. He looked for something more like a home for them, and so he decided to put them up in Mrs Faulkner's boarding house, right next door to the Oratory. Ronald, aged 16, met Edith Bratt, aged 19, who had been living alone with Mrs Faulkner since the death of their mother, and a romantic relationship began between the two teenagers.

Possibly because of the disparity of cult marriage between his own parents, Father Francis Morgan considered it "altogether unfortunate" that his surrogate son was romantically involved with an older, Protestant woman. Tolkien later wrote that "the combined tensions" of having a serious romantic relationship in his teens nearly caused, "a very bad breakdown" and are the reason why he "muffed [his] exams" to enter Oxford University. Fr. Morgan accordingly prohibited him from meeting, talking to, or even corresponding with Edith until he was 21. Tolkien obeyed this prohibition to the letter, with one notable early exception, over which Father Morgan threatened to cut short his university career if he did not stop.

In a 1941 letter to his son Michael Tolkien, Tolkien recalled, "I had to choose between disobeying and grieving (or deceiving) a guardian who had been a father to me, more than most father's, but without any obligation, and 'dropping' the love affair until I was 21. I don't regret my decision, though it was particularly hard on my lover. But that was not my fault. She was perfectly free and under no vow to me, and I should have had no just complaint (except according to the unreal romantic code) if she had got married to someone else."

Father Francis again found new lodgings for the two boys, this time with the McSherry family, parishioners of the Oratory. From there, Ronald successfully retook his exams to enter Oxford University, after which he moved to Oxford, but on the very day when he became a legal adult, wrote and successfully proposed marriage to Edith. According to the couple's children John and Priscilla, "Their respective guardians were not enthusiastic, although Father Francis eventually gave his blessing."

John and Priscilla Tolkien later wrote that while their father was attending Oxford, "Father Francis sometimes came to visit from Birmingham, once chaperoning Edith. She remembered the train stopping at Banbury and Father Francis insisted upon buying Banbury cakes - the local delicacy - which were very greasy. The grease got everywhere and caused considerable confusion."

After the couple's marriage and Tolkien's return from active service during the Battle of the Somme, Father Francis came to from Birmingham to Cheltenham in November 1917 to Baptize their first child, who was named John Francis Reuel Tolkien in his honour.

== Death and legacy ==
According to Fr. Philip Lynch, "Fr. Francis only went home every alternate year, as getting out there was such a business - booking a cabin to Gibraltar there and back on a P&O liner, or other such, and then the long journey by diligence to Puerto de Santa Maria. On one occasion towards the end of his life, Fr. Francis and his bachelor brother, Augustus, who lived in Spain, went to Palestine to see their sister, who had been a Reparatrice nun in Jerusalem for many years and wasn't very good at English. When they got there, they found that she had gone stone deaf. On some of the years that he did not go to Spain to visit the tribe - as he used to say - Fr. Francis would spend a week or so at Rednal."

Also in his later life, Father Francis often travelled from Birmingham to Dorsetshire in the summers to spend seaside holidays with J.R.R. and Edith Tolkien and their children at Lyme Regis. According to Humphrey Carpenter, Father Francis would sometimes embarrass the Tolkiens' children, "with his loud and boisterous ways just as he had embarrassed Ronald and Hilary at Lyme twenty-five years before."

Francis Xavier Morgan died inside his room at the Birmingham Oratory at the age of 78 in 1935. He left each of the Tolkien brothers £1,000 as an inheritance (equivalent to £61000 in 2025). According to Fr. Philip Lynch, "The Oratory was a duller place without him."

In a 1972 letter to his son Michael Tolkien, J. R. R. Tolkien wrote, "I remember after the death of Fr. Francis my 'second father'... saying to C.S. Lewis: 'I feel like a lost survivor into a new alien world after the real world has passed away.'"

== In popular culture ==
- Father Francis Morgan was portrayed onscreen by Irish actor Colm Meaney in Dome Karukoski's 2019 biographical film Tolkien. In a 2019 movie review, Tolkien scholar Joseph Pearce, who had previously expressed concern about the film's potentially negative depiction of Father Francis Morgan, instead praised the film. Pearce wrote, "It is the characterization of Fr. Francis Morgan which surprised me most. There’s none of the anti-Catholic bigotry that one has come to expect in the characterization of priests in contemporary cinema. He shines forth as a compassionate father-figure, which is how Tolkien described him in his letters, who has Tolkien’s best interests in mind at all times, even and especially at those times when he appears most harsh, such as his decision to forbid Tolkien from seeing Edith."

== Sources ==
- Carpenter, Humphrey (1977). Tolkien: A Biography. New York: Ballantine Books. ISBN 978-0-04-928037-3.
- Carpenter, Humphrey; Tolkien, Christopher, eds. (1981). The Letters of J. R. R. Tolkien. London: George Allen & Unwin. ISBN 978-0-04-826005-5.
