= Priscilla Reuel Tolkien =

British literary preservationist (1929–2022)

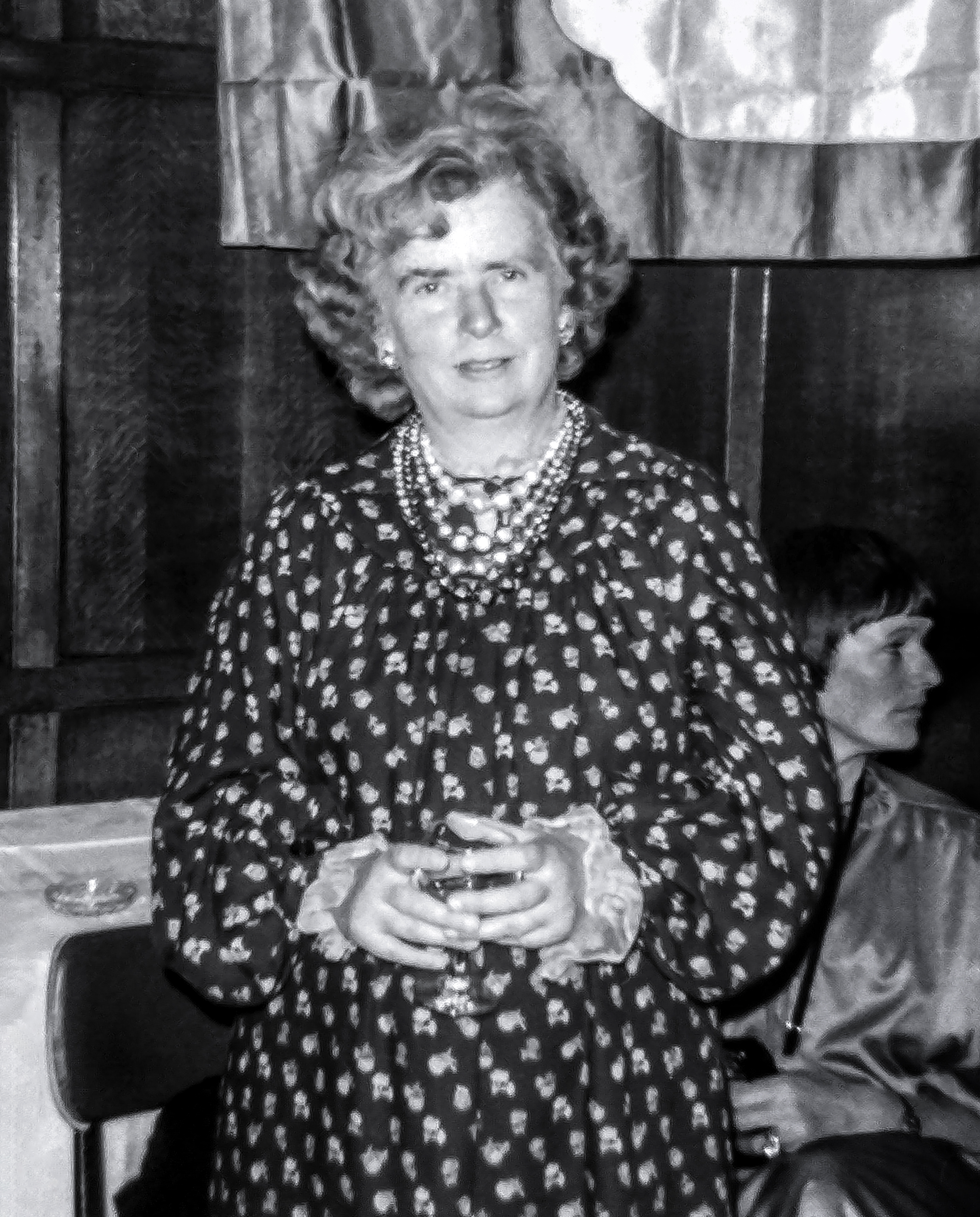
- Portrait of Tolkien in attendence at a members' event for The Tolkien Society at the Eastgate Hotel during Oxonmoot, 1979
- Born: Priscilla Mary Anne Reuel Tolkien; 18 June 1929; Northmoor Road, Oxford, England
- Died: 28 February 2022 (aged 92)
- Education: Lady Margaret Hall, B.A., English
- Occupations: Probation officer; Teacher
- Years active: 1943–2022
- Era: Long twentieth century
- Employers: University of Oxford; High Wycombe College; Beechlawn Tutorial College
- Notable work: The Tolkien Family Album
- Parents: J. R. R. Tolkien (father); Edith Tolkien (mother)
- Relatives: Mabel (paternal grandmother); John (brother); Christopher (brother); Simon (nephew)
- Family: Tolkien

Priscilla Reuel Tolkien (18 June 1929 – 28 February 2022) was a British literary preservationist and the youngest child of J. R. R. Tolkien.

== Life ==
Priscilla Tolkien was born on 18 June 1929, to J. R. R. Tolkien (1892–1973) and his wife, Edith Tolkien (1889–1971), being their youngest child and only daughter.

J. R. R. Tolkien was devoted to his children and sent them illustrated letters from Father Christmas when they were young.

When Priscilla was 14 years old, she helped her father by typing out some early chapters of The Lord of the Rings. The name of Frodo Baggins in the fourth draft of The Lord of the Rings was Bingo Bolger-Baggins, which was derived from a family of toy bears owned by Priscilla. She completed her B.A. degree in English at Lady Margaret Hall, Oxford, in 1951.

In July–August 1955, she accompanied her father on a two-week holiday in Italy. In the same year, she moved out of her parents' house but still saw them frequently. She lived in Oxford and worked as a probation officer and social worker in the city. Also in the 1950s, Priscilla worked for the respected social worker and Warden of the Bristol University Settlement, Hilda Jennings, as her secretary. Jennings, recognising Priscilla's promise, gave her jobs "beyond the scope of secutarial work", which promoted her return to university at the LSE in 1957.

Priscilla Tolkien died on 28 February 2022, unmarried, at the age of 92. She was the last living child of J. R. R. Tolkien.

== Tolkien legacy ==
Tolkien wrote his last letter to Priscilla in August 1973. She was, until her death, the honorary vice-president of the Tolkien Society. She wrote an article titled "My Father the Artist" in December 1976 for Amon Hen, the bulletin of the Tolkien Society. After her eldest brother, John, returned to Oxford in 1987, the siblings began identifying and cataloging the large collection of family photographs. In 1992, she and John published the book The Tolkien Family Album, containing pictures of the Tolkien family, to celebrate the 100th birth anniversary of their father. The same year she unveiled a plaque at the Anglican Cathedral of St. Andrew and St. Michael commemorating the hundredth anniversary of her father's birth at Bloemfontein, then in the Orange Free State. She launched the special Tolkien edition Royal Mail stamps commemorating her father's works in February 2004. In 2012, she, along with a coalition of British publishers, sued Warner Brothers for US$80 million in her capacity as a trustee of The Tolkien Trust, accusing them of exploiting Middle-earth characters to promote online gambling.
