= John Tolkien (priest) =

Roman Catholic priest and son of J.R.R. Tolkien

- Born: John Francis Reuel Tolkien; 16 November 1917; Cheltenham, England
- Died: 22 January 2003 (aged 85)
- Education: Dragon School; The Oratory School; English College, Rome; Exeter College, Oxford (BA)
- Occupations: Priest, chaplain
- Parents: J. R. R. Tolkien (father); Edith Tolkien (mother)
- Relatives: Christopher Tolkien (brother); Priscilla Tolkien (sister)
- Years active: 1946–1994

Ecclesiastical career
- Religion: Christianity
- Church: Roman Catholic Church
- Ordained: 1946
- Congregations served: St Mary and St Benedict Church, Coventry (1946–1950); English Martyrs Church, Sparkhill (1950–1957); Knutton Roman Catholic Church (1957–1966); Our Lady and St Peter, Stoke-on-Trent (1966–1987); St Peter's Catholic Church, Eynsham (1987–1994)

John Francis Reuel Tolkien (16 November 1917 – 22 January 2003) was an English Roman Catholic priest and the eldest son of J. R. R. Tolkien. He served as a parish priest in Oxford, Coventry, Birmingham, and Stoke-on-Trent. He was also a chaplain at the University College of North Staffordshire and to two schools, as well as a governor of St Joseph's College. During his lifetime and after his death, there were a number of allegations of child sexual abuse against him: he was questioned by the police but never charged or convicted.

== Biography ==
=== Early life ===
John Francis Reuel Tolkien was born in Cheltenham on 16 November 1917 to J. R. R. Tolkien and Edith Tolkien. His middle name "Francis" was in honour of Father Francis Xavier Morgan who had baptised him and served as his father's legal guardian. He received his formal education at the Dragon School, Oxford and The Oratory School in Caversham, Berkshire where he decided to become a priest during his final year. Acting on the advice of the Archbishop he decided to study English at Exeter College, Oxford from where he received his B.A. degree in 1939. In November 1939, he went to the English College, Rome. Due to the outbreak of World War II, the college was moved to Stonyhurst in Lancashire. He also studied Old Norse from his father in Oxford.

In 2019, The Observer reported that a tape-recorded conversation allegedly with John Francis Reuel Tolkien was heard by one of its journalists, in which "a man said to be him is heard discussing his childhood during the 1920s" and stated that he was a victim of sexual abuse by at least one of his father's colleagues as a child.

=== Clerical career ===
He was ordained as a priest at St Gregory and Augustine Church in North Oxford. He first served as a curate from 1946 to 1950 at the St Mary and St Benedict Church in Coventry, teaching 60 children every week and organising efforts for rebuilding the church's schools. From 1950 to 1957, he was a curate at the English Martyrs Church in Sparkhill, Birmingham. He later went to north Staffordshire, where he served as the chaplain of University College of North Staffordshire (now Keele University) and of two grammar schools namely, St Joseph's College in Trent Vale and St Dominic's High School in Hartshill.

In 1957, he moved to Knutton where he stayed until 1966, serving as the parish priest of the Knutton Roman Catholic Church during this period, before shifting to Hartshill. He became the parish priest of Our Lady of the Angels and St Peter in Chains Church, Stoke-on-Trent in 1966. He held the position until 1987 and a new school was constructed under his watch. He returned to Oxford in 1987 and settled in Eynsham, serving as the parish priest at its St. Peter's Catholic Church until he retired in 1994. A parish hall of the church is named after him as it was built because of his support.

=== Other activities ===
Tolkien also served as a governor of St Joseph's College and was the scoutmaster of the 159th English Martyrs Scout Group in Sparkhill. He was also a benefactor to the Elizabeth Trust charity of Newcastle and had a shelter for victims of sexual abuse named after him in 1990.

In 1987, he and his sister Priscilla began identifying the large collection of family photographs. In 1992, they released a book titled The Tolkien Family Album containing photographs and memories of the Tolkien family and giving an account of their father's life to celebrate the centenary birth anniversary of J. R. R. Tolkien.

=== Death ===
Before his death, Tolkien had started suffering from dementia. He died on 22 January 2003 after suffering from declining health for years.

== Child sexual abuse allegations ==
Allegations of child sexual abuse against Tolkien were first reported to the police in 1994, but no action was taken. The allegations were never proven nor was Tolkien convicted. He had denied the allegations while he was still alive. The Sunday Mercury made allegations against him in an article published soon after his death in January 2003, but was censured by the Press Complaints Commission for presenting them as facts when they had never been proven in a court of law.

The West Midlands Police began their enquiry and interviewed alleged witnesses after Christopher Carrie, one of the accusers, contacted them in 2001. A file was sent to the Crown Prosecution Service (CPS) in December 2001 and Tolkien was informally questioned in January 2002. In February 2002, the CPS decided not to charge him because of his ill health. Vincent Nichols, then Archbishop of Birmingham, authorised a payment of £15,000 in an out-of-court settlement to Carrie without admission of liability in 2003 after the archdiocese was sued by him. Lawyers representing the archdiocese had concluded that Carrie was "likely to satisfy the (civil) court, Fr Tolkien abused him in the manner he alleges."

Tolkien was one of four Catholic priests in Birmingham included as part of a wider investigation into the Catholic church by the Independent Inquiry into Child Sexual Abuse. Counsel to the Inquiry, Jacqueline Carey, stated that Archbishop of Birmingham Maurice Couve de Murville was made aware of an allegation made against Tolkien about him forcing scouts to strip naked during the 1950s, and had made a note about it in 1993. She added that this note seemed to be based on another note from 1968 and Tolkien seemed to have admitted to being responsible, but De Murville never reported the matter to the authorities. However, the original 1968 note no longer existed at the time of the trial.

At a hearing of the Inquiry, a lawyer representing the accusers claimed that diocesan documents showed Nichols being aware of allegations involving Tolkien, but deciding to reach a settlement in order to avoid disclosing them. Nichols apologised in November 2018 stating, "Often in the past we failed to respond promptly and vigorously to the cries and accounts of victims. We followed our instincts in trusting those fellow priests who were in fact criminals." In December 2018, he denied that he covered up the 1968 accusation since he had revealed it to the police during their enquiry and was only trying to avoid civil action, but admitted that he was wrong in not revealing the accusation to Tolkien's accusers. He also stated that he was contacted by lawyers acting on behalf of the Tolkien family who did not want the archdiocese to reach a settlement or accept liability, as Tolkien could not defend himself.

== See also ==
- Child sexual abuse in the Roman Catholic Church
- Tolkien family

== Bibliography ==
- Carpenter, Humphrey (2014). J. R. R. Tolkien: A Biography. Houghton Mifflin Harcourt. ISBN 978-0-54752-442-9.
- Drout, Michael D. C., ed. (2006). J. R. R. Tolkien Encyclopedia. Routledge. ISBN 978-1-13588-034-7.
- Tolkien, John and Tolkien, Priscilla. The Tolkien Family Album. HarperCollins, 1992.
