= Tolkien (disambiguation) =

J. R. R. Tolkien (1892–1973) was a famous British author and philologist, best known for The Lord of the Rings.

Tolkien is a surname. Notable people with the surname include:

- Edith Tolkien (1889–1971), J. R. R. Tolkien's wife
- John Tolkien (1917–2003), priest, J. R. R. Tolkien's eldest son
- Christopher Tolkien (1924–2020), J. R. R. Tolkien's third and youngest son
- Priscilla Tolkien (1929–2022), probation officer, J. R. R. Tolkien's daughter and youngest child
- Simon Tolkien (born 1959), writer, Christopher Tolkien's son
- Tim Tolkien (born 1962), sculptor, J. R. R. Tolkien's great-nephew
- Richard Tolkien (born 1955), British businessman and sailor

Tolkien may also refer to:

- Tolkien Estate, the legal body that owns the rights to J. R. R. Tolkien's works
- The Tolkien Trust, a charity managing the income from the Tolkien Estate
- The Tolkien Society, an educational charity and literary society devoted to the life and works of J. R. R. Tolkien
- The Tolkien Ensemble, a Danish band who perform interpretations of J. R. R. Tolkien's works
- Tolkien (film), a 2019 American biographical drama about J. R. R. Tolkien
- 2675 Tolkien, an asteroid named after J. R. R. Tolkien
- J.R. Tolkien (schooner), a gaff-topsail schooner of Netherlands registry
- Tolkien (crater), a crater on Mercury
- Tolkien Black, a character from South Park, previously known as Token Black and Token Williams
- Tolkien Peak, a summit in the Cadwallader Range, British Columbia, Canada
- Tolkien Sewer, a brook in the Pevensey Levels in East Sussex, UK

== See also ==
- Tolkien family
- Tolkin
- Toelken
