= Tolkien family =

English family of German origin

Tolkien
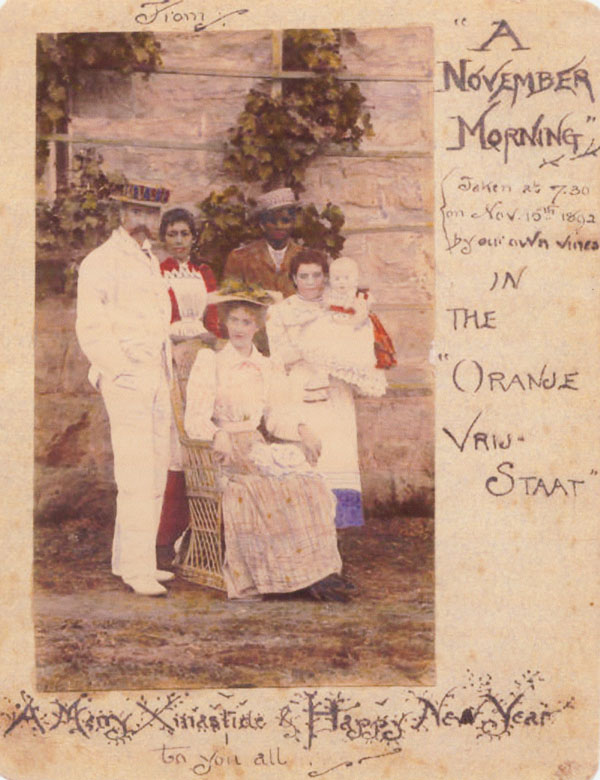
- Tolkien family
- Current region: Germany, England
- Origin: Kreuzburg, East Prussia
- Members: J. R. R. Tolkien

The Tolkien family is an English family of German descent whose best-known member is J. R. R. Tolkien, Oxford academic and author of the fantasy books The Hobbit, The Lord of the Rings and The Silmarillion.

== Etymology ==
According to Polish linguist Ryszard Derdziński the Tolkien name is of Low Prussian origin and probably means "son/descendant of Tolk", with Tolk meaning interpreter or negotiator and originating as a nickname. Another theory is that it is derived from the village of Tolkynen in East Prussia. J. R. R. Tolkien suggested the name was derived from the German adjective tollkühn, meaning foolhardy. Several people with the surname Tolkien or similar spelling, some of them members of the same family as J. R. R. Tolkien, live in northern Germany, but most of them are descendants of recent refugees from East Prussia who fled the Red Army invasion (1945). J. R. R. Tolkien's own knowledge of the family history was limited to its 18th-century German origin, according to Derdziński in part because he was "early isolated from the family of his prematurely deceased father."

== Family origins ==
The Tolkien family originated in the East Prussian town Kreuzburg (now Slavskoye, Russia) near Königsberg, where the Tolkien name is attested since the 16th century. The verified paternal line of J. R. R. Tolkien starts with Michel Tolkien, born around 1620 in Kreuzburg. Michel's son Christianus Tolkien (1663–1746) was a wealthy miller in Kreuzburg. His son Christian Tolkien (1706–1791) moved from Kreuzburg to nearby Danzig, and his two sons Daniel Gottlieb Tolkien (1747–1813) and Johann (later known as John) Benjamin Tolkien (1752–1819) emigrated to London in the 1770s, and became the ancestors of the English family. The family first appears in English records in 1777. In 1792 John Benjamin Tolkien and William Gravell took over the Erdley Norton manufacture in London, which from then on sold clocks and watches under the name Gravell & Tolkien. Daniel Gottlieb obtained British citizenship in 1794, but John Benjamin apparently never became a British citizen. Their German nephew Daniel Gottlieb Bergmann also joined them in London. Johann (John) Benjamin Tolkien, who died in London in 1819, was the 2nd great-grandfather of J. R. R. Tolkien.

== Notable members ==
=== J. R. R. Tolkien ===
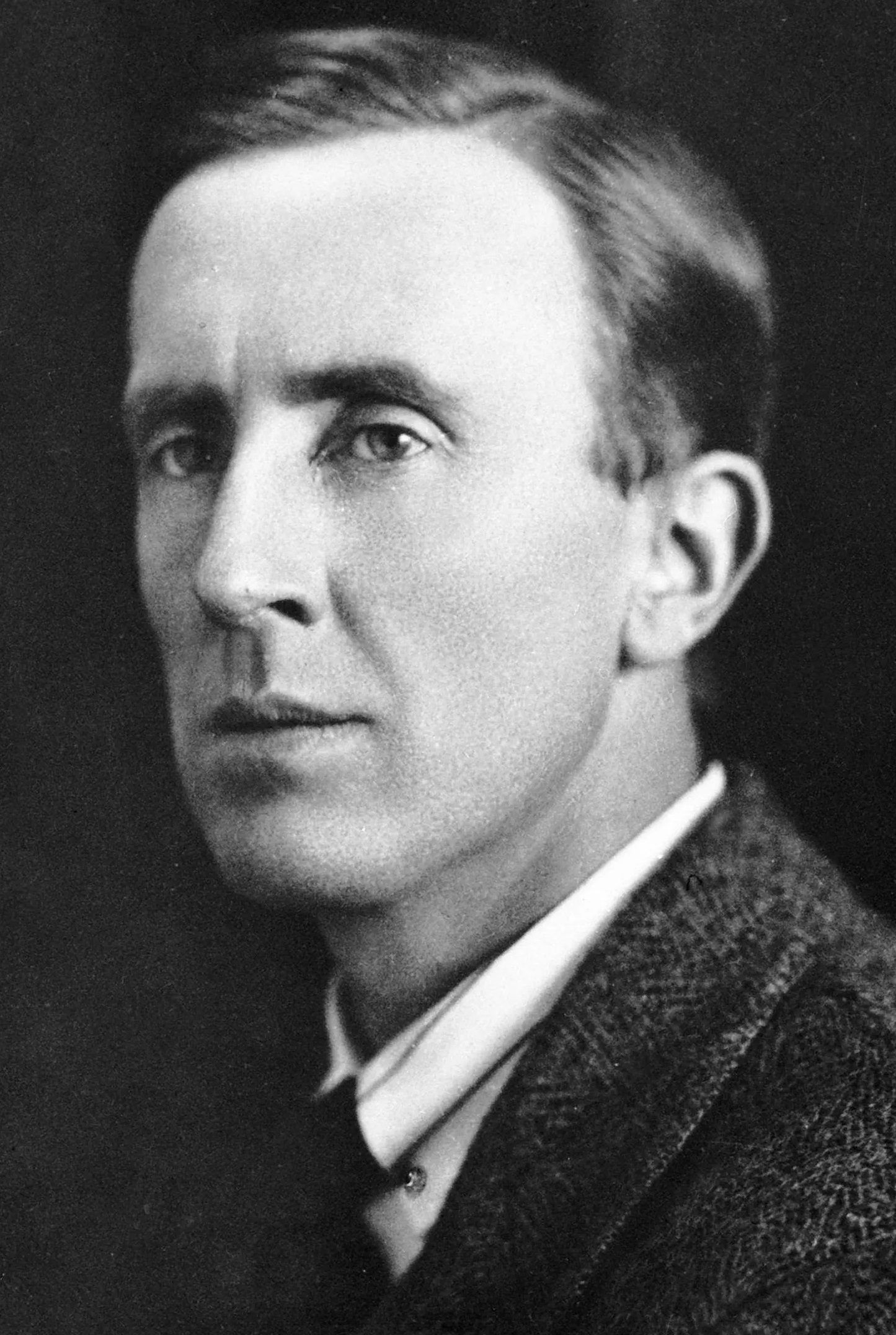
J. R. R. Tolkien

John Ronald Reuel Tolkien CBE (3 January 1892 – 2 September 1973) was an English philologist, writer and professor at the University of Oxford. He was a devout Catholic.

Much of Tolkien's published fiction is a connected body of tales, fictional histories, invented languages, and literary essays about an imagined world called Arda, and Middle-earth (derived from the Old English word middangeard, the lands inhabitable by humans) in particular, loosely identified as an "alternative" remote past of our own world. Tolkien applied the word legendarium to the totality of these writings. Most of the "legendarium" was edited and posthumously published by his son Christopher.

While Tolkien was preceded by other fantasy authors, his enduringly popular and successful works have had a remarkable influence on the genre. Thus he has been popularly identified as the "father of modern fantasy literature", or to be precise, high fantasy. L. Sprague de Camp and others consider him the father of modern fantasy together with sword and sorcery author Robert E. Howard (creator of Conan the Barbarian).

=== Arthur Tolkien ===
Arthur Reuel Tolkien (c. 18 February 1857 – 15 February 1896), the father of author J. R. R. Tolkien, was born in Handsworth, Staffordshire, England (now a suburb of Birmingham). He was the eldest child of John Benjamin Tolkien and Mary Jane Stow, who had married on 16 February 1856 in All Saints Parish Church, Birmingham, Warwickshire, England.

Arthur's father had previously been married to Jane Holmwood, with whom he had four children: Emily (b. 1838), Louisa (b. 1840), John Benjamin (b. 1845), and Jane (b. 1846). His father had been a piano teacher and tuner, as well as a music seller, but he had gone bankrupt in 1877, when he was described as "John Benjamin Tolkien, of High-street, Birmingham, in the county of Warwick, Pianoforte and Music Seller".

Arthur did not follow his father into the traditional Tolkien trade in pianos, which many of his London cousins also followed; instead he became a bank clerk and ended up moving to Bloemfontein in the Orange Free State (now part of South Africa), where he became manager of the Bloemfontein branch of the Bank of Africa. A furniture shop now occupies the Bradlow's Building on the site where the bank once stood, on the corner of West Burger and Maitland Streets.

Arthur was later joined by his fiancée, Mabel Suffield. They were married on 16 April 1891 at the St. George's Cathedral, Cape Town, Cape Colony (later Cape Province, South Africa). Two children: John Ronald Reuel (b. 1892) and Hilary Arthur Reuel (b. 1894) followed, and the family lived next door to the bank.

Mabel Tolkien felt the English climate would be better for the boys' health and returned to England with them in 1895. Arthur remained in South Africa, where he died of severe haemorrhage following rheumatic fever, on 15 February 1896, before he had the opportunity to join his family in England. He is buried in President Brand Cemetery, on the corner of Church and Rhodes Avenues, Bloemfontein.

=== Mabel Tolkien ===
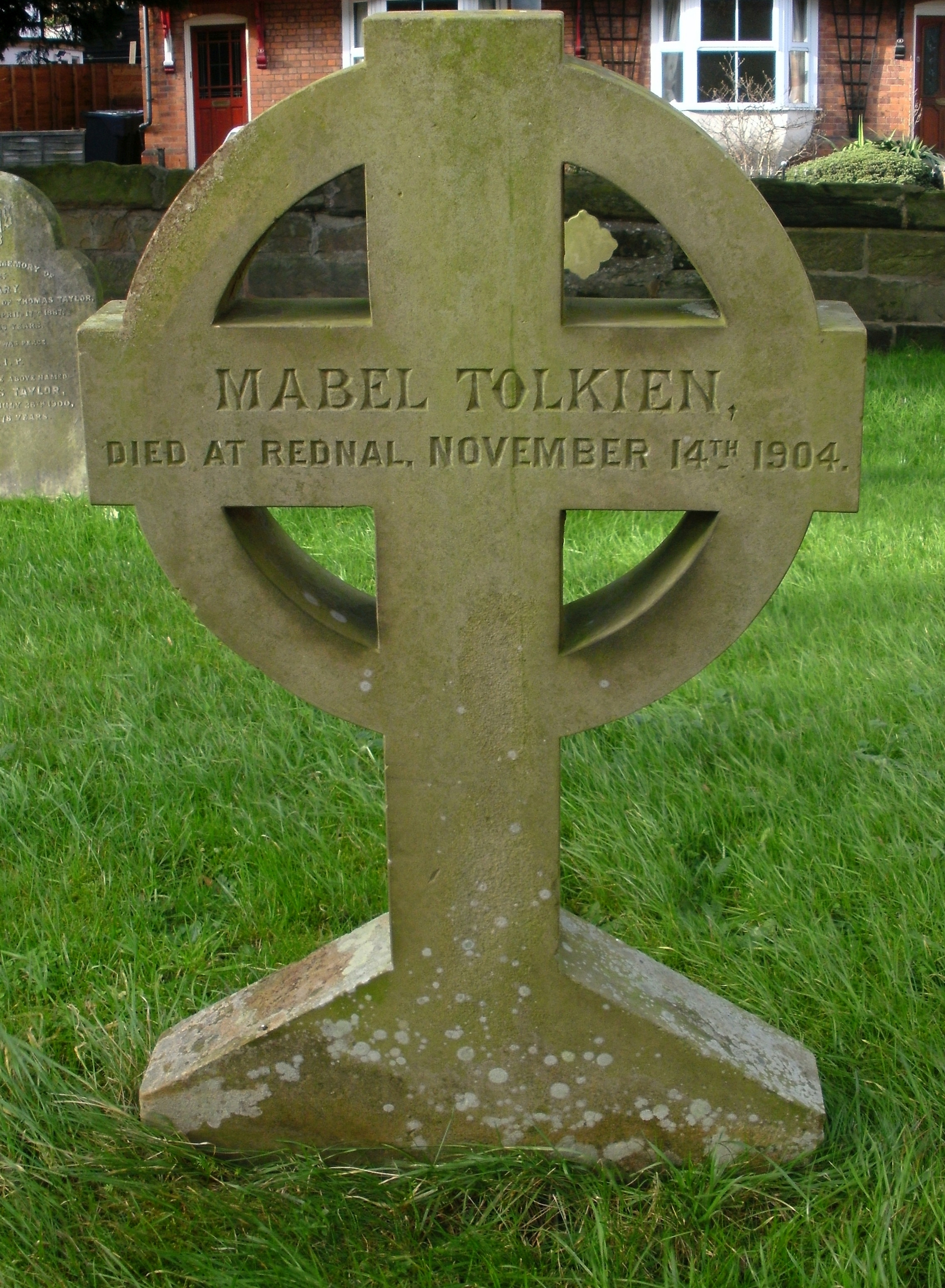
St Peter's Catholic Church, Bromsgrove: grave of Mabel Tolkien (1870–1904)

Mabel Tolkien (née Suffield; 1870 – 14 November 1904) was the mother of J. R. R. Tolkien. Her parents, John Suffield and Emily Jane Sparrow, lived in Stirling Road, Birmingham and owned a shop in the city centre. The Suffield family had a business in a building called Lamb House since 1812. From 1812 William Suffield ran a book and stationery shop there; Tolkien's great-grandfather, also John Suffield, was there from 1826 with a drapery and hosiery business.

Her husband Arthur Tolkien's death in South Africa in 1896 left her and their two young sons without a source of income. At first, they lived with her parents in Birmingham, then moved to Sarehole (now in Hall Green), then a Worcestershire village, later annexed to Birmingham.

Mabel tutored her two sons, and J. R. R. (Ronald, as he was known in the family) was a keen pupil. She taught him a great deal of botany, and she awakened in her son the enjoyment of the look and feel of plants. But his favourite lessons were those concerning languages, and his mother taught him the rudiments of Latin very early. She also taught him how to write, and her ornate script influenced her son's handwriting in his later life.

Mabel Tolkien converted to Catholicism in 1900 despite vehement protests by her Baptist family who then stopped all financial assistance to her. She died of acute complications of diabetes in 1904 at about 34 years of age, after having been diagnosed with diabetes earlier that year. At that time, there was no treatment for Type 1 diabetes – insulin was not discovered until two decades later. Tolkien was twelve, and they were living at Fern Cottage in Rednal, which they were then renting. For the rest of his life Tolkien felt that she had become a martyr for her faith, which had a profound effect on his own Catholic beliefs.

=== Edith Tolkien ===
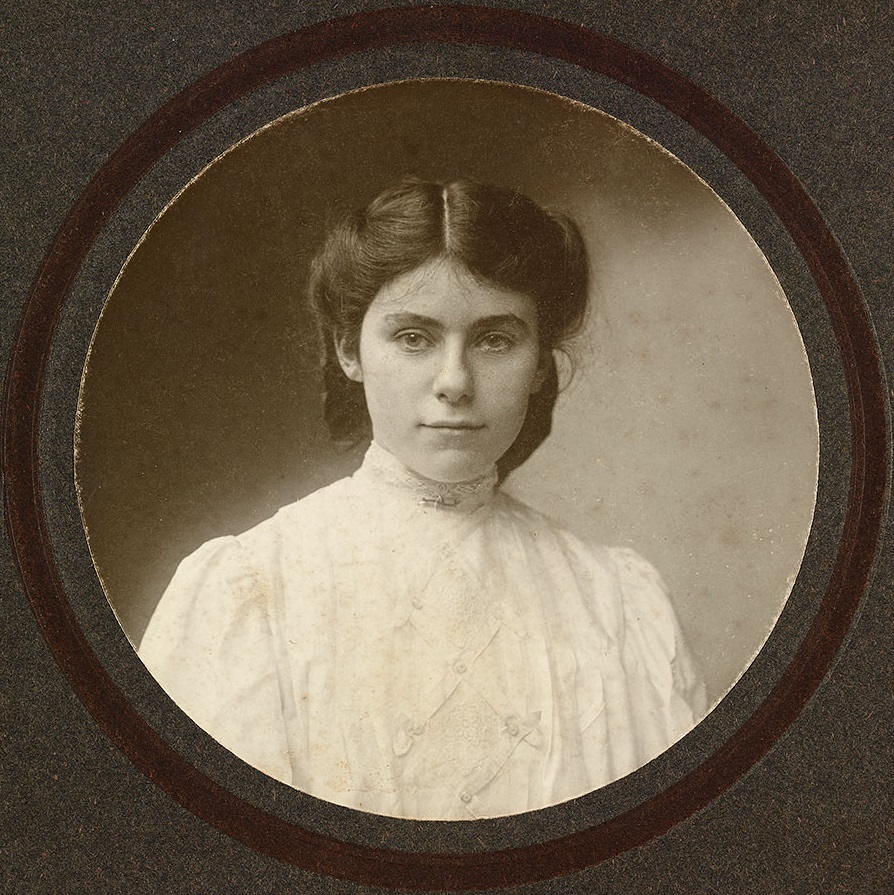
Edith, aged 17, 1906

Edith Mary Tolkien, born Bratt (21 January 1889 – 29 November 1971) was the wife of J. R. R. Tolkien. She served as the inspiration for his fictional character Lúthien Tinúviel, an Elven princess and the most beautiful of all the Children of Ilúvatar (the name of God in Tolkien's fiction).

Bratt first met Tolkien in 1908, when they lived in the same boarding house. Both were orphans. The two fell in love, despite Bratt being Tolkien's senior by three years. Before the end of 1909 the relationship became known to Tolkien's guardian, Father Francis Xavier Morgan, who forbade Tolkien to see Bratt until he was 21. With one exception, Tolkien obeyed this instruction to the letter while Father Morgan's guardianship lasted. They were married in 1916.

The couple are buried side by side in Wolvercote Cemetery, Oxford; below the names on their grave are the names Beren and Lúthien: in Tolkien's legendarium, Lúthien and the Man Beren were lovers separated for a time by Lúthien's father King Thingol.

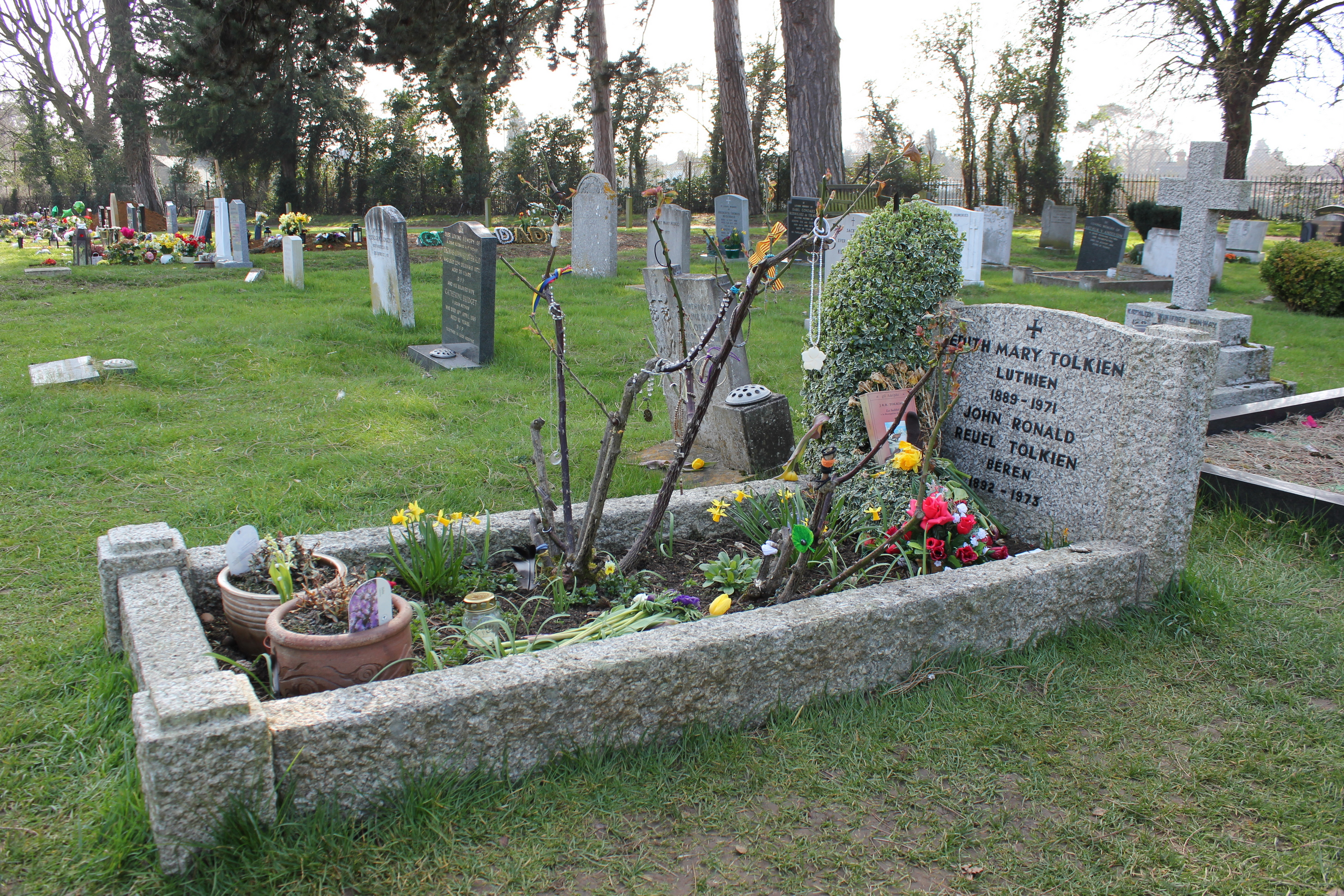
The grave of Edith and J. R. R. Tolkien in the Wolvercote Cemetery, Oxonmoot

=== Hilary Tolkien ===
Hilary Arthur Reuel Tolkien (17 February 1894 – 1976), the younger brother of J. R. R. Tolkien, was born in Bloemfontein, South Africa. The climate did not suit the young J. R. R. Tolkien and his mother took both her sons to visit her parents in Kings Heath in Birmingham. When her husband died in 1896 she decided to stay back in England with her sons. They moved to Sarehole, a village then outside Birmingham, in 1896. As a child, J. R. R. Tolkien used to tell stories to his younger brother Hilary, making ogres out of the adult people in the village. Ronald nicknamed the flour-coated miller's son in the nearby Sarehole Mill The White Ogre. A farmer who used to terrorise children intruding on his land was nicknamed as the Black Ogre. He once chased Ronald for plucking mushrooms from his farm. Hilary wrote the stories, letters and reminiscences of past times in a notebook during his twilight years. The contents of the notebook were published as a book titled Black & White Ogre Country: The Lost Tales of Hilary Tolkien in 2009. In 1902, the family moved to 26 Oliver Road in Edgbaston, Birmingham and later they both joined St. Philip's School in Birmingham. However, they soon left the school and their mother started teaching them at home. In 1904, both brothers contracted measles and whooping cough. Owing to the poor condition of their house on Oliver Road, Hilary also contracted pneumonia.

When their mother became ill with diabetes, Ronald was sent to live with his aunt Jane's fiancé and future husband Edwin Neave. Hilary was sent to stay with his maternal grandparents, the Suffields. After the death of their mother they were raised by Fr Francis Morgan. Hilary later passed an entrance examination and joined King Edward's School in 1905, where his elder brother also studied. Hilary left school in 1910 and later helped his aunt Jane Neave run Phoenix Farm in the village of Gedling in Nottinghamshire. Hilary, his brother, aunt Jane and members of the Brookes-Smith family made a trip to Switzerland in the summer of 1911. In late September 1914, J. R. R. Tolkien stayed with his aunt and brother at the farm for a few days. In 1914 during World War I, Hilary enlisted in the British Army with the Royal Warwickshire Regiment as a bugler and was wounded in 1916. After his military service, Hilary returned to Gedling and, in 1922, bought an orchard and market garden near Evesham, ancestral town of his mother's family. In 1923, J. R. R. Tolkien, along with his wife and children, went to stay with Hilary for a while. A few months before his death, he visited Hilary in Evesham. Hilary married Magdalen Matthews in 1928. They had three sons. The first, Gabriel, was born in 1931, the second, Julian, in 1935, and the third, Paul, in 1938.

=== John Francis Reuel Tolkien ===
John Francis Reuel Tolkien (16 November 1917 – 22 January 2003) was the eldest son of J. R. R. Tolkien. He was born in Cheltenham. He was educated at the Dragon School, Oxford, and The Oratory School in Caversham, Berkshire, where in his final year he decided to become a priest. On the advice of the archbishop he decided to go to university to study English and joined Exeter College, Oxford, from where he received his BA degree in 1939. In November 1939, he went to the English College, Rome, to train as a priest. Due to the outbreak of World War II, the college was moved to Stonyhurst in Lancashire, where John trained as a priest during the war. He was ordained as a priest at St Gregory & St Augustine Church in North Oxford. His first position was as a curate from 1946 to 1950 at the St Mary and St Benedict Church in Coventry, where he taught weekly classes to 60 children and organised the building of church schools. From 1950 to 1957, he was a curate at the English Martyrs Church in Sparkhill, Birmingham. Thereafter he moved to North Staffordshire, where he was the chaplain of University College of North Staffordshire, now Keele University, and at two grammar schools, St Joseph's College, Trent Vale and St Dominic's High School, Hartshill. He was parish priest at Knutton Roman Catholic Church from 1957 to 1966. In 1966, he became the parish priest at Our Lady of the Angels and St Peter in Chains Church, Stoke-on-Trent. He held the position until 1987 and there oversaw the building of a new school. He was chairman of governors at Bishop Bright School, chaplain to the North Staffordshire Catholic Teachers Association and area chaplain to the Young Christian Students. He moved back to Oxford in 1987, settling in Eynsham, where he was the parish priest at St. Peter's Catholic Church until his retirement in 1994. Father Tolkien also served in parishes in Oxford, Birmingham, and Warwickshire.

In 1987, he and his sister Priscilla began identifying the large collection of family photographs. In 1992, they released a book titled The Tolkien Family Album containing photographs and memories of the Tolkien family and giving an account of their father's life to celebrate the centenary birth anniversary of J. R. R. Tolkien.

=== Michael Hilary Reuel Tolkien ===
Michael Hilary Reuel Tolkien, GM (22 October 1920 – 27 February 1984) was a British teacher. He was J. R. R. Tolkien's second son and was named after J. R. R. Tolkien's brother Hilary. When young Michael lost his toy dog and became sad about this, his father began to write the story of Roverandom to comfort him. Michael's fear of spiders was J. R. R. Tolkien's inspiration for the encounter of Bilbo Baggins and the spiders of Mirkwood in The Hobbit. Michael also used to own a Dutch doll which became an inspiration for Tom Bombadil. In 1939, with the outbreak of the Second World War, Michael volunteered for the British Army but he was told to continue his university studies. He studied history at Trinity College, Oxford. In 1941, Michael Hilary Tolkien served in an anti-aircraft role during the Battle of Britain for which he was awarded the George Medal (GM). He met a nurse named Joan Audrey Griffith (1916–1982) whom he married the same year. On 2 August 1941, he was commissioned as a second lieutenant in the Devonshire Regiment, British Army. He served as an anti-aircraft gunner in France and Germany. He relinquished his commission on 31 December 1942 "on account of ill health", and was allowed to retain the rank of lieutenant. In 1944, he returned to Trinity College and finished his studies. He graduated in Modern History in 1945.

From 1947 until the 1970s, he worked as a teacher at various Catholic schools in Britain. In 1973, Michael Tolkien published an article about his father in The Sunday Telegraph: "J. R. R. Tolkien – The Wizard Father". Michael and his wife Joan had three children: Michael George Reuel (b. 1943), Joan Anne (b. 1945) and Judith (b. 1951). Royd Tolkien is the son of Michael's daughter Joan. Michael Hilary Reuel Tolkien died in 1984 from leukaemia.

=== Christopher Tolkien ===
Christopher John Reuel Tolkien (21 November 1924 – 16 January 2020) was the youngest son of J. R. R. and Edith Tolkien. He was his father's literary executor and the editor of much of his father's posthumously published work. During the Second World War he served in the RAF as a pilot. After the war, he followed in his father's footsteps, becoming a lecturer and tutor in English Language at New College, Oxford, from 1964 to 1975. Christopher Tolkien married twice. He last lived in France with his second wife, Baillie Tolkien.

In 2001, he received some attention for his stance on New Line Cinema's The Lord of the Rings film trilogy, directed by Peter Jackson. It was reported that he had had a falling out with his son Simon over the appropriateness of a film adaptation. Responding to these reports, he said he felt The Lord of the Rings was "peculiarly unsuitable for transformation into visual dramatic form". He said he did not disapprove of the movies, definitely not "to the point of thinking ill" of those with whom he might disagree.

=== Faith Faulconbridge ===
Faith Lucy Tilly Faulconbridge (1928 – 24 October 2017) was the first wife of Christopher Tolkien, whom she married on 2 April 1951. Their son Simon was born in 1959. She produced a bust of J. R. R. Tolkien that is displayed in the English Faculty Library at Oxford University. She was born to F. T. Faulconbridge, whom J. R. R. Tolkien knew as a fellow student from King Edward's School, Birmingham. She received her B.A. degree from St Anne's College, Oxford, in 1950 and later studied sculpture-making from Oxford Art School. She was initially known for portrait heads in bronze, some of which she presented in the Royal Academy in 1958. She made a bust of her father-in-law which the English faculty at Oxford presented to him on his retirement in 1959. He had it cast in bronze and in 1966 it was placed at the English Faculty Library. Her other subjects included Iris Murdoch and C. S. Lewis. She separated from Christopher in 1964 and divorced from him in 1967. In 1958, she produced a seated Madonna and Child for the Catholic Chaplaincy at Birmingham University. In the early 1980s she returned to religious themes, including working for the Corpus Christi Church in Headington, Oxford and the Church of the Sacred Heart in Sutton Coldfield. She died on 24 October 2017.

=== Baillie Tolkien ===
Baillie Tolkien (née Klass; born 10 December 1941) was the second wife of Christopher Tolkien. She was born in Winnipeg to Dr Alan Klass and his wife Helen. Alan Klass (1907–2000) was a surgeon and a distinguished member of the Faculty of Medicine at the University of Manitoba. Baillie attended McGill University and the University of Manitoba from which Baillie received her B.A. in 1962. She received her M.A. from St Hilda's College, Oxford, in 1964. Her first husband was Brian Knapheis, a Rhodes Scholar from Winnipeg, to whom she was briefly married. Under the name Baillie Knapheis, she worked as a secretary, first to J. R. R. Tolkien and then to Isaiah Berlin. She married Christopher Tolkien on 18 September 1967. She has two children with Christopher. Their son Adam Reuel Tolkien was born in 1969, and their daughter Rachel Clare Reuel Tolkien was born in 1971. After the death of J. R. R. Tolkien, his letters written to his children were edited by Baillie for publication. The contents of the book were released in a 1976 book titled The Father Christmas Letters, in which Baillie is credited as the editor. In the 1976–77 exhibition of paintings held at the Ashmolean Museum in Oxford and afterwards at the National Book League in London, Baillie contributed a short introduction to the catalogue.

=== Priscilla Tolkien ===
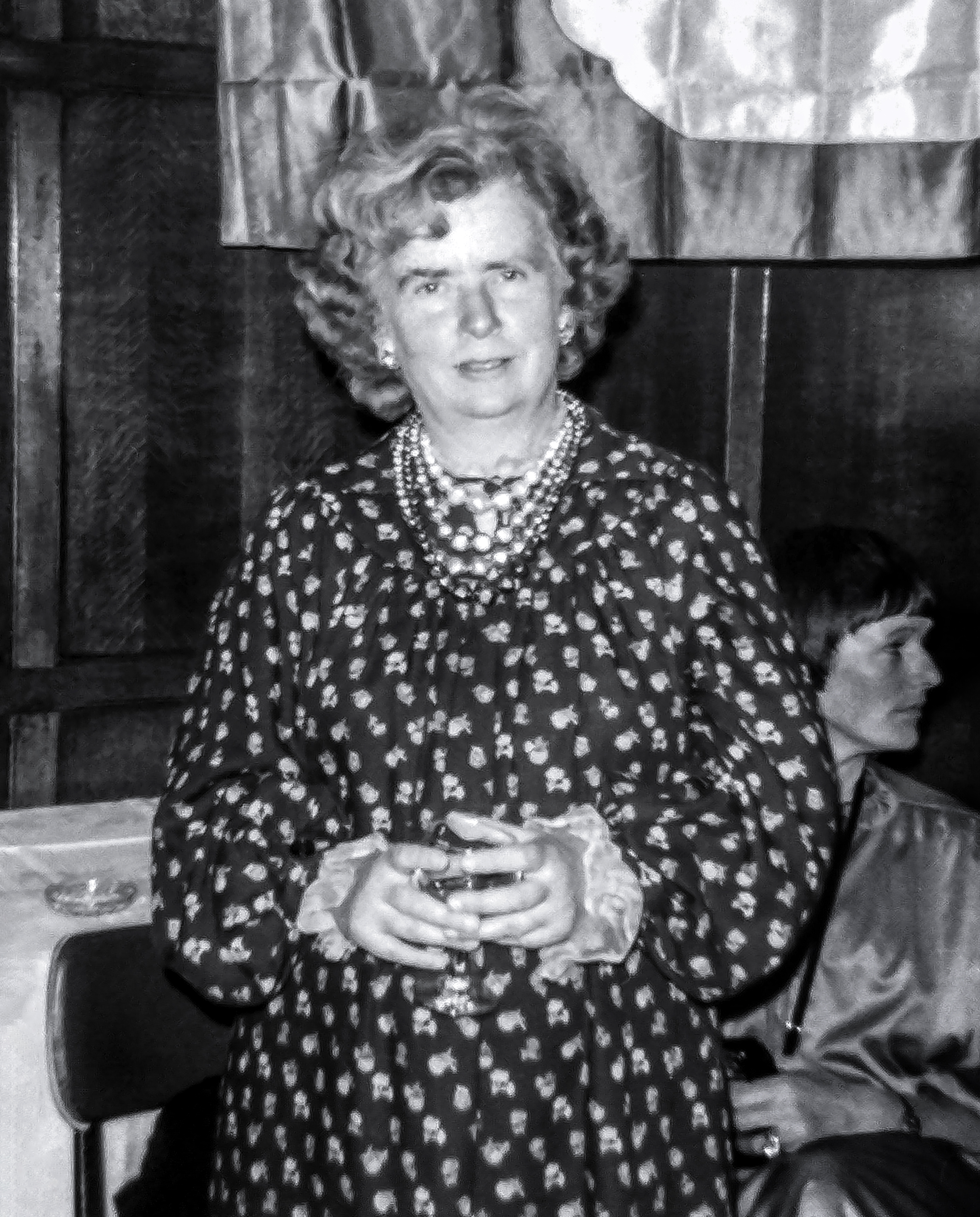
Priscilla Tolkien in 1979

Priscilla Mary Anne Reuel Tolkien (18 June 1929 – 28 February 2022) was the fourth and youngest child of J. R. R. Tolkien, his only daughter. Priscilla had long been hoped for, and was born to Tolkien and his wife in their house at 22 Northmoor Road in Oxford shortly before the couple moved into their new one at 20 Northmoor Road in 1930. She took an active part in production of The Lord of the Rings by typing out some early chapters for her father at the age of fourteen. She completed her B.A. degree in English at Lady Margaret Hall, Oxford in 1951. The initial name of Frodo Baggins in the fourth draft of The Lord of the Rings was Bingo Bolger-Baggins which was named after a family of toy bears owned by Priscilla. She accompanied her father to a two-week holiday in Italy from late July to mid-August 1955. After that, she started living in the further side of the Oxford city from her parents' house but still saw them frequently and started working as a probation officer in the city. She was also a social worker. Tolkien wrote his last letter to Priscilla in August 1973. She was, until her death, the honorary vice-president of the Tolkien Society. She wrote an article titled "My Father the Artist" in December 1976 for Amon Hen, the bulletin of the Tolkien Society. After her eldest brother John returned to Oxford in 1987, the siblings began identifying and cataloging the large collection of family photographs. In 1992, she and John published the book The Tolkien Family Album containing pictures of the Tolkien family to celebrate the 100th birth anniversary of their father. The same year she unveiled a plaque at the Anglican Cathedral of St. Andrew and St. Michael commemorating the centenary birth anniversary celebrations of her father at his birthplace of Bloemfontein, South Africa. She launched the special Tolkien edition Royal Mail stamps commemorating her father's works in February 2004. In 2012, she along with a coalition of British publishers sued Warner Brothers in her capacity of a trustee of The Tolkien Trust for US$80 million accusing them of exploiting Middle-earth characters to promote online gambling.

=== Michael George R. Tolkien ===
Michael George Reuel Tolkien (born 1943) is a British poet. He is the grandson of J. R. R. Tolkien, being the eldest son of Michael H. R. Tolkien. Michael Tolkien was educated at The Oratory School in Oxford and then Ampleforth College. He studied English and Classics at St Andrews University and later a B.Phil. at Oxford. He taught as Head of English at Uppingham School until 1992. He has several volumes of published poetry including "Taking Cover", "Outstripping Gravity" and "Reaching for a Stranger". He is published by Redbeck Press. Michael Tolkien has two daughters, Catherine, born in 1969 and Ruth, born in 1982. He is married to the artist Rosemary Walters. He sits on the board of the Tolkien Estate.

=== Simon Tolkien ===
Simon Mario Reuel Tolkien (born 1959) is a British barrister and novelist. He is the grandson of J. R. R. Tolkien. He is the only son of Christopher Tolkien and his first wife, Faith Faulconbridge. Simon Tolkien was educated at the Dragon School in Oxford and then Downside School. He studied modern history at Trinity College, Oxford. In 1984, he married Tracey Steinberg who was born in 1962. They have two children, a son, Nicholas, and a daughter, Anna. Tracey Tolkien owned and operated a vintage clothing store in Chelsea, London, Steinberg & Tolkien which shut in September 2007. She has also published several books on vintage clothing and jewellery. Simon became a barrister in 1994, specializing in criminal defence and prosecution. Their son Nicholas is a playwright and director who debuted with his first play Terezin, in June 2017.

In January 2000, he began writing fiction. His first novel, which he has described as a black comedy, was not accepted for publication. His second novel, a courtroom drama, was published in the United States as The Final Witness in 2002 and in United Kingdom as The Stepmother in 2003. His second published work, The Inheritance (the first of a trilogy featuring Inspector Trave of the Oxfordshire Criminal Investigation Department), was published in 2010. The second book of the Inspector Trave trilogy titled The King of Diamonds was released in 2011. The third and final book in the trilogy titled Orders from Berlin was released in 2012. In 2016, he authored a novel titled No Man's Land inspired by J. R. R. Tolkien's experiences in the Battle of the Somme.

Simon Tolkien notably disagreed with the policy of his grandfather's estate in regard to The Lord of the Rings films. When Christopher Tolkien issued a statement that the "Tolkien estate would be best advised to avoid any specific association with the films", Simon Tolkien broke ranks, offering to cooperate with the filmmakers, stating "It was my view that we take a much more positive line on the film and that was overruled by my father." Following up a 2001 interview with the Independent, Simon in 2003 gave interviews to the Daily Telegraph and other media in which he discussed his strained relationship with his father, describing it as a permanent breach. However, they later reconciled.

=== Royd Tolkien ===
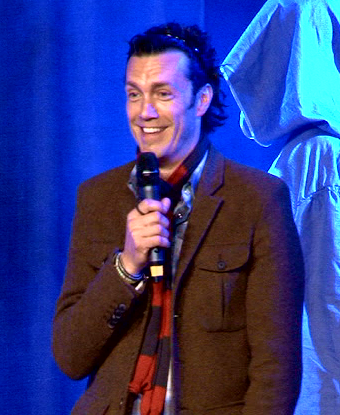
Royd Tolkien on 20 April 2014 at the Hobbitcon II convention in Bonn, Germany

Royd Allan Reuel Tolkien is a great-grandson of J. R. R. Tolkien. He was born on 16 July 1969 to Joan Tolkien, Michael's daughter, and Hugh Baker. At the request of Peter Jackson, he portrayed a soldier of Gondor passing arms out to other soldiers as they prepare to defend Osgiliath in The Return of the King, the final film in Jackson's film adaptation of his great-grandfather's works. Royd Tolkien also produced a film titled Pimp, wherein he also plays himself. He established a film production company called R&R Films along with Robert Cavanah in 2010. (Note: Known as R & R Film in 2016, but after 2017 no website.) He co-produced a mockumentary video film titled Tontine or possibly Tontine Massacre.

Royd has an older sister, Mandy Doyle, who was born in 1967. He also had a brother, Michael "Mike" Baker, who was born in 1975 and had motor neurone disease. Mike died in 2015. In 2012, Royd, Mike and Peter Jackson made an appearance in an Air New Zealand safety video that was part of a major global promotion linked to the movie The Hobbit: An Unexpected Journey. Royd also made a cameo appearance in the extended edition of the film The Hobbit: The Desolation of Smaug. He appears during a scene in which Beorn and Gandalf are discussing the catacombs where the Nazgûl were buried.

=== Ruth Tolkien ===
Ruth Mary Reuel Tolkien is a great-granddaughter of J. R. R. Tolkien. She is the daughter of Michael George Reuel Tolkien. Ruth Tolkien is registered blind and is believed to be the only blind fencer competing against sighted opponents in British Fencing events. As of September 2015, she is ranked 186 in the UK by British Fencing. In October 2015 she was interviewed by Matthew Bannister on the BBC World Service about her fencing success.

=== Tim Tolkien ===
Timothy Tolkien (born October 1962) is the great-nephew of J. R. R. Tolkien and the grandson of Hilary Tolkien. His father is Julian Tolkien. He is a sculptor who has designed several monumental sculptures, including the award-winning Sentinel. He has a public art and metal sculpture business at Cradley Heath, West Midlands. He is also a bass player and member of the band Klangstorm, founded in 1996.

== Tolkien family tree ==
=== Ancestral line of the Tolkien family ===
- Michel Tolkien (born c. 1620), of Kreuzburg, East Prussia
  - Christianus Tolkien (1663–1746), miller in Kreuzburg
    - Christian Tolkien (1706–1791), of Kreuzburg and Danzig
      - Daniel Gottlieb Tolkien (1747–1813), of Danzig and London
      - Johann (John) Benjamin Tolkien (1752–1819), of Danzig and London
        - George William Tolkien (1784–1840), of London
          - John Benjamin Tolkien (1807–1896), of Birmingham
            - Arthur Reuel Tolkien (1857–1896), of Birmingham and Bloemfontein, South Africa
              - J. R. R. Tolkien (1892–1973)

=== J. R. R. Tolkien's descendants ===
Tolkien family tree

John Suffield Jr. 1833–1930	Emily Jane Sparrow	John Benjamin Tolkien; 1807–1896	Mary Jane Stowe
Walter Incledon	Edith May Suffield; 1865–1936	Mabel Suffield; 1870–1904	Arthur Reuel Tolkien; 1857–1896	Grace Bindley Tolkien; 1861–1947	William Charles Mountain	Marian Esther Tolkien; 1866–1934	Frederick William Chippendale	Wilfred Tolkien; 1870–1938	Katherine Madeleine Green
Edwin Neave; 1872–1909	Jane Suffield; 1872–1963	William Suffield; 1874–1904	Beatrice Bartlett	Thomas "Tom" Evans Mitton	Mabel Tolkien; 1858–1937	Tom Hadley	Florence Mary Tolkien b. 1863	"Emily" Grace McGregor	Laurence George H. Tolkien b. 1873
Marjorie May Incledon; 1891–1973	Frieda Mary Incledon; 1895–1940	Edith Bratt; 1889–1971	John Ronald Reuel Tolkien; 1892–1973	Hilary Arthur Reuel Tolkien; 1894–1976	Magdalen Matthews; 1905–1970
John Francis Reuel Tolkien; 1917–2003	Priscilla Anne Reuel Tolkien; 1929–2022	Lilian June Icke; 1928–1999	Gabriel Francis Hilary Tolkien; 1931–2007	Paul Tolkien b. 1938	Annie McConnell
Joan Griffiths; 1916–1982	Michael Hilary Reuel Tolkien; 1920–1984	Faith Faulconbridge; 1928–2017	Christopher John Reuel Tolkien; 1924–2020	Baillie Klass b. 1941	Julian Joseph Hyacinth Tolkien; 1935–2025	Glynis Lilian Read; 1933–2022
Irene Ferrier	Michael George Tolkien b. 1943	Rosemary Walters	Simon Tolkien b. 1959	Tracy Sternberg	Christopher Tolkien	Angela Tolkien	Dominic Tolkien	Zoë Tolkien
Joanna Tolkien b. 1945	Hugh Baker	Judith Tolkien b. 1951	Alan Crombleholme	Adam Reuel Tolkien b. 1969	Rachel Clare Reuel Tolkien b. 1971	Sue	Timothy Tolkien b. 1962	Nicholas Tolkien b. 1964	Stephen Tolkien b. 1966
Mandy Doyle b. 1967	Michael "Mike" Baker; 1975–2015	Freya Crombleholme b. 1976	Piers Crombleholme b. 1979
Royd; Tolkien b. 1969	Catherine Tolkien b. 1969	Ruth Tolkien b. 1982	Nicholas Tolkien b. 1990	Anna Tolkien b. 2005

== Works cited ==
- Atherton, Mark (2014). There and Back Again: J R R Tolkien and the origins of The Hobbit. I.B. Tauris. ISBN 978-1-78076-927-1.
- Carpenter, Humphrey (1977). J. R. R. Tolkien: A Biography. New York: Ballantine Books. ISBN 978-0-04-928037-3.
- Carpenter, Humphrey (2014). J. R. R. Tolkien: A Biography. Houghton Mifflin Harcourt. ISBN 978-0-54752-442-9.
- Drout, Michael D. C., ed. (2006). J. R. R. Tolkien Encyclopedia. Routledge. ISBN 978-1-13588-034-7.
- Duriez, Colin (2003). Tolkien and C. S. Lewis. Paulist Press. ISBN 978-1-58768-026-7.
- Lee, Stuart D. (2014). A Companion to J. R. R. Tolkien. John Wiley & Sons. ISBN 978-1-11851-748-2.
