= Tolkin =

Tolkin may refer to:

- Mel Tolkin, né Shmuel Tolchinsky (1913 - 2007), a Ukrainian-Canadian television comedy writer
- Michael Tolkin (born 1950), an American filmmaker and novelist; son of Mel Tolkin
- Mike Tolkin (born 1967), American rugby coach
- Neil Tolkin, a Canadian-American screen writer
- Peter Tolkin Architecture (formerly Tolkin & Associates Architecture), an architectural firm based in Pasadena, California
- Terry Tolkin, the Vice President of A&R at Elektra Records

== See also ==
- Tolkien (disambiguation) (Low German surname)
- Toelken
