= Lúthien and Beren =

Fictional couple in Tolkien's Middle-earth

Lúthien
- Tolkien character

In-universe information
- Full name: Lúthien Tinúviel
- Alias: Tinúviel
- Race: Maia / Elf
- Gender: Female
- Relatives: Thingol (father); Melian (mother); Dior Eluchíl (son)
- Book(s): The Silmarillion; Beren and Lúthien

Beren
- Tolkien character

In-universe information
- Alias: Erchamion
- Race: Men (Edain)
- Gender: Male
- Weapon: Angrist; Spear
- Relatives: Barahir (father); Emeldir (mother); Dior Eluchíl (son)
- Book(s): The Silmarillion; Beren and Lúthien

Lúthien and Beren are characters in J. R. R. Tolkien's fantasy world Middle-earth. Lúthien is an elf, daughter of the elf-king Thingol and goddess-like Melian. Beren is a mortal man. The complex tale of their love for each other and the quest they are forced to embark upon is a story of triumph against overwhelming odds but ending in tragedy. It appears in The Silmarillion, the epic poem The Lay of Leithian, the Grey Annals section of The War of the Jewels, and in the texts collected in the 2017 book Beren and Lúthien. Their story is told to Frodo by Aragorn in The Lord of the Rings.

The story of Lúthien and Beren, immortal elf-maiden marrying a mortal man and choosing mortality for herself, is mirrored in Tolkien's The Tale of Aragorn and Arwen. The names Beren and Lúthien appear on the grave of Tolkien and his wife Edith.

Scholars have noted the many sources that Tolkien used in constructing the story. It is based principally on the classical tale of Orpheus and Eurydice in the underworld, supplemented by multiple story elements from myths, legends, and folktales from different periods. These include the Finnish Kalevala, the Welsh Mabinogion, the Saga of the Volsungs, the Prose Edda, and the folktale "Rapunzel".

== Context ==
Lúthien was a Telerin (Sindarin) princess, the only child of Elu Thingol, king of Doriath, and his queen, Melian the Maia, making her half-royal, half-divine. She was born in the Years of the Trees, according to the Grey Annals. At her birth, the white flower niphredil bloomed for the first time in Doriath. Lúthien's romance with the mortal man Beren is considered the "chief" of the Silmarillion tales by Tolkien himself; he called it "the kernel of the mythology". (Note: Carpenter 2023, #165 to the Houghton Mifflin Co., 30 June 1955) Elrond was Lúthien's great-grandson and Aragorn was descended from her via Elros and the Royal Family of Númenor. She is described as the Morning Star of the Elves and as the most beautiful daughter of the one god, Ilúvatar. Beren was the son of Emeldir and Barahir, a man of the royal House of Bëor of Dorthonion. (Note: Tolkien 1977, ch. 19 "Of Beren and Lúthien")

In contrast, Lúthien's descendant Arwen was called Evenstar, the Evening Star of the Elves, meaning that her beauty reflects that of Lúthien. Lúthien was first cousin once removed of Galadriel (also Arwen's grandmother), whose mother, Eärwen of Alqualondë, was the daughter of Thingol's brother. The story of Lúthien and Beren is mirrored in The Tale of Aragorn and Arwen. (Note: Tolkien 1955, Appendix A: The Tale of Aragorn and Arwen)

== Etymology ==
The name Lúthien appears to mean "daughter of flowers" in a Beleriandic dialect of Sindarin, but it can also be translated "blossom". The epithet Tinúviel was given to her by Beren. It literally means "daughter of the starry twilight", which signifies "nightingale". The name Beren means "brave" in Sindarin. (Note: Tolkien 1987, ch. 3 The Lost Road)

== Fictional biography ==
=== Meeting ===
Lúthien — a gouache painting depicting a scene from The Silmarillion by Ted Nasmith. It was published in the 1990 Tolkien Calendar.

Beren saw Lúthien dancing under moonrise in her father's forest, and fell in love with her, captivated by her beauty. He stood in the shadows wishing to be near enough to Lúthien to touch her, but Daeron, her childhood friend and partner in music and dance, noticed Beren and, believing him to be a wild animal, shouted for Lúthien to flee. She saw Beren's shadow and ran away. One day in summer when Lúthien was dancing on a green hill surrounded by hemlocks, she sang, awakening Beren. He ran to her, and again she tried to escape and he cried Tinúviel. When Lúthien gazed upon him she reciprocated his love. He kissed her, but she slipped away and he fell into a deep sleep. In his hour of despair, she appeared before him, and in the Hidden Kingdom of Doriath set her hand in his and cradled his head against her breast. From then on they met secretly.

=== The quest of the Silmaril ===
Daeron, who also loved her, reported her meetings with Beren to her father. Though Melian warned her husband against it, Thingol was determined not to let Beren marry his daughter, and set a seemingly impossible task as the bride price: Beren had to bring him one of the Silmarils from Morgoth's Iron Crown.

=== Vision and imprisonment ===
Lúthien had a vision of Beren lying suffering in the pits of Sauron, Lord of Werewolves. Her mother told her that Beren was captive in Sauron's dungeons. Lúthien decided to save Beren, asking Daeron for help, but he betrayed her to Thingol. Thingol then had her guarded in the high branches of a beech tree. Daeron was filled with remorse; Lúthien forgave him and devised a plan to escape. She enchanted her hair into a cloak to lull her guards to sleep, and ran from her prison.

On her way to rescue Beren, she found Huan, the Hound of Valinor, and was taken to his master Celegorm. He, plotting to force her to marry him, offered to help her, asking her to follow him to Nargothrond. When she arrived, Celegorm held her hostage and forbade her to talk to anyone else. Huan took pity on her, betraying his master, and freed her. Huan was granted the power to speak, and together they escaped from Nargothrond.

They came to Sauron's Isle, and Lúthien sang a call to Beren. He answered, but Sauron heard her song and sent wolves to slay Huan, but Huan killed them, one by one. Finally, Sauron transformed himself into the most powerful of all werewolves and went out. Huan flinched, but Lúthien smothered Sauron's lunge in her enchanted cloak. Sauron changed into different shapes, but Huan bested him. Lúthien forced Sauron to surrender the keys of his tower; he fled in the shape of a vampire. Lúthien destroyed the Tower. Finding Beren seemingly dead, she fell down beside him in grief, but with the rising sun he awoke and they were reunited. Huan returned to Celegorm.

=== Celegorm, Curufin and the dance of Lúthien before Morgoth ===
Beren pleaded with Lúthien to return to her father, but she refused. As they were about to embrace, Celegorm and Curufin appeared, exiled because of Lúthien's escape from Nargothrond. Seeking revenge, they fought Beren, and Huan again fought on Lúthien's side. Beren defeated them, but spared their lives at Lúthien's request. Beren stole one of their horses, and the couple fled. As she slept, he went to Angband to get the Silmaril.

Lúthien and Huan disguised themselves as Mairon's vampire Thuringwethil and the werewolf Draugluin. She found Beren and they reached the throne of Morgoth, but he saw through Lúthien's disguise. She declared herself and offered to sing for Morgoth. Filled with an evil lust, he accepted, but she put him and his entire court into a deep sleep. She awakened Beren, and he cut a Silmaril from Morgoth's crown. As he tried for another Silmaril, his blade snapped, striking Morgoth's cheek. Lúthien and Beren fled to the gates, where the werewolf Carcharoth attacked them. Beren thrust the Silmaril into its face, but it bit off Beren's hand, swallowing it and the Silmaril. Lúthien sucked out the venom, and with her failing power tried to restore Beren. Huan summoned the Eagles of Manwë, who carried them to Doriath.

=== Return to Doriath and death of Beren ===
Lúthien healed Beren, and together they stood before her father's throne. Beren told Thingol that the quest was fulfilled, and that he held a Silmaril in his hand. When Thingol demanded to see it, Beren showed him his stump. The couple then explained what had happened. They were married before Thingol's throne that day. Meanwhile, Carcharoth slaughtered all the living beings he came across in his frenzied flight, both empowered and tormented by the jewel burning his stomach. Beren, Thingol, Huan, and other Elves went to defeat the beast. Beren was attacked by the wolf; Huan killed the beast, but died of his wounds. Beren was carried to Doriath, where he died in Lúthien's arms.

=== Lúthien becomes mortal for Beren ===
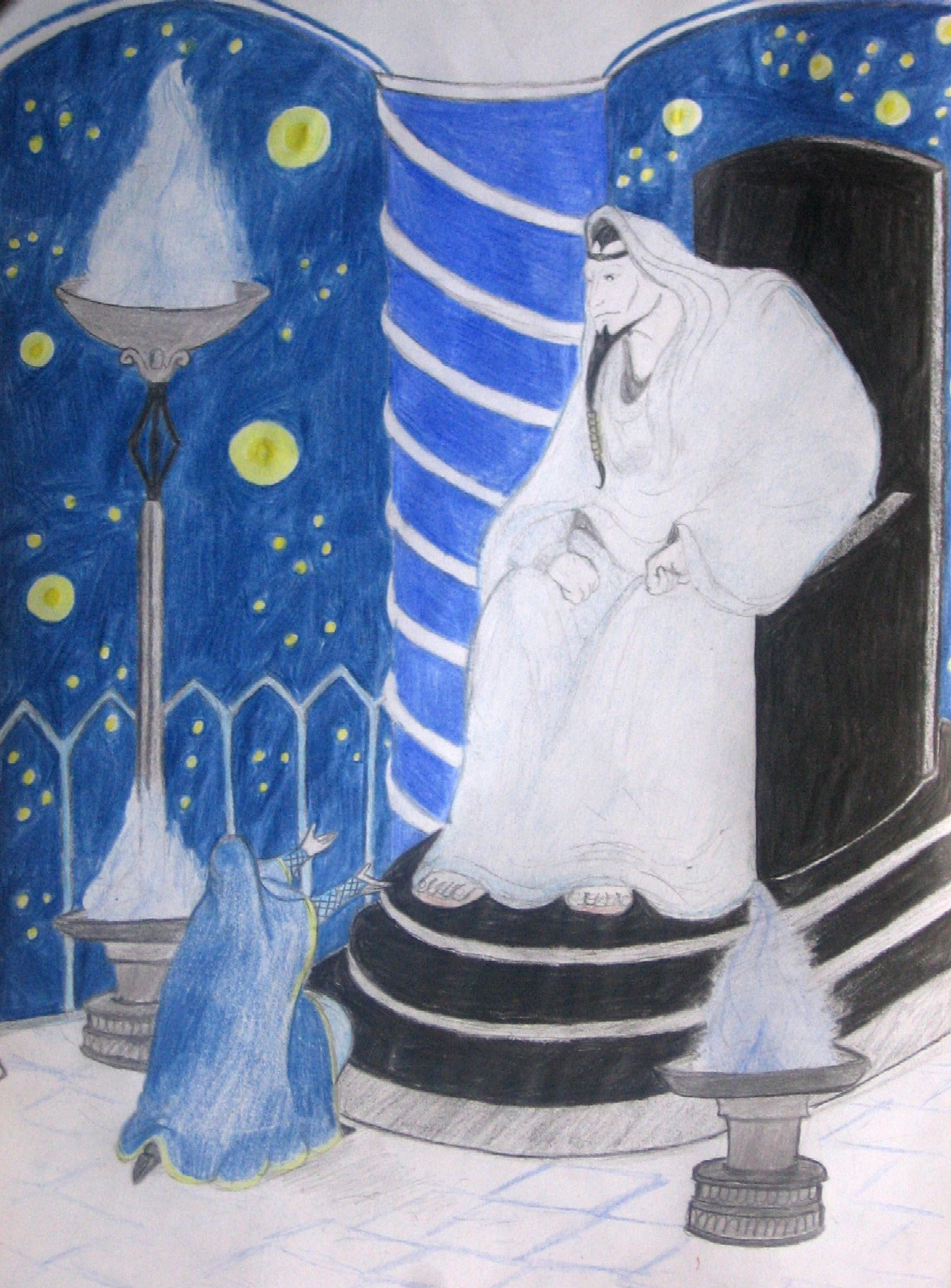
Lúthien pleading with Mandos. Art by Gregor Roffalski

In grief, Lúthien lay down and died, going to the Halls of Mandos. (Note: There the spirits of dead Elves await re-embodiment in Valinor; the spirits of dead Men await their departure from the circles of the world. (Note: Tolkien 1977 ch. 7 "Of the Silmarils and the Unrest of the Noldor")) There she sang a song of the suffering of Elves and Men, the greatest ever sung. This proved effective: it was the only time that Mandos ever acted out of pity. He summoned Beren from the houses of the dead, and Lúthien's spirit met his by the shores of the sea. Mandos consulted with Manwë, King of Arda. Even Manwë could not change the fate of Men, and so he gave Lúthien a choice: to live in Valinor, but without Beren; or to return to Middle-earth with Beren as a mortal herself, accepting the Doom of Men. She chose Beren and mortality.

=== Return to life, and death ===
Lúthien and Beren dwelt together in Ossiriand until after the sack of Menegroth. Their abode was Dor Firn-i-Guinar: the "Land of the Dead that Lived". They had a son, Dior. (Note: Tolkien 1977, ch. 20 "Of the Fifth Battle: Nirnaeth Arnoediad")

Thingol received the Nauglamír from Húrin, who had recovered it from the ruins of Nargothrond. Thingol decided to unite the greatest works of the Dwarves and the Elves – the Nauglamír and the Silmaril – and hired Dwarf smiths from Nogrod. The Dwarves murdered Thingol and took the Nauglamír. Beren and an army of Green Elves and Ents waylaid the returning Dwarves. Beren reclaimed the Nauglamír, and Lúthien kept the necklace and the great jewel all her life. This hastened Beren's and Lúthien's end, since her beauty enhanced by the jewel was too bright for mortal lands to bear. (Note: Tolkien 1977, ch. 22 "Of the Ruin of Doriath")

Elrond and Arwen were descendants of Lúthien, as was Aragorn, a descendant of Elrond's brother Elros.

== Genealogy ==
Half-elven family tree (Note: Tolkien 1977, "Of the Rings of Power and the Third Age": Family Trees I and II: "The house of Finwë and the Noldorin descent of Elrond and Elros", and "The descendants of Olwë and Elwë") (Note: Tolkien 1955, Appendix A: Annals of the Kings and Rulers, I The Númenórean Kings)

Melian the Maia | Thingol of the Teleri | House of Bëor | House of Haleth | House of Hador | Finwë of the Noldor | Indis of the Vanyar | Olwë of the Teleri
Barahir | Belegund | Hareth | Galdor | Fingolfin | Finarfin | Eärwen
Lúthien | Beren | Rían | Huor | Húrin | Turgon | Elenwë
Dior | Nimloth | Tuor | Idril
Eluréd | Elurín | Elwing | Eärendil | Celeborn | Galadriel
Elros | Elrond | Celebrían
22 Kings of Númenor and Lords of Andúnië
Elendil
Isildur | Anárion
22 Kings of Arnor and Arthedain | 27 Kings of Gondor
Arvedui | Fíriel
15 Dúnedain; Chieftains
Aragorn | Arwen | Elladan | Elrohir
Eldarion | daughters

Colour key:
| Colour | Description |
|---|---|
| | Elves |
| | Men |
| | Maiar |
| | Half-elven |
| | Half-elven who chose the fate of Elves |
| | Half-elven who chose the fate of mortal Men |

== Earlier versions ==
In the various versions of The Tale of Tinúviel, Tolkien's earliest form of the tale, as published in The Book of Lost Tales, her original name is Tinúviel. Beren is, in this earlier version, an Elf (specifically a Noldo, or Gnome), and Sauron has not yet emerged. In his place, they face Tevildo, the Prince of Cats, a monstrous cat who is the principal enemy of the Valinorean hound Huan. However, Tolkien initially created the character of Beren as a mortal man before this in an even earlier but erased version of the tale. (Note: Tolkien 1984, book 2, ch. 1 "The Tale of Tinúviel")

The story is also told in an epic poem in The Lays of Beleriand, upon which most of the finer details of her life and relationship to Beren are extracted from in this article, since The Silmarillion provides only a generalization of the tale. (Note: Tolkien 1985, part 3, ch. 1 "The Gest of Beren son of Barahir and Lúthien the Fay called Tinúviel the Nightingale or the Lay of Leithian – Release from Bondage")

== Analysis ==
The philologist and Tolkien scholar Tom Shippey writes that Tolkien based the tale of Beren and Lúthien on the classical legend of Orpheus in the underworld, and embroiders this framework with story elements from multiple folktales, myths, and legends. These include the Finnish Kalevala, the Welsh Mabinogion, the Norse Saga of the Volsungs, the Icelandic Prose Edda, the Old English Genesis B, and the German folktale "Rapunzel". Shippey comments that Tolkien "had not yet freed himself from his sources – as if trying to bring in all the older bits of literature that he liked instead of forging a story with an impetus of its own."

Tom Shippey on some of the many sources for Tolkien's tale of Beren and Lúthien: principally the tale of Orpheus and Eurydice, but with the addition of story elements from myths, legends, and folktales from different periods.

=== Classical myth ===
Peter Astrup Sundt draws multiple parallels between Beren and Orpheus. More precisely, he compares both Beren and Lúthien and the classical character, as it is Lúthien not Beren who has magical powers, and far from playing a passive Eurydice to be rescued, or not, from the underworld, she too goes to sing for Mandos, the Vala who watches over the souls of the dead. Ben Eldon Stevens adds that Tolkien's retelling contrasts sharply with the myth. Where Orpheus nearly manages to retrieve Eurydice from Hades, Lúthien rescues Beren three times – from Sauron's fortress-prison of Tol-in-Gaurhoth, involving singing; from Morgoth's Angband, with the Silmaril; and by getting Mandos to restore both of them to life. In the original myth, Eurydice meets "a second death", soon followed by the griefstruck Orpheus, whereas Tolkien has Lúthien and Beren enjoy "a second life" after their "resurrection". (Note: Carpenter 2023, #153, September 1954 to Peter Hastings)

Peter Astrup Sundt's parallels between Beren/Lúthien and Orpheus
| Action/theme | Beren | Orpheus | Lúthien |
|---|---|---|---|
| Bond with nature | Yes | Yes | Yes |
| Desperate search for lover | Yes (Lay of Leithian) | Yes | |
| Repeated calling of her name | Tinuviel! Tinuviel! | Eurydicen ... Eurydicen (Virgil's Georgics) | |
| Katabasis, descent into underworld | "Go[es] down" into Doriath, the "perilous, terrible, forbidden" city | Yes | |
| Magical, musical mother | | The muse Calliope | The Maia Melian |
| Powerful song | | Yes | Yes |
| Magical powers | | Yes | Yes |
| Pleads for return of lover | | To Pluto and Proserpine | To Mandos |

=== Harrowing of Hell ===
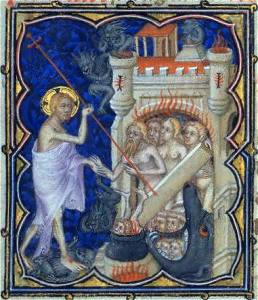
The Harrowing of Hell, Petites Heures, 14th-century illuminated manuscript for John, Duke of Berry

Robert Steed, in Mallorn, argues that Tolkien echoes and "creatively adapts" the medieval theme of the Harrowing of Hell, in the tale of Lúthien and Beren, and in other places. The medieval tale holds that Christ spent the time between his crucifixion and resurrection down in Hell, setting the Devil's captives free with the irresistible power of his divine light. The motif, Steed suggests, involves a multi-step sequence:

1. someone imprisoned in darkness;
2. a powerful and evil jailor;
3. a still more powerful liberator
4. who brings light, and
5. sets the captives free.

Steed describes the tale "Of Beren and Lúthien" as an instance, where Lúthien sets Beren free from Sauron's imprisonment. Beren is freed from darkness, Lúthien from despair, so, Steed remarks, both of them take on aspects of Christ:

But Beren coming back to light out of the pit of despair lifted her up, and they looked again upon one another; and the day rising over dark hills shone upon them." (Note: Tolkien 1977, 19 "Of Beren and Lúthien")

=== Folktale, fairytale ===
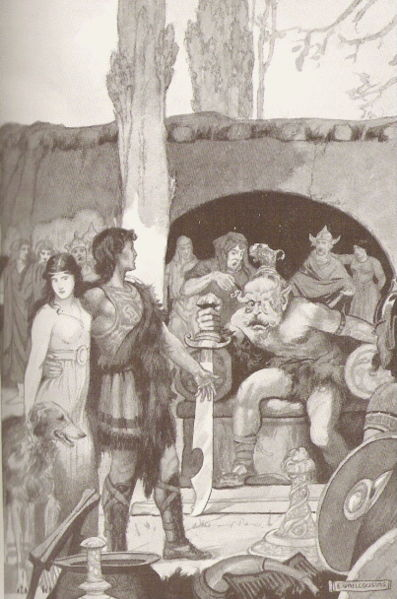
Possible influence from the Welsh "Culhwch and Olwen": heroic hound, woman with magical powers, warrior seeking her hand in marriage, demanding father. Illustration "Culhwch at Ysbaddaden's court" by Ernest Wallcousins, 1920

Several scholars, from Randel Helms onwards, have noted that Tolkien's tale of Beren and Lúthien shares elements with folktales such as the Welsh "Culhwch and Olwen". One of these is the disapproving parent who sets a seemingly impossible task (or tasks) for the suitor, which is then fulfilled. The Brothers Grimm folktale "The Devil With the Three Golden Hairs" sets such a task, the King requiring the boy to obtain three golden hairs from the Devil's beard. Another is the hound Cafall, matching Tolkien's Huan, hound of Valinor.

Shippey and Richard C. West have warned that claims about Tolkien's use of sources must be cautious, because as Tolkien said, he thoroughly boiled down his "soup" from the original "bones of the ox" of his sources. Shippey agrees with Alex Lewis and Elizabeth Currie that Tolkien very likely used the Mabinogion, as he certainly knew "Culhwch and Olwen", but finds their suggestion that Tolkien also used von Eschenbach's Parzival as an Arthurian source improbable, stating that "similarity does not prove connection". Shippey adds that the hunt of the giant boar Twrch Trwyth is a "plausible" model for the hunt of Carcharoth the wolf. On the other hand, he writes, the incomplete fulfilment of Chief Giant Yspaddaden's list of items to be supplied for Olwen's hand in marriage does not match the attempt to meet Thingol's demand for the Silmaril, and "the scenes aren't like each other at all!"

The Tolkien scholar John Garth, writing in the New Statesman, notes that it took a century for The Tale of Beren and Lúthien, mirroring the tale of Second Lieutenant Tolkien watching Edith dancing in a woodland glade far from the "animal horror" of the trenches, to reach publication. Garth finds "much to relish", as the tale changes through "several gears" until finally it "attains a mythic power". Beren's enemy changes from a cat-demon to the "Necromancer" and eventually to Sauron. Garth comments that if this was supposed to be the lost ancestor of the Rapunzel fairytale, then it definitely portrays a modern "female-centred fairy-tale revisioning" with a Lúthien who may be fairer than mortal tongue can tell, but is also more resourceful than her lover.

=== Personal life ===
Grave of Edith and J. R. R. Tolkien
| + Edith Mary Tolkien; Luthien; 1889–1971; John Ronald; Reuel Tolkien; Beren; 1892–1973 |

In a letter to his son Christopher, dated 11 July 1972, Tolkien requested the inscription below for his wife Edith's grave "for she was (and knew she was) my Lúthien." (Note: Carpenter 2023, #340 to Christopher Tolkien, 11 July 1972) He added, "I never called Edith Luthien – but she was the source of the story.... It was first conceived in a small woodland glade filled with hemlocks at Roos in Yorkshire where ... she was able to live with me for a while." In a footnote to this letter, Tolkien added "she knew the earliest form of the legend...also the poem eventually printed as Aragorn's song." Particularly affecting for Tolkien was Edith's conversion to the Catholic Church from the Church of England for his sake upon their marriage; this was a difficult decision for her that caused her much hardship, paralleling the difficulties and suffering of Lúthien from choosing mortality.

Edith and J. R. R. Tolkien lie in Wolvercote Cemetery in north Oxford. Their gravestone shows the association of Lúthien with Edith, and Tolkien with Beren.
