= Edith Tolkien =

Wife of J. R. R. Tolkien (1889–1971)

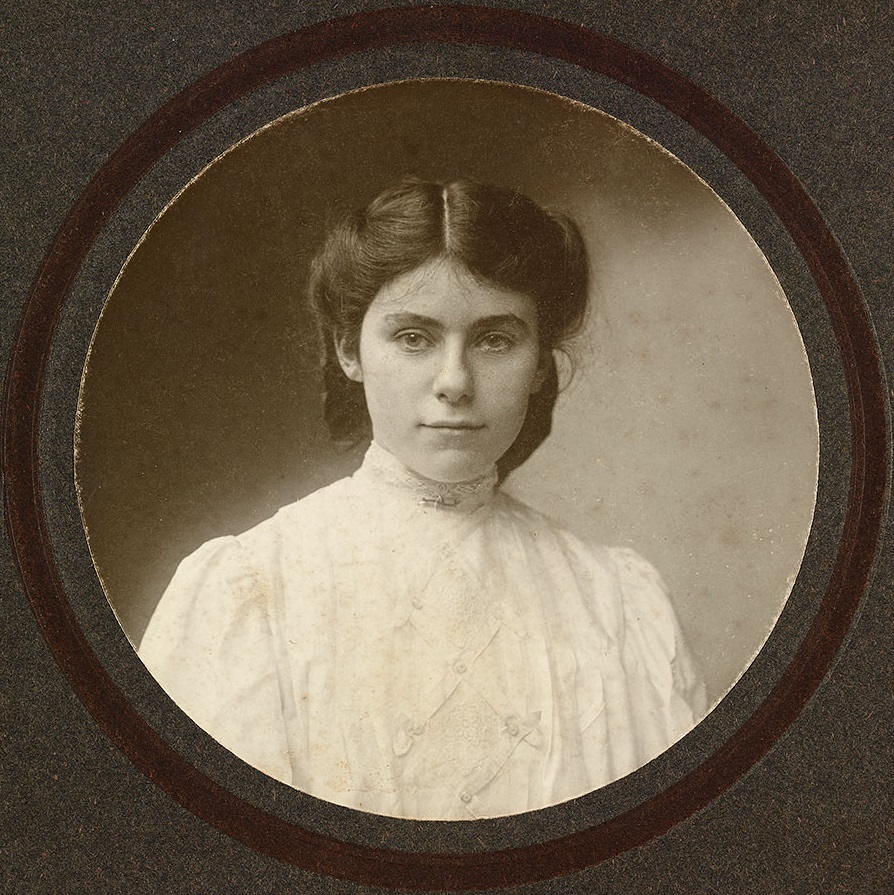
- Edith Bratt in 1906
- Born: Edith Mary Bratt; 21 January 1889; Gloucester, England
- Died: 29 November 1971 (aged 82); Bournemouth, England
- Spouse: J. R. R. Tolkien (m. 1916)
- Children: John; Michael; Christopher; Priscilla

Edith Mary Tolkien (née Bratt; 21 January 1889 – 29 November 1971) was the wife of the academic, philologist, poet, and novelist J. R. R. Tolkien. She served as the inspiration for his fictional Middle-earth characters Lúthien Tinúviel and Arwen Undómiel.

== Biography ==
=== Early life ===
Edith Bratt was born in Gloucester on 21 January 1889. Her mother, Frances Bratt, a governess, was 30 years old, unmarried, and was the daughter of a local shoe and bootmaker.

According to Humphrey Carpenter, Frances Bratt never married, and the name of Edith's father is not listed on her birth certificate. Even so, Frances is reported to have always preserved a photograph of him and his name was known within the Bratt family. Edith, however, was always deeply conscious of having been conceived out of wedlock and never told her own children the name of their grandfather. Subsequent research has identified Edith's father as Birmingham paper dealer Alfred Frederick Warrilow, who had previously employed Frances Bratt as governess to his daughter, Nellie Warrilow. When Warrilow died in 1891, he named Frances as his sole executrix in his will.

Edith was brought up in Handsworth, a suburb of Birmingham, by her mother and also her cousin, Jenny Grove (related to Sir George Grove). According to Humphrey Carpenter, the circumstances of Edith's birth were frequently the subject of neighbourhood gossip.

Frances Bratt died when her daughter was 14 and Edith was sent to the Dresden House boarding school in Evesham. The school was run by the Watts sisters, who had studied music in Dresden. Although the school had a very "strict regime", Edith was always to remember it fondly. It was at the Dresden House School where Edith "first developed her great love, and talent, for playing the piano."

Following school, Edith was expected to become a concert pianist or at the very least a piano teacher. While she considered how to proceed, Edith's guardian, solicitor Stephen Gateley, found her rooms at Mrs. Faulkner's boarding house at 37 Duchess Road, Birmingham.

=== Courtship ===
The boarding house at 37 Duchess Road "was a gloomy, creeper-covered house, hung with dingy lace curtains". It was owned and operated by Mrs. Faulkner, whose husband Louis was "a wine merchant with a taste for his own wares". Mrs. Faulkner was also a Roman Catholic and "an active member" of the parish attached to the nearby Birmingham Oratory.

Mrs. Faulkner hosted musical soirées which were often attended by the Oratory's priests. She was delighted to have, in Edith, a pianist to accompany the soloists. Whenever Edith attempted to practise, however, Mrs. Faulkner "would sweep into the room as soon as the scales and arpeggios began", and say, "Now, Edith dear, that's enough for now!"

In later years, Edith told her children that her life at 37 Duchess Road was "rather restricted". Once, Edith, who "had a lifelong enjoyment of the theatre", announced that she was going to a matinée at the Theatre Royal. In response, Mrs. Faulkner told her that, "she must take a book to read in the interval to avoid the risk of being talked to by strangers!"

Edith first met Tolkien early in 1908, when he and his younger brother Hilary were moved into 37 Duchess Road by their guardian, Fr. Francis Xavier Morgan of the Birmingham Oratory. At the time Tolkien, known within his family as Ronald, was 16 years old and Edith was 19. According to Humphrey Carpenter,

Edith and Ronald took to frequenting Birmingham teashops, especially one which had a balcony overlooking the pavement. There they would sit and throw sugarlumps into the hats of passers-by, moving to the next table when the sugar bowl was empty. ...With two people of their personalities and in their position, romance was bound to flourish. Both were orphans in need of affection, and they found that they could give it to each other. During the summer of 1909, they decided that they were in love.

However, before the end of the year the relationship had become known to Tolkien's guardian. Viewing Edith as a distraction from Tolkien's schoolwork and bothered by her Anglican religion, he forbade any contact between them until Tolkien became a legal adult at 21.

Tolkien grudgingly obeyed this instruction to the letter while Father Morgan's guardianship lasted. Edith's legal guardian, solicitor Stephen Gately, arranged for her to move to Cheltenham to stay with a family friend, solicitor C. H. Jessop and his wife.

Edith lived in relative comfort in the Jessops' spacious house and was waited upon by servants. Unlike at Mrs. Faulkner's house, she could play to her content upon the Jessops' grand piano.

Edith also played the organ at her local Church of England parish, which she later blamed for her subsequent lifetime of back problems. She also joined the Primrose League and attended local Conservative Party meetings. Aside from the local vicar, however, the Jessops hosted few visitors and, aside from her school friend Molly Field, Edith felt starved of companionship of her own age.

Even though Edith affectionately called her hosts "Uncle Jessop" and "Auntie Jessop", Edith later told her children that her host was "a martinet with a strong temper and a weak heart. He dominated his wife, who in turn begged Edith not to cross him. Edith said she would often work out her frustrations on the piano, playing something powerful and stirring, such as a Schubert Impromptu or a Beethoven Sonata. She also spent hours copying music meticulously. One or two of her albums still remain, showing her taste ranging from Classical music to the lighter ballads of the time."

However, on the evening of his twenty-first birthday, Tolkien wrote a letter to Edith, which contained a declaration of his love and asked her to marry him. She replied saying that she had recently become engaged to her friend Molly's brother, Warwickshire farmer George Field, but implied that she had done so only because she felt "on the shelf" and believed that Tolkien had forgotten her. Within a week, Tolkien journeyed to Cheltenham, where Edith met him at the railway station. That day, Edith returned her ring and announced her engagement to Tolkien instead.

=== Marriage ===
According to the couple's children John and Priscilla, "Their respective guardians were not enthusiastic, although Father Francis eventually gave his blessing."

John and Priscilla Tolkien later wrote that while their father was attending Oxford University, "Father Francis sometimes came to visit from Birmingham, once chaperoning Edith. She remembered the train stopping at Banbury and Father Francis insisted upon buying Banbury cakes – the local delicacy – which were very greasy. The grease got everywhere and caused considerable confusion."

Also following her engagement, Edith announced that she was converting to Roman Catholicism at Tolkien's insistence. Because her "Uncle Jessop", "like many of his age and class, was strongly anti-Catholic", Edith, who feared his explosive temper, at first resisted her fiancé's demands. And indeed, when Jessop learned of Edith's decision, he was every bit as enraged as she had feared, and he instantly turned her out of the house.

According to the couple's children John and Priscilla Tolkien, "She found a rented house with her cousin, Jenny Grove, and her dog, Sam, in Warwick... Jenny, known in the family as 'Auntie Ie', became a substitute mother to Edith and the nearest thing her four children had to a grandmother." While at Warwick, Edith was also overjoyed to have her own piano, which she continued to play until arthritis forced her to give it up.

The Tolkiens were married in the Catholic Church of St Mary Immaculate on West Street in Warwick on 22 March 1916 and a blue plaque was unveiled at the church in July 2018 to commemorate this. Their week-long honeymoon was spent at Clevedon, in North Somerset, and included a visit to the Cheddar Caves.

Soon after their wedding, Tolkien commenced a course at the British Army signals school at Otley, and in order to be as close to his military camp as possible, Edith moved with her cousin Jennie Grove to a cottage in the village of Great Haywood, where she lived from April 1916 to February 1917. Owing to their wedding occurring during Lent, only the Marriage Service and not the Nuptial Mass had been performed; the couple received a nuptial blessing at the Roman Catholic Church of St John the Baptist, in Great Haywood. In a 1941 letter to their son Michael, Tolkien expressed admiration for his wife's willingness to marry a man with no job, little money, and no prospects except the likelihood of being killed in the Great War.

=== World War I ===
Tolkien was subsequently commissioned as a second lieutenant into the Lancashire Fusiliers, transferring to the 11th (Service) Battalion, part of the 25th Division, with the British Expeditionary Force. After spending a last night with Edith at the Plough & Harrow Hotel in Birmingham, Tolkien reported to a troop ship at Folkestone and arrived in France on 4 June 1916. He later wrote:

Junior officers were being killed off, a dozen a minute. Parting from my wife then ... it was like a death.

Tolkien's service during the Battle of the Somme was terribly stressful for Edith. According to her children John and Priscilla, "Like thousands of others, our mother longed for the messages Ronald sent. They arrived on official forms, and it was hard to tell much beyond the fact that the sender was still alive. Because of this, our parents devised a private code of dots. Edith kept a large map of France on the wall and could gauge fairly well where Ronald was at any time. During this period she carried the added burden of being Hilary's next of kin: he suffered a number of minor shrapnel wounds while serving as a Private in the Royal Warwickshire Regiment, helping to carry supplies over the notorious Passchendaele Ridge. Each time he was wounded, Edith received a telegram."

==== Homefront ====
After Tolkien's return from France, their first child, John Francis Reuel (16 November 1917 – 22 January 2003) was born in Cheltenham.

While Tolkien was stationed at Kingston upon Hull, Edith and he went walking in the woods at nearby Roos, and she began to dance for him in a clearing among the flowering hemlock:

We walked in a wood where hemlock was growing, a sea of white flowers.

This incident inspired the account of the meeting of Beren and Lúthien, and from that the Song of Beren and Luthien."

==== Post-war ====
After World War I, the Tolkiens had three more children: Michael Hilary Reuel (October 1920 – 1984), Christopher John Reuel (1924–2020) and Priscilla Anne Reuel (1929–2022).

=== Professor's wife ===
Tolkien's professional career at the universities of Leeds and Oxford resulted in the family moving to these cities. According to Humphrey Carpenter, Edith was not an intellectual and had a difficult time functioning around her husband's colleagues and their families. As she often had no companionship other than the children and the servants, Edith's loneliness frequently manifested itself as authoritarianism. Another result of her loneliness was her envy and resentment of Tolkien's close friendship with C. S. Lewis, whom she regarded as an intruder into her family.

According to Carpenter,

There was also the problem of Edith's attitude to Catholicism. Before they were married, Ronald had persuaded her to leave the Church of England and become a Catholic, and she had resented this a little at the time. During the subsequent years she had almost given up going to mass. In the second decade of marriage her anti-Catholic feelings hardened, and by the time the family returned to Oxford in 1925 she was showing resentment of Ronald taking the children to church. In part, these feelings were due to Ronald's rigid, almost medieval, insistence upon frequent confession; and Edith had always hated confessing her sins to a priest. Nor could he discuss her feelings with her in a rational manner, certainly not with the lucidity he demonstrated in his theological arguments with author Lewis: to Edith he presented only his emotional attachment to religion, of which she had little understanding. Occasionally, her smouldering anger about church-going burst into a fury; but at last after one such outburst in 1940 there was true reconciliation between her and Ronald, in which she explained her feelings and even declared that she wished to resume the practice of her religion. In the event she did not return to regular church-going, but for the rest of her life she showed no resentment of Catholicism, and indeed delighted to take an interest in church affairs, so that it appeared even to friends who were Catholics that she was an active church-goer.

=== Later life ===
According to Humphrey Carpenter,

Those friends who knew Ronald and Edith Tolkien over the years never doubted that there was deep affection between them. It was visible in the small things, the almost absurd degree in which each worried about the other's health, and the care in which they chose and wrapped each other's birthday presents; and in the large matters, the way in which Ronald willingly abandoned such a large part of his life in retirement to give Edith the last years in Bournemouth that he felt she deserved, and the degree in which she showed pride in his fame as an author. A principal source of happiness to them was their shared love of their family. This bound them together until the end of their lives, and it was perhaps the strongest force in the marriage. They delighted to discuss and mull over every detail of the lives of their children, and later their grandchildren.

In a 1992 lecture, George Sayer recalled his friendship with the Tolkiens during the 1950s and 1960s,

If I was there in the right time in the afternoon he would take me to have tea in the drawing room of the floor below, Edith Tolkien's room. The atmosphere was quite different, with hardly any papers and few books. She did most of the talking and it was not at all literary. Frequent subjects were the doings of the children, especially Christopher, the grandchildren, the garden in which I think Ronald enjoyed working, the iniquities of the Labour Party, the rising price of food, the changes for the worse in the Oxford shops and the difficulty in buying certain groceries. The road had deteriorated since they moved there. It used to be a quiet cul-de-sac. Now the lower end had been opened up and lorries and cars rushed through on their way to a building site or to the Oxford United's football ground. There were some very noisy people on the road. They even had as near neighbours an aspiring pop group. Ronald... told me that when she was younger Edith had been a fine pianist. Some of the conversation was about music. On one occasion she played to us on a very simple old-fashioned gramophone a record she had just bought. Her husband was relaxed and happy with this domesticity. Anyway, it was an important part of his life. Without a liking for the homely and domestic, he could not have written The Hobbit, or created Frodo and Sam Gamgee, characters that sustain quite convincingly the story of The Lord of the Rings, and link the high romance to the everyday and the ordinary.

After his retirement during the 1960s, Tolkien decided to move with Edith to a location near Bournemouth, which was then a resort town patronised by the British upper class. Although his status as a best-selling author gave them both easy entry into local society, Tolkien was never comfortable in Bournemouth and missed the company of his fellow intellectuals. Edith, however, was at last in her element as a society matron, which had been Tolkien's intention in selecting their new residence in the first place. Their grandson Simon Tolkien states on his website that Edith loved spending time at Bournemouth's Miramar Hotel.

=== Death ===
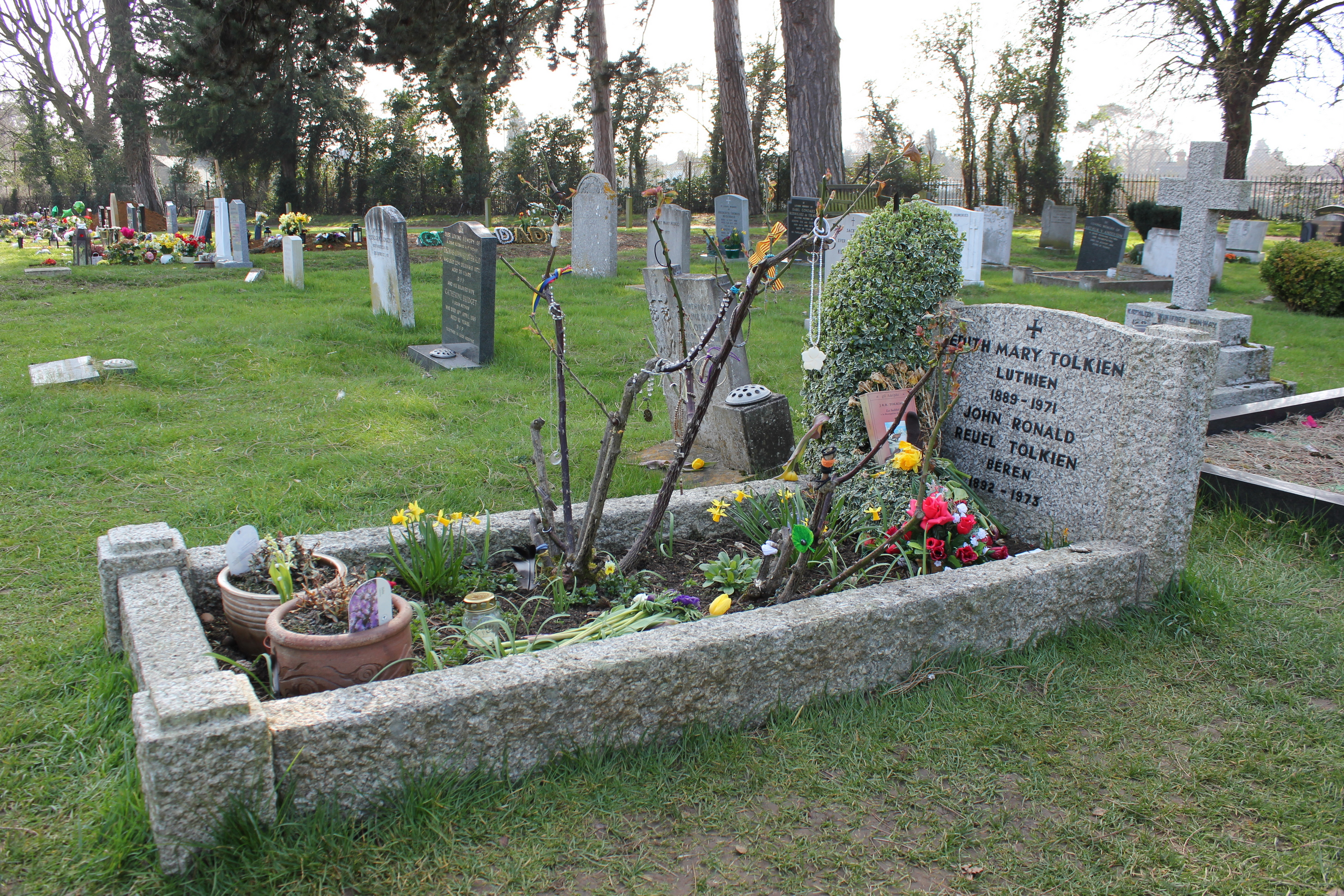
The grave of J. R. R. and Edith Tolkien, Wolvercote Cemetery, Oxford.

Edith Tolkien died on 29 November 1971 in Bournemouth at the age of 82, and was buried in Wolvercote Cemetery, Oxford. Tolkien was buried with her when he died 21 months later.

== Legacy ==
Below the Tolkiens' names on their grave are the names of the characters of Beren and Lúthien: in the Middle-earth legendarium, Lúthien was the most beautiful of all the Children of Ilúvatar, and forsook her immortality for her love of the mortal warrior Beren. After Beren was captured by the forces of the Dark Lord Morgoth, Lúthien rode to his rescue upon the talking wolfhound Huan. Ultimately, when Beren was slain in battle against the demonic wolf Carcharoth, Lúthien, like Orpheus, approached the Valar gods and persuaded them to restore her beloved to life.

Shortly after Edith's death, Tolkien wrote the following in a letter to their son Christopher.

I never called Edith Luthien – but she was the source of the story that in time became the chief part of the Silmarillion. It was first conceived in a small woodland glade filled with hemlocks at Roos in Yorkshire (where I was for a brief time in command of an outpost of the Humber Garrison in 1917, and she was able to live with me for a while). In those days her hair was raven, her skin clear, her eyes brighter than you have seen them, and she could sing – and dance. But the story has gone crooked, & I am left, and I cannot plead before the inexorable Mandos.
