= The Father Christmas Letters =

1974 children's book by J. R. R. Tolkien

Letters from Father Christmas
- First edition
- Editor: Baillie Tolkien
- Author: J. R. R. Tolkien
- Original title: The Father Christmas Letters
- Illustrator: J. R. R. Tolkien
- Cover artist: J. R. R. Tolkien
- Language: English
- Genre: Fantasy, children's literature
- Publisher: Allen and Unwin (1976); Houghton Mifflin (1976); HarperCollins (2004)
- Publication date: 1976, reprinted in 2004
- Publication place: United Kingdom
- Media type: Print (hardback & paperback)
- ISBN: 0-395-24981-3 (1976); ISBN 0-261-10386-5 (2004)
- OCLC: 2603606
- LC Class: PZ7.T5744 Fat4
- Preceded by: Bilbo's Last Song
- Followed by: The Silmarillion

Letters from Father Christmas, formerly known as The Father Christmas Letters, are a collection of letters written and illustrated by J. R. R. Tolkien between 1920 and 1943 for his children, from Father Christmas. They were released posthumously by the Tolkien estate on 2 September 1976, the 3rd anniversary of Tolkien's death. They were edited by Baillie Tolkien, second wife of his youngest son, Christopher. The book was warmly received by critics, and it has been suggested that elements of the stories inspired parts of Tolkien's The Lord of the Rings.

== Plot ==
The stories are told in the format of a series of letters, told either from the point of view of Father Christmas or his elvish secretary. They document the adventures and misadventures of Father Christmas and his helpers, including the North Polar Bear and his two sidekick cubs, Paksu and Valkotukka. The stories include descriptions of the massive fireworks that create the northern lights and how Polar Bear manages to get into trouble on more than one occasion.

The 1939 letter has Father Christmas making reference to the Second World War, while some of the later letters feature Father Christmas' battles against goblins, which were subsequently interpreted as being a reflection of Tolkien's views on the German menace.

== Publication ==
The letters themselves were written over a period of over 20 years to entertain Tolkien's children each Christmas. Starting in 1920 when Tolkien's oldest son was aged three, each Christmas Tolkien would write a letter from Father Christmas about his travels and adventures. Each letter was delivered in an envelope, including North Pole stamps and postage marks as designed by Tolkien.

Prior to publication, an exhibition of Tolkien's drawings was held at the Ashmolean Museum. These included works from The Hobbit, The Lord of the Rings, and the Letters from Father Christmas. The first edition was published by Allen and Unwin on 2 September 1976 under the name The Father Christmas Letters, three years after Tolkien's death. The Houghton Mifflin edition was released later that year on 19 October. It was the third work by Tolkien to be released posthumously, after a collection of poems and the "Guide to the Names in The Lord of the Rings". Edited by Baillie Tolkien, the second wife of Christopher Tolkien, it includes illustrations by Tolkien for nearly all the letters; however, it omitted several letters and drawings.

When the book was republished in 1999, it was retitled Letters from Father Christmas and several letters and drawings not contained in the original edition were added. One edition in 1995 featured the letters and drawings contained in individual envelopes to be read in the manner they were originally conceived to be.

== Reception ==
The reception to the first two works published posthumously had been warm, which was subsequently thought to be due to Tolkien's recent death. The response to the Letters from Father Christmas was much more measured and balanced. Jessica Kemball-Cook suggested in her book Twentieth Century Children's Writers that it would become known as a classic of children's literature, while Nancy Willard for The New York Times Book Review also received the book positively, saying "Father Christmas lives. And never more merrily than in these pages." In 2002, an article in The Independent on Sunday described the work as rivalling "The Lord of the Rings for sheer imaginative joy". In 2023, an extract from one of the Letters from Father Christmas was read out by actor Jim Broadbent at the televised 'Together at Christmas' carol service in Westminster Abbey on Friday 8 December, broadcast to the nation on Christmas Eve that year.

== Influence ==
Paul H. Kocher, whilst writing for the journal Mythprint, suggested that the creatures in the Letters from Father Christmas may have been a precursor to those which appeared in Tolkien's later works such as The Lord of the Rings, a view which was shared by Laurence and Martha Krieg in a review in the journal Mythlore (issue #14). For example, the 1933 letter features an attack on Polar Bear by a band of goblins. The Kriegs suggested that the wizard Gandalf may have been developed from Father Christmas.

== See also ==
- The Life and Adventures of Santa Claus, authored by L. Frank Baum, author of the first 14 Oz books
- List of Christmas-themed literature

== Sources ==
- Johnson, Judith A. (1986). J. R. R. Tolkien: Six Decades of Criticism. Westport, Conn: Greenwood Press. ISBN 9780313250057.
- Drew, Bernard A. (1997). The 100 Most Popular Young Adult Authors: Biographical Sketches and Bibliographies. Englewood, CO: Libraries Unlimited. ISBN 9780585176062.
- Walsh, Joseph J. (2001). Were They Wise Men or Kings?. Louisville, Ky.: Westminster John Knox Press. ISBN 9780664223120.
- Thompson, Kristin (2007). The Frodo Franchise: The Lord of the Rings and Modern Hollywood. Berkeley: University of California Press. ISBN 9780520247741.
