= The Tolkien Trust =

British charity

- Named after: J. R. R. Tolkien
- Formation: 1977
- Type: Charity
- VAT ID no.: Company 8354834
- Registration no.: Charity 1150801
- Legal status: Active
- Purpose: To manage the Tolkien Estate
- Headquarters: Prama House
- Location: Oxford, United Kingdom
- Coordinates: 51.7788°N 1.2657°W
- Website: tolkientrust.org

The Tolkien Trust is a British charity founded in 1977 that manages the money received from J. R. R. Tolkien's estate (the Tolkien Estate). Specifically, the trust enables its trustees, the members of Tolkien's family, to donate regularly to whichever causes they may choose. The trust states that such charitable causes include the "arts, education, environment, homelessness, international development, international relations and peace building, migration, prison reform, and UK and international health and medical research".

In February 2008, together with Tolkien's publisher HarperCollins, the trust filed a suit against New Line Cinema over the profits of The Lord of the Rings film series. The following year in September, a settlement between the Trust and New Line was made, clearing a potential obstacle to the making of a new film series based on The Hobbit.
