= Simon Tolkien =

British writer, grandson of J. R. R. Tolkien

- Born: Simon Mario Reuel Tolkien; 12 January 1959 (age 67); Oxford, Oxfordshire, England
- Education: Trinity College
- Occupations: Novelist, barrister
- Spouse: Tracy Steinberg (m. 1984)
- Children: 2
- Parents: Christopher Tolkien; Faith Faulconbridge
- Writing career
- Years active: 2000-present
- Genre: Legal drama
- Website: simontolkien.com

Simon Mario Reuel Tolkien (born 12 January 1959) is a British novelist and former barrister. He is the grandson of J. R. R. Tolkien, and the eldest child of Christopher Tolkien.

== Biography ==
Simon Tolkien was born in Oxford on 12 January 1959, the only child of Christopher Tolkien and his first wife, Faith Faulconbridge. His parents separated when he was five years old and he grew up with his mother. He was educated at the Dragon School in Oxford and then Downside School. He studied modern history at Trinity College, after which he embarked on a fifteen-year career as a criminal lawyer. He became a barrister in 1994.

In 1984, Tolkien married Tracy Steinberg, who was born in 1962. Steinberg is Jewish. She owned and operated a vintage clothing store in Chelsea, London, called Steinberg & Tolkien, which shut in September 2007. The couple have two children, a son, Nicholas, and a daughter, Anna. Nicholas is a playwright and director whose first play, Terezin, was first staged in June 2017.

As of 2012, Tolkien lives in southern California with his wife.

== Writings ==
In January 2000, Tolkien began writing fiction. His first novel, which he has described as a black comedy, was not accepted for publication. His second novel, a courtroom drama, was published in the United States as The Final Witness in 2002 and in the United Kingdom as The Stepmother in 2003. His second published work, The Inheritance (the first of a trilogy featuring Inspector Trave of the Oxfordshire Criminal Investigation Department), was published in 2010. The second book of the Inspector Trave trilogy, The King of Diamonds, was published in 2011. The third and final book in the trilogy, Orders from Berlin, was published in 2012.

Tolkien's 2016 novel No Man's Land: A Novel was published concurrent with the 100th anniversary of the Battle of the Somme; the middle third of the novel is set in that months-long World War I battle. The novel follows the life of a poor English child and young adult (Adam Raine), beginning with episodes of labour unrest in London and on to the strikes in coal mining communities, class distinctions, and home front experiences of World War I. Simon Tolkien acknowledges that the experiences of Adam Raine only superficially resemble those faced by his grandfather (J. R. R. Tolkien) in the same large long battle of the war, but he wanted to write something that in part paid tribute to his grandfather's pivotal war experience as a young man, only a few years older than the age of the protagonist of No Man's Land.

In June 2025, Tolkien was a guest on the Off the Shelf podcast.

== Reaction to filmed versions of J. R. R. Tolkien's works ==
Tolkien disagreed with the policy of his grandfather's estate in regard to The Lord of the Rings films. When Christopher Tolkien issued a statement that the "Tolkien estate would be best advised to avoid any specific association with the films", Simon Tolkien broke ranks, offering to cooperate with the filmmakers, stating, "It was my view that we take a much more positive line on the film and that was overruled by my father." Following up a 2001 interview with The Independent, Simon in 2003 gave interviews to The Daily Telegraph and other media in which he discussed his strained relationship with his father, describing it as a permanent breach; however, they subsequently reconciled.

As of 2022, Tolkien is a consultant on the Amazon TV series The Lord of the Rings: The Rings of Power.

== Bibliography ==
=== Inspector Trave novels ===
- The Inheritance (2010)
- The King of Diamonds (2011)
- Orders from Berlin (2012)

=== Theo Sterling novels ===
- The Palace at the End of the Sea (2025)
- The Room of Lost Steps (2025)

=== Other works ===
- The Final Witness / The Stepmother (2002)
- No Man's Land (2016)
