= Tolkien Estate =

Legal body managing estate of J. R. R. Tolkien

Tolkien Estate trademark

The Tolkien Estate is the legal body which manages the property of the English writer J. R. R. Tolkien, including the copyright for most of his works. The individual copyrights have for the most part been assigned by the estate to subsidiary entities such as the J. R. R. Tolkien Discretionary Settlement and the Tolkien charitable trust. The various holdings of the Tolkien family, including the estate, have been organized under The Tolkien Company, the directors of which were Christopher Tolkien until August 2017 and his wife Baillie Tolkien, and J. R. R. Tolkien's grandson Michael George Tolkien. The executors of the estate were Christopher Tolkien (died 16 January 2020), who was sole literary executor, and (succeeding J.R.R. Tolkien's lawyer Frank Williamson) Cathleen Blackburn of Maier Blackburn, who has been the estate's solicitor for many years.

== Rights to The Hobbit and The Lord of the Rings ==
Exclusive worldwide rights to motion picture, merchandising, stage and other rights in certain literary works of J. R. R. Tolkien including The Hobbit and The Lord of the Rings were sold by Tolkien himself to United Artists in 1969, reportedly for a small amount, and are currently owned by Middle-earth Enterprises (formerly Tolkien Enterprises), inc., an Embracer Group subdivision, although some rights were retained such as television series of eight or more episodes.

== Legal issues ==
=== Film royalties ===
In February 2008, the Tolkien Trust sued New Line Cinema, the studio behind the Lord of the Rings trilogy, for £75 million claiming they had not received "even one penny" from the films. A request for punitive damages was denied in September. The case was resolved out of court the following year on September 8, with the terms not made public.

In a press release, Christopher Tolkien stated: "The Trustees regret that legal action was necessary, but are glad that this dispute has been settled on satisfactory terms that will allow the Tolkien Trust properly to pursue its charitable objectives. The Trustees acknowledge that New Line may now proceed with its proposed films of The Hobbit".

=== Gambling devices ===
In November 2012 in the United States District Court for the Central District of California, Fourth Age Limited (later Tolkien Estate, Ltd) and other plaintiffs sued several Warner Bros. affiliates alleging copyright infringement, breach of contract, and seeking declaratory relief, arguing that the defendants exceeded the scope of their rights.

The suit alleged that by producing gambling and video games using his characters, the parties had ignored the limitations of the rights purchased more than four decades prior in 1969, contending the original licence to Tolkien's works was limited to the right to sell "tangible" products such as "figurines, tableware, stationery items, clothing, and the like", but did not cover "electronic or digital rights, rights in media yet to be devised or other intangibles such as rights in services". Tolkien's estate claimed that the defendants actions had caused "irreparable harm to Tolkien's legacy".

In March 2013, the Saul Zaentz Co. (doing business as Middle-earth Enterprises), the rightsholder for the Lord of the Rings and Hobbit properties, filed an amended counterclaim against Fourth Age for declaratory relief, breach of the implied covenant of good faith and fair dealing, and quantum meruit. The Warner Parties filed an amended counterclaim against Fourth Age for breach of contract and declaratory relief.

The Tolkien Estate et al. attempted to block these countersuits under California's anti-SLAPP statute, claiming that Warner Brothers was interfering with their right to petition under the First Amendment to the US Constitution. On 11 July 2013, US District Judge Audrey Collins denied a motion to dismiss, disagreeing that what Warner Brothers was doing was making "disguised claims for malicious prosecution" and wrote "these claims arise out of the parties' divergent understanding of the Warner Parties' and Zaentz's rights to The Lord of the Rings and The Hobbit. They are routine contract-based claims and counterclaims". In October 2015 the Court of Appeals for the Ninth Circuit upheld that ruling. The lawsuit was confidentially settled in July 2017.

=== Novel dispute ===
In 2011, the book Mirkwood: A Novel About JRR Tolkien was involved in an intellectual property controversy. It was written in 1997 by Steve Hillard, an American private equity entrepreneur, attorney, author, and television producer. The dispute involving his book was settled in May 2011. The settlement terms included the disclaimer: "This is a work of fiction which is neither endorsed nor connected with The JRR Tolkien Estate or its publisher". The work of Tolkien fan fiction has, according to the scholar Una McCormack, garnered more than its share of attention, while large numbers of "excellent" works of fan fiction by women are overlooked.

== The Lord of the Rings: The Rings of Power ==
In November 2017, Amazon acquired the global television rights to The Hobbit, The Lord of the Rings, and its appendices, found at the end of The Return of the King. Amazon committed to a multi-season television series titled The Lord of the Rings: The Rings of Power. It features stories that are set in the Second Age. Amazon said the deal included potential for spin-off series as well. The press release referred to "previously unexplored stories based on J.R.R. Tolkien's original writings". Amazon is the producer in conjunction with the Tolkien Estate and The Tolkien Trust, HarperCollins and New Line Cinema.

== Christopher Tolkien's resignation ==
In August 2017, at age 92, Christopher Tolkien resigned as a director of the Tolkien Estate and the Tolkien Trust, while remaining as the literary executor. He died on 16 January 2020 at the age of 95.
