= Christopher Tolkien =

British book editor (1924–2020)

- Born: Christopher John Reuel Tolkien; 21 November 1924; Leeds, England
- Died: 16 January 2020 (aged 95); Draguignan, France
- Education: Trinity College, Oxford (BA, BLitt)
- Occupations: Editor; illustrator; academic
- Spouses: Faith Faulconbridge (m. 1951; div. 1967); Baillie Klass (m. 1967)
- Children: 3, including Simon and Adam
- Parents: J. R. R. Tolkien (father); Edith Tolkien (mother)
- Relatives: Hilary Tolkien (uncle); John Tolkien (brother); Priscilla Tolkien (sister)
- Writing career
- Genre: Fantasy
- Notable awards: Bodley Medal (2016)

Christopher John Reuel Tolkien (21 November 1924 – 16 January 2020) was an English academic editor and writer. The son of the author and academic J. R. R. Tolkien, he edited 24 volumes based on his father's posthumously published work, including The Silmarillion and the 12-volume series The History of Middle-Earth, a task that took 45 years. He drew the original maps for his father's fantasy novel The Lord of the Rings. He spent the second half of his life in France, becoming a French citizen.

Outside his father's unfinished works, he edited three tales by Geoffrey Chaucer (with Nevill Coghill) and his father's translation of Sir Gawain and the Green Knight. Tolkien scholars have remarked that he used his skill as a philologist, demonstrated in his editing of those medieval works, to research, collate, edit, and comment on his father's Middle-earth writings exactly as if they were real-world legends. The effect is both to frame his father's works and to insert himself as a narrator. They have further noted that his additions to The Silmarillion, such as to fill in gaps, and his composition of the text in his own literary style, place him as an author as well as an editor of that book.

== Early life and education ==
Christopher Tolkien was born on 21 November 1924 in Leeds, England, the third of four children and the youngest son of J. R. R. and Edith Tolkien (née Bratt). He was educated at the Dragon School in Oxford, and later at the Roman Catholic Oratory School near Reading. He won a place to study English at Trinity College, Oxford at the age of 17, but after a year and a half there he received his call-up papers for military service. He joined the Royal Air Force in July 1943 and at the start of 1944 was sent to South Africa for flight training. He gained his "wings" as a fighter pilot and was commissioned in January 1945. He was given a posting back in England in February 1945, at Market Drayton in Shropshire. In June 1945 he switched to the Fleet Air Arm. While still in the service, he resumed his degree in April 1946; he was demobilised at the end of that year. He took his B.A. in 1948, and his B.Litt. in 1953 under the philologist Gabriel Turville-Petre.

== Career ==
Tolkien was for a long time part of the critical audience for his father's fiction, first as a child listening to tales of Bilbo Baggins (published as The Hobbit), and then as a teenager and young adult offering feedback on The Lord of the Rings throughout its 15-year gestation. He also redrew his father's working maps for inclusion in The Lord of the Rings. His father invited him to join the Inklings, a literary discussion group, when he was 21 years old. His father called this "a quite unprecedented honour". He became a lecturer in English language at St Catherine's Society, Oxford in 1954.

Away from his father's writings, he published The Saga of King Heidrek the Wise: "Translated from the Icelandic with Introduction, Notes and Appendices by Christopher Tolkien" in 1960. Later, he followed in his father's footsteps, becoming a lecturer and tutor in English language at New College, Oxford in 1963.

In 1967, his father named him as his literary executor, and more specifically as his co-author of The Silmarillion. After his father's death in 1973, he took a large quantity of legendarium manuscripts to his Oxfordshire home, where he converted a barn into a workspace. He and the young Guy Gavriel Kay started work on the documents, discovering by 1975 how complex the task was likely to be. In September 1975, he resigned from New College to work exclusively on editing his father's writings. He moved to France and continued this task for 45 years. In all, he edited and published 24 volumes of his father's writings, most of them to do with the Middle-earth legendarium.

In 2016, he won a Bodley Medal, an award that recognises outstanding contributions to literature, culture, science, and communication.

He served as chairman of the Tolkien Estate, the entity formed to handle the business side of his father's literary legacy, and as a trustee of the Tolkien Charitable Trust. He resigned as director of the estate in 2017.

== Editorial work ==
=== The challenge of the legendarium ===
Navigable diagram of Tolkien's legendarium. Most of it is in The History of Middle-earth, a 12-volume account of how J. R. R. Tolkien wrote The Silmarillion and The Lord of the Rings. It combines Christopher's editorial comments with his father's drafts, many of which were handwritten, sometimes partly-erased and often hard to decipher.

J. R. R. Tolkien wrote a great deal of material in the Middle-earth legendarium that remained unpublished in his lifetime. He had originally intended to publish The Silmarillion alongside The Lord of the Rings in the 1950s, but it was rejected by his publisher. Parts of it were in a finished state when he died in 1973, but the project was incomplete. He once called his son his "chief critic and collaborator", and named him his literary executor. Christopher Tolkien organised the masses of his father's unpublished writings, some of them written on odd scraps of paper half a century earlier. Much of the material was handwritten; frequently a fair draft was written over a half-erased first draft, and names of characters routinely changed between the beginning and the end of the same draft. He explained:

By the time of my father's death the amount of writing in existence on the subject of the Three Ages was huge in quantity (since it extended over a lifetime), disordered, more full of beginnings than of ends, and varying in content from heroic verse in the ancient English alliterative metre to severe historical analysis of his own extremely difficult languages: a vast repository and labyrinth of story, of poetry, of philosophy, and of philology ... To bring it into publishable form was a task at once utterly absorbing and alarming in its responsibility toward something that is unique.

=== From The Silmarillion to The History of Middle-earth ===
Christopher Tolkien and Kay produced a single-volume edition of The Silmarillion for publication in 1977. Its success led to the publication of Unfinished Tales in 1980, and then to the far larger project of The History of Middle-earth in 12 volumes between 1983 and 1996. Most of the original source-texts that he used to construct The Silmarillion were published in this way. Charles Noad comments that the 12-volume History had done something that a putative single-volume edition of The Silmarillion with embedded commentary could not have achieved: it had changed people's perspective on Tolkien's Middle-earth writings, from being centred on The Lord of the Rings to what it had always been in Tolkien's mind: Silmarillion-centred. Noad adds that "The whole series of The History of Middle-earth is a tremendous achievement and makes a worthy and enduring testament to one man's creative endeavours and to another's explicatory devotion. It reveals far more about Tolkien's invented world than any of his readers in pre-Silmarillion days could ever have imagined or hoped for."

=== "Great Tales" of the "Elder Days" ===
In April 2007, he published The Children of Húrin, whose story his father had brought to a relatively complete stage between 1951 and 1957, but then abandoned. This was one of his father's earliest stories, its first version dating back to 1918; several versions are published in The Silmarillion, Unfinished Tales, and The History of Middle-earth. The Children of Húrin is a synthesis of these and other sources. It, along with Beren and Lúthien, published in 2017, and The Fall of Gondolin, published in 2018, constituted what J. R. R. Tolkien called the three "Great Tales" of the "Elder Days".

=== Medieval works ===
Christopher Tolkien edited some of his father's works unconnected to the Middle-earth legendarium. The Legend of Sigurd and Gudrún appeared in May 2009, a verse retelling of the Norse Völsung cycle, followed by The Fall of Arthur in May 2013, and by Beowulf: A Translation and Commentary in May 2014.

== Opinions ==
=== Editor or author ===
Vincent Ferré comments that early in the process of editing his father's unpublished writings, "the real nature of Christopher Tolkien's work was a matter of debate, before a more simplistic consensus began to prevail." Christopher Tolkien explained in his 1977 foreword to The Silmarillion that "I set myself therefore to work out a single text, selecting and arranging in such a way as seemed to me to produce the most coherent and internally self-consistent narrative." In Ferré's opinion, "This choice remains one of his [most] distinctive marks on the book", noting that J. R. R. Tolkien had foreseen in a 1963 letter that the presentation of the stories "will need a lot of work ... the legends have to be worked over ... and made consistent ... and they have to be given some progressive shape."

In 1981, the scholar of literature Randel Helms, taking that statement as definitive of Christopher Tolkien's editorial, indeed authorial, intentions, stated in terms that "The Silmarillion in the shape that we have it [a single-volume narrative] is the invention of the son not the father".

Christopher Tolkien disagreed, writing in the foreword to the 1983 The Book of Lost Tales, that the outcome of his work had been "to add a further dimension of obscurity to The Silmarillion, ... about the age of the work ... and about the degree of editorial intrusion and manipulation (or even invention), is a stumbling-block and a source of much misapprehension." In the same foreword, while rebuffing Helms but without explaining why Helms's opinion was wrong, he admitted that the wisdom of publishing The Silmarillion with (unlike The Lord of the Rings) no frame story, "no suggestion of what it is and how (within the imagined world) it came to be", was "certainly debatable". He added "This I now think to have been an error." He noted, too, that the philologist and Tolkien scholar Tom Shippey, in his book The Road to Middle-earth, was "clearly reluctant to see [The Silmarillion] as other than a 'late' work, even the latest work of its author", i.e. that its text owes as much to Christopher Tolkien as to his father. (Note: Shippey writes, for instance, that The Silmarillion was "[J. R. R. Tolkien's] last and boldest defiance of all the practitioners of 'lit.'.")

Ferré records that, much later, in 2012, Christopher Tolkien admitted "I had had to invent some passages", that he had had a dream that his father was anxiously searching for something, and that he had "realized in horror that it was The Silmarillion." In Ferré's view, he should be thought of as "a writer in his own right, and not only as an 'editor' of his father's manuscripts". He gives two reasons for this: that The Silmarillion reveals his own writing style and "the choices he made in 'constructing'" the narrative; and that he had to devise parts of the story, both to fill gaps and when "threads were impossible to weave together".

Christopher Tolkien's editing of the 12 volumes of The History of Middle-earth, using his skill as a philologist, created an editorial frame for his father's legendarium, and for the books derived from it. Ferré comments that this presented his father's writings as historical, a real set of legends from the past, in just the same way that his editing of The Monsters and the Critics, and Other Essays presented his father's essays as scholarly work.

Editorial framing of The Monsters and the Critics, and Other Essays by Christopher Tolkien presents it as a set of scholarly texts.

Christopher Tolkien's editorial framing of the 12 volumes of The History of Middle-earth presents his father's legendarium, and the books derived from it, as a set of historic texts, analogous to the presentation of genuine scholarly works like The Monsters and The Critics; and it creates a narrative voice throughout the series, a figure of Christopher Tolkien himself.

=== Reaction to filmed versions ===
In 2001, Christopher Tolkien expressed doubts over The Lord of the Rings film trilogy directed by Peter Jackson, questioning the viability of a film interpretation that retained the essence of the work, but stressed that this was just his opinion. In a 2012 interview with Le Monde, he criticised the films, saying: "They gutted the book, making an action film for 15 to 25-year-olds." In 2008 he commenced legal proceedings against New Line Cinema, which he claimed owed his family £80 million in unpaid royalties. In September 2009, he and New Line reached an undisclosed settlement, and he withdrew his legal objection to The Hobbit films.

== Personal life ==
Tolkien was married twice. He had two sons and one daughter. His first marriage in 1951 was to the sculptor Faith Lucy Tilly Faulconbridge (1928–2017). They separated in 1964, and divorced in 1967. Her work is featured in the National Portrait Gallery. Their son Simon Mario Reuel Tolkien is a barrister and novelist.

He married Baillie Klass in 1967; they had two children, Adam and Rachel. In 1975, they moved to the south of France, where she edited her father-in-law's The Father Christmas Letters for posthumous publication, and he acquired French citizenship.

In the wake of a dispute surrounding the making of The Lord of the Rings film trilogy, he is said to have disapproved of the views of his son Simon. He felt that The Lord of the Rings was "peculiarly unsuitable for transformation into visual dramatic form", whilst his son became involved as an advisor with the series. They later reconciled, and Simon dedicated one of his novels to his father.

Tolkien died on 16 January 2020, at the age of 95, in Draguignan, Var, France.

== Works ==
As author or translator

- ——— (1953–1957). "The Battle of the Goths and the Huns". Saga-Book (PDF). Vol. 14. pp. 141–163. Archived (PDF) from the original on 9 October 2022.
- ——— (1976) [1st ed. 1956]. Introduction. Hervarar saga ok Heiðreks. By Turville-Petre, Gabriel (corrected reprint ed.). Viking Society for Northern Research. pp. xi–xx.
- The Saga of King Heidrek the Wise (PDF). Translated by ———. 1960. Archived (PDF) from the original on 9 October 2022. Translated from Hervarar saga ok Heiðreks.

As editor

- Chaucer, Geoffrey (1958) [1387–1400]. ———; Coghill, Nevill (eds.). The Nun's Priest's Tale. Harrap.
- Chaucer, Geoffrey (1959) [1387–1400]. ———; Coghill, Nevill (eds.). The Pardoner's Tale. Harrap.
- Chaucer, Geoffrey (1969) [1387–1400]. ———; Coghill, Nevill (eds.). The Man of Law's Tale. Harrap.
- ———, ed. (1975). Sir Gawain and the Green Knight, Pearl, and Sir Orfeo. Translated by J. R. R. Tolkien. George Allen and Unwin.
- Tolkien, J. R. R. (1977). ——— (ed.). The Silmarillion. George Allen & Unwin.
- Tolkien, J. R. R. (1979). ——— (ed.). Pictures by J. R. R. Tolkien. Allen & Unwin.
- Tolkien, J. R. R. (2010) [1980]. ——— (ed.). Unfinished Tales. Grafton.
- Carpenter, Humphrey; ———, eds. (2023) [1981]. The Letters of J. R. R. Tolkien. HarperCollins.
- Tolkien, J. R. R. (2007) [1983]. ——— (ed.). The Monsters and the Critics, and Other Essays. HarperCollins.
- Tolkien, J. R. R. (1983–2002). Tolkien, Christopher (ed.). The History of Middle-earth. HarperCollins.
  - ————— (1983). ——— (ed.). The Book of Lost Tales, part 1. Vol. 1. HarperCollins.
  - ————— (1984). ——— (ed.). The Book of Lost Tales, part 2. Vol. 2. HarperCollins.
  - ————— (1985). ——— (ed.). The Lays of Beleriand. Vol. 3. HarperCollins.
  - ————— (1986). ——— (ed.). The Shaping of Middle-earth. Vol. 4. HarperCollins.
  - ————— (1987). ——— (ed.). The Lost Road and Other Writings. Vol. 5. HarperCollins.
  - ————— (1988). ——— (ed.). The Return of the Shadow. Vol. 6. HarperCollins.
  - ————— (1989). ——— (ed.). The Treason of Isengard. Vol. 7. HarperCollins.
  - ————— (1990). ——— (ed.). The War of the Ring. Vol. 8. HarperCollins.
  - ————— (1992). ——— (ed.). Sauron Defeated. Vol. 9. HarperCollins.
  - ————— (1993). ——— (ed.). Morgoth's Ring. Vol. 10. HarperCollins.
  - ————— (1994). ——— (ed.). The War of the Jewels. Vol. 11. HarperCollins.
  - ————— (1996). ——— (ed.). The Peoples of Middle-earth. Vol. 12. HarperCollins.
  - ————— (2002). ——— (ed.). The History of Middle-earth Index. HarperCollins.
- Tolkien, J. R. R. (2007). ——— (ed.). The Children of Húrin. HarperCollins.
- Tolkien, J. R. R. (2009). ——— (ed.). The Legend of Sigurd and Gudrún. HarperCollins.
- Tolkien, J. R. R. (2013). ——— (ed.). The Fall of Arthur. HarperCollins.
- ———, ed. (2014). Beowulf: A Translation and Commentary. Translated by Tolkien, J. R. R. HarperCollins.
- Tolkien, J. R. R. (2017). ——— (ed.). Beren and Lúthien. HarperCollins.
- Tolkien, J. R. R. (2018). ——— (ed.). The Fall of Gondolin. HarperCollins.

== Sources ==
- Carpenter, Humphrey, ed. (2023) [1981]. The Letters of J. R. R. Tolkien: Revised and Expanded Edition. New York: HarperCollins. ISBN 978-0-35-865298-4.
- Ovenden, Richard; McIlwaine, Catherine, eds. (2022). The Great Tales Never End: Essays in Memory of Christopher Tolkien. Bodleian Library Publishing. ISBN 978-1-8512-4565-9.
- Shippey, Tom (2005) [1982]. The Road to Middle-Earth: How J. R. R. Tolkien Created a New Mythology (Third ed.). HarperCollins. ISBN 978-0-261-10275-0.
