= Toelken =

Toelken is a surname. Notable people with this surname include:

- Barre Toelken (1935–2018), American folklorist
- Ernst Heinrich Toelken (1795–1878), German anatomist, physicist, and archaeologist
- Hellmut R. Toelken (born 1939), Australian botanist
