= Tolkien's poetry =

Lines from "The Sea-Bell"

I walked by the sea, and there came to me,
as a star-beam on the wet sand,
a white shell like a sea-bell;
trembling it lay in my wet hand...

Then I saw a boat silently float
On the night-tide, empty and grey...

It bore me away, wetted with spray,
wrapped in a mist, wound in a sleep,
to a forgotten strand in a strange land.
In the twilight beyond the deep
I heard a sea-bell swing in the swell,...

— from The Adventures of Tom Bombadil, 1962

Tolkien's poetry is extremely varied, including both the poems and songs of Middle-earth, and other verses written throughout his life. J. R. R. Tolkien embedded over 60 poems in the text of The Lord of the Rings; there are others in The Hobbit and The Adventures of Tom Bombadil; and many more in his Middle-earth legendarium and other manuscripts which remained unpublished in his lifetime, some of book length. Some 240 poems, depending on how they are counted, are in his Collected Poems, but that total excludes many of the poems embedded in his novels. Some are translations; others imitate different styles of medieval verse, including the elegiac, while others again are humorous or nonsensical. He stated that the poems embedded in his novels all had a dramatic purpose, supporting the narrative. The poems are variously in modern English, Old English, Gothic, and Tolkien's constructed languages, especially his Elvish languages, Quenya and Sindarin.

Tolkien's poetry has long been overlooked, and has almost never been emulated by other fantasy writers. Readers often skip over the poems in The Lord of the Rings, thinking them an unwelcome distraction. Since the 1990s, Tolkien's poetry has received increased scholarly attention. Analysis shows that it is both varied and of high technical skill, making use of different metres and rarely used poetic devices to achieve its effects. All the poems in The Lord of the Rings were set to music between 1997 and 2005 by The Tolkien Ensemble.

== Context ==
J. R. R. Tolkien (1892–1973) was a scholar of English literature at the University of Oxford. He was a philologist interested in language and poetry from the Middle Ages, especially that of Anglo-Saxon England and Northern Europe. His professional knowledge of poetical works such as Beowulf and Sir Gawain and the Green Knight shaped his fictional world of Middle-earth. His intention to create what has been called "a mythology for England" (Note: Carpenter 2023, #131 to Milton Waldman, late 1951) led him to construct not only stories but a fully formed world with its own languages, peoples, cultures, and history. He is best known for writing the fantasy novel The Lord of the Rings.

== Middle-earth ==
=== The Lord of the Rings ===
Start of "The Road Goes Ever On"
(version in book 1, ch. 1)

The Road goes ever on and on
Down from the door where it began.
Now far ahead the Road has gone,
And I must follow, if I can,
Pursuing it with eager feet,
Until it joins some larger way
Where many paths and errands meet.
And whither then? I cannot say. (Note: Tolkien 1954a, book 1, ch. 1 "A Long-expected Party")

The Lord of the Rings contains at least 61 poems, perhaps as many as 75 if variations and Tom Bombadil's sung speeches are included. The verses include songs of many genres: for wandering, marching to war, drinking, and having a bath; narrating ancient myths, riddles, prophecies, and magical incantations; of praise and lament (elegy); some of these are found in Old English poetry.

Several Tolkien scholars have commented on Tolkien's poetry. Michael Drout wrote that most of his students admitted to skipping the poems when reading The Lord of the Rings, something that Tolkien was aware of. Andrew Higgins wrote that Drout had made a "compelling case" for studying it. The poetry was, Drout wrote, essential for the fiction to work aesthetically and thematically; it added information not given in the prose; and it brought out characters and their backgrounds. Thomas Kullmann and Dirk Siepmann note that all the poems follow in traditional genres, such as Old English charms, elegies, and riddles; Middle English nature songs; or English folklore songs for the nursery, the church, the tavern, the barrack room, festivals, or for activities such as walking. They comment that many of these poems are far from conventional lyrical poetry such as that of Wordsworth or Keats, since evoking "the poet's personal feelings" was not Tolkien's intention. Tolkien indeed wrote in a letter that

the verses in The L.R. are all dramatic: they do not express the poor old professor's soul-searchings, but are fitted in style and contents to the characters in the story that sing or recite them, and to the situations in it." (Note: Carpenter 2023, #306 to Michael Tolkien, October 1968)

Thomas Kullmann's analysis of song genres in The Lord of the Rings
Song genre	Occurs in Old English	Example	Adapted to context
Walking songs	—	"The Road goes ever on and on" "Upon the hearth the fire is red" (Note: Tolkien 1954a, book 1, ch. 3 "Three is Company")	Frodo goes walking, beginning a long and unknown quest
Marching songs	—	"We come, we come with roll of drum" (Note: Tolkien 1954, book 3, ch. 4 "Treebeard")	The Ents go to war, knowing that doom, very likely their own, is approaching
Drinking songs	—	"Ho! Ho! Ho! To the Bottle I Go" (Note: Tolkien 1954a, book 1, ch. 4 "A Short Cut to Mushrooms")	The hobbits relax after frightening encounters with Black Riders in the Shire
Bathing songs	—	"Sing hey! for the bath at close of day" (Note: Tolkien 1954a, book 1, ch. 5 "A Conspiracy Unmasked")	The hobbits take a bath after escaping the perils of The Old Forest
Narrating ancient myths	E.g. "The Fight at Finnsburg" in Beowulf	"An Elven-maid there was of old" (Note: Tolkien 1954a, book 2, ch. 6 "Lothlórien")	In Lothlórien, as the companions recover from the loss of Gandalf, Legolas the Elf sings of times long ago
Riddles	E.g. in the Exeter Book	"Ere iron was found or tree was hewn" (Note: Tolkien 1954, book 3, ch. 8 "The Road to Isengard")	Gandalf hints to Théoden of the Ents he is about to meet
Prophecies	—	"Seek for the Sword that was broken" (Note: Tolkien 1954a, book 2, ch. 2 "The Council of Elrond")	Aragorn and the One Ring are introduced at The Council of Elrond
Magical incantations	E.g. in Lacnunga ("Remedies") "against Water-Elf Disease"	"Three Rings for the Elven-kings under the sky" (Note: Tolkien 1954a, book 1, ch. 2 "The Shadow of the Past")	Gandalf tells Frodo the nature of the ring he has been given
Songs of praise	—	"Long live the Halflings! Praise them with great praise!" (Note: Tolkien 1955, book 6, ch. 4 "The Field of Cormallen")	The Men of Gondor shout praise to Frodo and Sam for destroying the Ring
Elegies	E.g. Scyld Scefing's funeral in Beowulf	"Beneath Amon Hen I heard his cry" (Note: Tolkien 1954, book 3, ch. 1 "The Departure of Boromir")	Boromir's friends and travelling-companions give him a boat-burial

The scholar of humanities Brian Rosebury agrees that the distinctive thing about Tolkien's verse is its "individuation of poetic styles to suit the expressive needs of a given character or narrative moment". Diane Marchesani, in Mythlore, considers the songs in The Lord of the Rings as "the folklore of Middle-earth", calling them "an integral part of the narrative". She distinguishes four kinds of folklore: lore, including rhymes of lore, spells, and prophecies; ballads, from the Elvish "Tale of Tinuviel" to "The Ent and the Entwife" with its traditional question-answer format; ballad-style, simpler verse such as the hobbits' walking-songs; and nonsense, from "The Man in the Moon Stayed Up Too Late" to Pippin's "Bath Song". In each case, she states, the verse is "indispensable" to the narrative, revealing both the characters involved and the traditions of their race.

A little of Tom Bombadil's
song-speech

What? Old Man Willow?
Naught worse than that, eh?
That can soon be mended.
I know the tune for him.
Old grey Willow-man!
I'll freeze his marrow cold,
if he don't behave himself.
I'll sing his roots off.
I'll sing a wind up and
blow leaf and branch away.
Old Man Willow! (Note: Tolkien 1954a, book 1, ch. 6 "The Old Forest")

The poetry of the Shire is, in Tom Shippey's words, "plain, simple, straightforward in theme and expression", verse suitable for hobbits, but which varies continuously to suit changing situations and growing characters. Bilbo's Old Walking Song, "The Road goes ever on and on / Down from the door where it began. Now far ahead the Road has gone, And I must follow, if I can, Pursuing it with eager feet..." is placed at the start of The Lord of the Rings. It reappears, sung by Frodo, varied with "weary feet" to suit his mood, shortly before he sees a Ringwraith; and a third time, at the end of the book, by a much aged, sleepy, forgetful, dying Bilbo in Rivendell, when the poem has shifted register to "But I at last with weary feet / Will turn towards the lighted inn, My evening-rest and sleep to meet". Shippey observes that the reader can see that the subject is now death. Frodo, too, leaves Middle-earth, but with a different walking-song, singing of "A day will come at last when I / Shall take the hidden paths that run / West of the Moon, East of the Sun", which Shippey glosses as the "Lost Straight Road" that goes out of the round world, straight to Elvenhome.

In contrast to the hobbits, Tom Bombadil only speaks in metre. The Tolkien scholar David Dettmann writes that Tom Bombadil's guests find that song and speech run together in his house; they realise they are all "singing merrily, as if it was easier and more natural than talking". (Note: Tolkien 1954a, book 1, ch. 7 "In the House of Tom Bombadil") Such signals are, Forest-Hill asserts, cues to the reader to look for Tolkien's theories of "creativity, identity, and meaning".

Shippey states that in The Lord of the Rings, poetry in the metre of Old English verse is used to give a direct impression of the oral tradition of the Riders of Rohan; Tolkien's "Where now the horse and the rider?" echoes the Old English poem The Wanderer, while "Arise now, arise, Riders of Theoden" is based on the Finnesburg Fragment. In Shippey's opinion, these poems are about memory "of the barbarian past", and the fragility of oral tradition makes what is remembered specially valuable. As fiction, he writes, Tolkien's "imaginative re-creation of the past adds to it an unusual emotional depth." Some of the poems are in alliterative verse, recreating the feeling of Old English poetry, with its use of rhythm and alliteration. Among these are Aragorn's lament for Boromir, which recalls Scyld Scefing's ship-burial in Beowulf. In Shippey's view, the three epitaph poems in The Lord of the Rings, including "The Mounds of Mundburg" and, based on the famous Ubi sunt? passage in The Wanderer, Tolkien's "Lament of the Rohirrim", represent Tolkien's finest alliterative Modern English verse.

=== The Hobbit ===
Start of "Under the Mountain dark and tall"
sung by the dwarves at Erebor

Under the Mountain dark and tall
The King has come unto his hall!
His foe is dead, the Worm of Dread,
And ever so his foes shall fall.

The sword is sharp, the spear is long,
The arrow swift, the Gate is strong;
The heart is bold that looks on gold;
The dwarves no more shall suffer wrong.

The Hobbit contains over a dozen poems, many of which are frivolous, but some—like the dwarves' ballad in the first chapter, which is continued or adapted in later chapters—show how poetry and narrative can be combined.

=== The Adventures of Tom Bombadil ===
The Adventures of Tom Bombadil, published in 1962, contains 16 poems including some such as "The Stone Troll" and "Oliphaunt" that also appear in The Lord of the Rings. The first two poems in the collection concern Tom Bombadil, a character described in The Fellowship of the Ring, while "The Sea-Bell" or "Frodos Dreme" was considered by the poet W. H. Auden to be Tolkien's "finest" poetic work.

=== The Silmarillion ===
The Silmarillion as edited and constructed by Christopher Tolkien does not contain explicitly identified poetry, but Gergely Nagy notes that the prose hints repeatedly at the style of Beleriand's "lost" poetry. The work's varied prose styles imply to Nagy that it is meant to represent a compendium, in Christopher Tolkien's words, "made long afterwards from sources of great diversity (poems, and annals, and oral tales)". (Note: Tolkien 1977, Foreword) Nagy infers from verse-like fragments in the text that the poetry of Beleriand used alliteration, rhyme, and rhythm including possibly iambics.

=== The Lays of Beleriand ===
The start of "The Lay of Leithian"

A king there was in days of old:
ere Men yet walked upon the mould
his power was reared in caverns' shade,
his hand was over glen and glade.
Of leaves his crown, his mantle green,
his silver lances long and keen;
the starlight in his shield was caught,
ere moon was made or sun was wrought.

Tolkien's legendarium, the mass of Middle-earth manuscripts that he left unpublished, contain several long heroic lays, edited by his son Christopher in The Lays of Beleriand. These include the tale of the tragic figure of Túrin Turambar in 2276 lines of verse, The Lay of the Children of Húrin, and the Tale of Beren and Lúthien in some 4200 lines of rhyming couplets, The Lay of Leithian. The fantasy novelist Suzannah Rowntree wrote that The Lays of Beleriand was a favourite of hers. In her view, "the book's main attraction is Part III, 'The Lay of Leithian'". She describes this as "a red-blooded, grand poem, written in a richly ornamented style bordering (in places) on the baroque. At worst this seems a little clumsy; at best it fits the lavish, heroic story and setting." She comments that C. S. Lewis "obviously enjoyed the poem hugely," going so far as to invent scholars Peabody and Pumpernickel who comment on what Lewis pretends is an ancient text.

== Long poems on medieval subjects ==
The Homecoming of Beorhtnoth Beorhthelm's Son is a play, reworking the Old English poem The Battle of Maldon, written in alliterative verse. It represents what critics agree is a biting critique of the heroic ethos, castigating Beorhtnoth's foolish pride.

The Legend of Sigurd and Gudrún contains two long poems, "The New Lay of the Völsungs" and "The New Lay of Gudrun", both inspired by the legend of Sigurd and the fall of the Niflungs in Norse mythology. Both poems are in a form of alliterative verse inspired by the medieval verse of the Poetic Edda.

Lines from "The Fall of Arthur"

Mordred was waking. His mind wandered
in dark counsels deep and secret.
From a window looked he in western tower:
drear and doubtful day was breaking,
grey light glimmered behind gates of cloud.
About the walls of stone wind was flowing;
sea sighed below, surging, grinding.

The Fall of Arthur is an unfinished poem on the legend of King Arthur. It is in some 1,000 stanzas of modern English, in Old English-style alliterative verse. The historical setting is early medieval, both in form and in content, showing Arthur as a Migration period British military leader fighting the Saxon invasion. Tolkien avoids the high medieval aspects of the Arthurian cycle, such as the Holy Grail and the courtly setting. The poem begins with a British "counter-invasion" to the Saxon lands (Arthur eastward in arms purposed).

== Other poems ==
=== Songs for the Philologists ===
Songs for the Philologists is a short, unauthorised collection of poems of philological interest. It was privately printed without Tolkien's permission, and was withdrawn before distribution. It includes 13 by Tolkien; six of those are in Old English, and one, "Bagme Bloma", is one of the few written in Gothic. Tolkien intended them to be sung to familiar tunes; thus Ofer wídne gársecg was an Old English translation of the folk ballad "The Mermaid", beginning "Oh 'twas in the broad Atlantic, mid the equinoctial gales / That a young fellow fell overboard among the sharks and whales"; it was to be sung to "The Mermaid"'s tune, while "Bagme Bloma" was to be sung to the tune of "O Lazy Sheep!" by Mantle Childe.

First verse of "Bagme Bloma"
Tolkien's Gothic

Brunaim bairiþ Bairka bogum
laubans liubans liudandei,
gilwagroni, glitmunjandei,
bagme bloma, blauandei,
fagrafahsa, liþulinþi,
fraujinondei fairguni.

Rhona Beare's translation

The birch bears fine
leaves on shining boughs,
it grows pale green and glittering,
the flower of the trees in bloom,
fair-haired and supple-limbed,
the ruler of the mountain.

=== Collected poems ===
In 2024, the Tolkien scholars Christina Scull and Wayne G. Hammond published The Collected Poems of J. R. R. Tolkien. The work, in three volumes, contains some 195 entries and five appendices, with a total of at least 240 of his poems, depending on how they are counted, of which 70 have not been published before. The collection excludes many of the poems embedded in The Lord of the Rings and The Hobbit, and presents the longer separately published poems as excerpts. Each poem is supported by commentary and draft versions illustrating the history of its creation. Hammond stated that some of the unpublished poems are "remarkably good", while Scull said that they would extend people's "view of Tolkien as a creative writer." She found the incomplete war poem "The Empty Chapel" particularly "affecting". A poem in Old English, Bealuwérig ("Malicious Outlaw"), is Tolkien's translation of Lewis Carroll's "Jabberwocky", complete with invented words.

== Technical skill ==
=== A mixed reception ===
In the early 1990s, the scholar of English Melanie Rawls wrote that while some critics found Tolkien's poetry "well-crafted and beautiful", others thought it "excruciatingly bad." The Scottish poet Alan Bold, similarly did "not think much of Tolkien's poetry as poetry." Rawls wrote that Tolkien's verse was "weighed down with cliches and self-consciously decorative words". On the other hand, Geoffrey Russom, a scholar of Old and Middle English verse, considered Tolkien's varied verse as constructing "good music", with a rich diversity of structure that avoids the standard iambic pentameter of much modern English poetry. The scholar of English Randel Helms described Tolkien's "Errantry" as "a stunningly skillful piece of versification ... with smooth and lovely rhythms". Rebecca Ankeny writes that Tolkien's poetry "reflects and supports Tolkien's notion of Secondary Creation", embedded as it is in the text and lending it substance.

=== Poetic devices ===
Start of the "Song of Eärendil"

Eärendil was a mariner that tarried in Arvernien;
he built a boat of timber felled in Nimbrethil to journey in;
her sails he wove of silver fair, of silver were her lanterns made,
her prow was fashioned like a swan, and light upon her banners laid.

Besides rhyme and metre, Tolkien employs numerous poetic devices suited to the theme and context of individual poems. Several of these can be seen in the longest poem in The Lord of the Rings, the Song of Eärendil. It makes use of rhyme, internal half-rhyme, alliteration, alliterative assonance, and in Shippey's words "a frequent if irregular variation of syntax". These devices serve to convey "an elvish streak ... signalled ... by barely-precedented intricacies" of poem construction, giving a feeling of "rich and continuous uncertainty, a pattern forever being glimpsed but never quite grasped", its goals "romanticism, multitudinousness, imperfect comprehension .. achieved stylistically much more than semantically."

=== Metrical variety ===
Metrical feet and accents
Disyllables
- ◡ ◡: pyrrhic, dibrach
- ◡ –: iamb
  - ◡: trochee, choree
- –: spondee

Trisyllables
- ◡ ◡ ◡: tribrach
  - ◡ ◡: dactyl
- ◡ – ◡: amphibrach
- ◡ ◡ –: anapaest, antidactyl
- ◡ – –: bacchius
  - ◡ –: cretic, amphimacer
  - – ◡: antibacchius
- – –: molossus
- See main article for tetrasyllables.

Kullmann and Siepmann note the wide variety of metres that Tolkien uses, and that he nearly always avoided the most common form of his time, iambic pentameter. Several poems are unrhymed; these are often but not always alliterative, imitating Old English verse, while others are irregular, like "Sing now, ye people of the Tower of Anor". Of the rhymed verse, Tolkien often uses iambic tetrameter, as in "Gil-galad was an Elven-king", and sometimes iambic octameter, like "Eärendil was a mariner that tarried in Arvernien". Less commonly he uses other metres, including the irregular strophic rhyme of "Troll sat alone on his seat of stone", the iambic dimeter of "We come"/"To Isengard", or the ballad stanza of "An Elven-maid there was of old". On a few occasions, Tolkien uses dactylic metres, such as the dactylic trimeter of "Seek for the Sword that was broken", or the dactylic tetrameter of "Legolas Greenleaf long under tree".

Kullmann & Siepmann's analysis of poem metres in The Lord of the Rings
Rhyme?	Allit.?	Example	Metre
No	Yes	"We `heard of the `horns in the `hills `ringing" (Note: Tolkien 1955, book 5, ch. 6 "The Battle of the Pelennor Fields")	4 stresses, 2 per half-line
No	No	"Sing now, ye people of the Tower of Anor" (Note: Tolkien 1955, book 6, ch. 5 "The Steward and the King")	Irregular
Yes	No	"Gil-galad was an Elven-king" (Note: Tolkien 1954a, book 1, ch. 11 "A Knife in the Dark")	Iambic tetrameter
Yes	No	"Eärendil was a mariner that tarried in Arvernien" (Note: Tolkien 1954a, book 2, ch. 1 "Many Meetings")	Iambic octameter
Yes	No	"Troll sat alone on his seat of stone" (Note: Tolkien 1954a, book 1, ch. 12 "Flight to the Ford")	Irregular strophic
Yes	No	"We come, we come with roll of drum"	Iambic dimeter
Yes	No	"An Elven-maid there was of old"	Ballad stanza
Yes	No	"Seek for the Sword that was broken"	Dactylic trimeter
Yes	No	"Legolas Greenleaf long under tree" (Note: Tolkien 1954, book 3, ch. 5 "The White Rider")	Dactylic tetrameter

In a detailed reply to Rawls, the poet Paul Edwin Zimmer wrote that "much of the power of Tolkien's 'prose' comes from the fact that it's written by a poet of high technical skill, who carried his metrical training into his fiction." In Zimmer's view, Tolkien could control both simple and complex metres well, and displayed plenty of originality in the metres of poems such as "Tom Bombadil" and "Eärendil".

=== Sound and language ===
Tolkien's poems are variously in modern English, Old English, Gothic, and Tolkien's constructed languages, especially his Elvish languages, Quenya, such as Namárië, and Sindarin, such as A Elbereth Gilthoniel. Shippey notes that Tolkien believed that the sound of a language conveyed a specific pleasure, even if untranslated.

Start of "Namárië": Galadriel's Lament in Lórien
Quenya, in Tengwar script
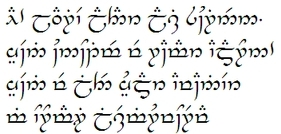

Transliterated Quenya

Ai! laurië lantar lassi súrinen,
yéni únótimë ve rámar aldaron!
Yéni ve lintë yuldar avánier
mi oromardi lisse-miruvóreva...

Translation

Ah! like gold fall the leaves in the wind,
long years numberless as the wings of trees!
The years have passed like swift draughts
of the sweet mead in lofty halls beyond the West,

== Legacy ==
=== In fantasy ===
First verse of "Aeland's epic"
by Poul and Karen Anderson
in their short story "Faith"

Hark! We have heard of Oric the hunter,
Guthlach the great-thewed, and other goodmen
Following far, fellowship vengeful,
Over the heath, into the underground,
Running their road through a rugged portal.

While The Lord of the Rings has given rise to a large number of adaptations and derivative works, the poems embedded in the text have long been overlooked, and almost never emulated by other fantasy writers. An exception is Poul and Karen Anderson's 1991 short story "Faith", in After the King, a 1991 hommage to Tolkien published on the centenary of his birth. The story ends with two stanzas of "The Wrath of the Fathers, Aeland's epic", written in Old English-style alliterative verse.

=== Settings ===
Seven of Tolkien's songs (all but one, "Errantry", from The Lord of the Rings) were made into a song-cycle, The Road Goes Ever On, set to music by Donald Swann in 1967. The Tolkien Ensemble, founded in 1995, set all the poetry in The Lord of the Rings to music, publishing it on four CDs between 1997 and 2005. The settings were well received by critics.

== See also ==
- Tolkien's prose style
