= The Collected Poems of J.R.R. Tolkien =

2024 three volume anthology

- Cover of Volume I
- Editors: Christina Scull and Wayne G. Hammond
- Authors: J. R. R. Tolkien
- Language: English
- Publisher: HarperCollins, William Morrow
- Publication date: 12 September 2024 (UK); 17 September 2024 (US)
- Pages: 1620
- ISBN: 978-0063422711

The Collected Poems of J.R.R. Tolkien is a 2024 book of poetry written by the English philologist, poet, and author J. R. R. Tolkien, edited by the Tolkien scholars, wife and husband Christina Scull and Wayne G. Hammond. Its three volumes contain some 900 versions of 195 poems, among them around 70 previously unpublished.

Reviewers have echoed the editors' remark that readers too easily skip over the poems interspersed with the prose of The Hobbit and The Lord of the Rings, finding them a distraction, when actually the poems contribute substantially and in multiple ways to the reader's understanding of character and mood. Holly Ordway finds the poems valuable, delightful, and moving. John R. Holmes, while enjoying many philological details, objects to the substantial amount of repetition in the book with overlapping drafts and lengthy scholarly presentation. Christian Kriticos further notes the habit of the Tolkien Estate to release snippets of new material alongside substantial amounts that had already been published.

== Background ==
In 2016, two Tolkien scholars, the wife and husband team Christina Scull and Wayne G. Hammond, were invited to work on a collection of J. R. R. Tolkien's poetry; his son Christopher Tolkien, who had edited his father's prose manuscripts, gave his encouragement. Though J. R. R. Tolkien wrote poems starting from childhood, his poetry was less successful than the prose in his books The Hobbit and The Lord of the Rings (which both contained poems embedded in the text). The first poem in the collection is from 1910, addressed to Tolkien's future wife Edith Bratt. Christopher Tolkien shared drafts of poetry, and received several edited poems as an outline of the suggested collection. He died in 2020; the book was approved for publication by HarperCollins and by the Tolkien Estate trustees. Besides previously shared drafts, editors worked with Tolkien's manuscripts from the Bodleian Library of Oxford, Marquette University, and at the University of Leeds.

== Contents ==
Tolkien's Collected Poems is organised chronologically, with complete sets of drafts, but only samples of several works, including some still unpublished like Tolkien's verse translation of part of Beowulf.

The editors note that the book is the "collected poems", not "complete poems" of Tolkien. Three volumes contain more than 1500 pages, and the editors decided to include only a selection of the hundred-odd poems from The Hobbit and The Lord of the Rings. Long poems that were published separately are included as excerpts (The Legend of Sigurd and Gudrún, The Fall of Arthur, and The Lays of Beleriand), as are his poetic translations of Beowulf and Sir Gawain and the Green Knight. Some poems that were written in other languages than English are not included, though the collection contains several poems in Old and Middle English, Latin, Gothic, Quenya, and Sindarin.

All poems from the 1936 collection, Songs for the Philologists, are included. The collection is structured chronologically. Poems are shown in different versions, gathered from Tolkien's manuscripts, and have commentaries by the editors.

The book contains 195 entries; 73 of them were previously unpublished. Many poems appear in multiple versions, showing their evolution; one poem has 22 different versions. Overall, there are almost 700 poem versions in the volumes. The unpublished works include humorous poems, a translation of "Jabberwocky", and some war poems that deal with war indirectly, via soldiers' feelings and relationships. Other themes are Tolkien's love of Edith Bratt and his Middle-earth legendarium. Every poem is accompanied by a commentary on how it came to be written, details of Tolkien's life in relation to the poem, and the poem's subject matter.

The appendices contain further poems, namely short limericks and clerihews; Latin adages; the Old English Bealuwérig; and Tolkien's poem lists and word lists. There is a glossary, a bibliography, and an index. The book is illustrated with a full-colour frontispiece, and six monochrome plates. Among the illustrations are reproductions of some of Tolkien's manuscripts.

Samples of Tolkien's poetry
From "Tinfang Warble"
(an early poem)

O the hoot! O the hoot!
How he trillups on his flute!
O the hoot of Tinfang Warble!
Dancing all alone,
Hopping on a stone,
Flitting like a fawn,
In the twilight on the lawn,
And his name is Tinfang Warble!

From "The Lay Of The Children Of Húrin"
(a long poem in alliterative verse)

Túrin Son of Húrin & Glórund the Dragon
Lo! the golden dragon / of the God of Hell,
the gloom of the woods / of the world now gone,
the woes of Men, / and weeping of Elves
fading faintly / down forest pathways,
is now to tell, / and the name most tearful
of Niniel the sorrowful, / and the name most sad
of Thalion's son Túrin / o'erthrown by fate.

From "Eärendil Was a Mariner"
(a poem in The Lord of the Rings)

Eärendil was a mariner that tarried in Arvernien;
he built a boat of timber felled in Nimbrethil to journey in;
her sails he wove of silver fair, of silver were her lanterns made,
her prow was fashioned like a swan, and light upon her banners laid.

== Reception ==
=== Raising the poems' profile ===
The Christian commentator and Tolkien scholar Holly Ordway echoes the editors' comment that "Many who enjoy [Tolkien's] stories of Middle-earth pass over their poems very quickly or avoid them altogether, either in haste to get on with the prose narrative or because they dislike poetry in general, or think they do. It is their loss." She notes that the short 1962 collection The Adventures of Tom Bombadil was the only earlier stand-alone volume of Tolkien's verse, and that the linking of his verse with a Middle-earth character "may have made it less likely for readers to consider his poetry on its own merits." The Collected Poems is in her view "an astonishment of riches", most of the poems "brand new" even to scholars like herself. She finds it "easy to dip in and read just the poems, if one wishes," and describes the 55-page introduction in Volume 1 "highly informative".

=== Quality of the poetry ===
Ordway writes that the publication is a major literary event, its poems "moving, delightful, and compelling in themselves, and also valuable for insight into Tolkien's personal and creative growth." The collection shows that despite all the scholarship devoted to Tolkien, "his genius has not yet been fully explored".

Reviewing the work for Los Angeles Review of Books, Christian Kriticos writes that beside the impatient readers noted by the editors, others "come to realize that the poems are the heart of the novel." Among their functions are showing the character of each race of Middle-earth beings; lending depth with "mysterious names and places"; and indicating hidden traits of the protagonists. Kriticos finds the poems' diversity "quite astonishing", their tone ranging from "ponderously serious to the excessively childish". He comments that this is matched by the range of verse forms that Tolkien employs, from medieval octosyllabic couplets and Longfellow's trochaic tetrameters to Gilbert and Sullivan's "Modern Major-General's Song" in his poem "Errantry". He writes that poems like "Scatha the Worm" (a dragon) "must be acknowledged as a rare and valuable treasure." Kriticos concludes that while the editors note that Tolkien's poetry has been criticised, and they explicitly "make no claim to greatness for Tolkien as a poet", the world is, all the same, interested in his poems. He states that since Tolkien did write The Lord of the Rings, that context colours the meaning of his poetry: like all artistic works, they do not exist in isolation. The poems offer fresh insight into the man, even if, in Kriticos's view like the "godlike figures of his legendarium", his creative genius cannot be fully comprehended.

Dalya Alberge, for The Observer, notes how Tolkien's war poems are "metaphorical works that are concerned with life, loss, faith and friendship rather than trenches and battles." She notes that Scull was specially touched by "The Empty Chapel", about a soldier who hears drums and marching boots. She comments, too, on oddities like "Monday Morning" about the perils of getting up and skidding on the soap; or Bealuwérig, its title an Old English echo of Lewis Carroll's "Jabberwocky". She concludes with the editors' view that the poems are "integral to the stories", "help to drive their plots and contribute to character and mood."

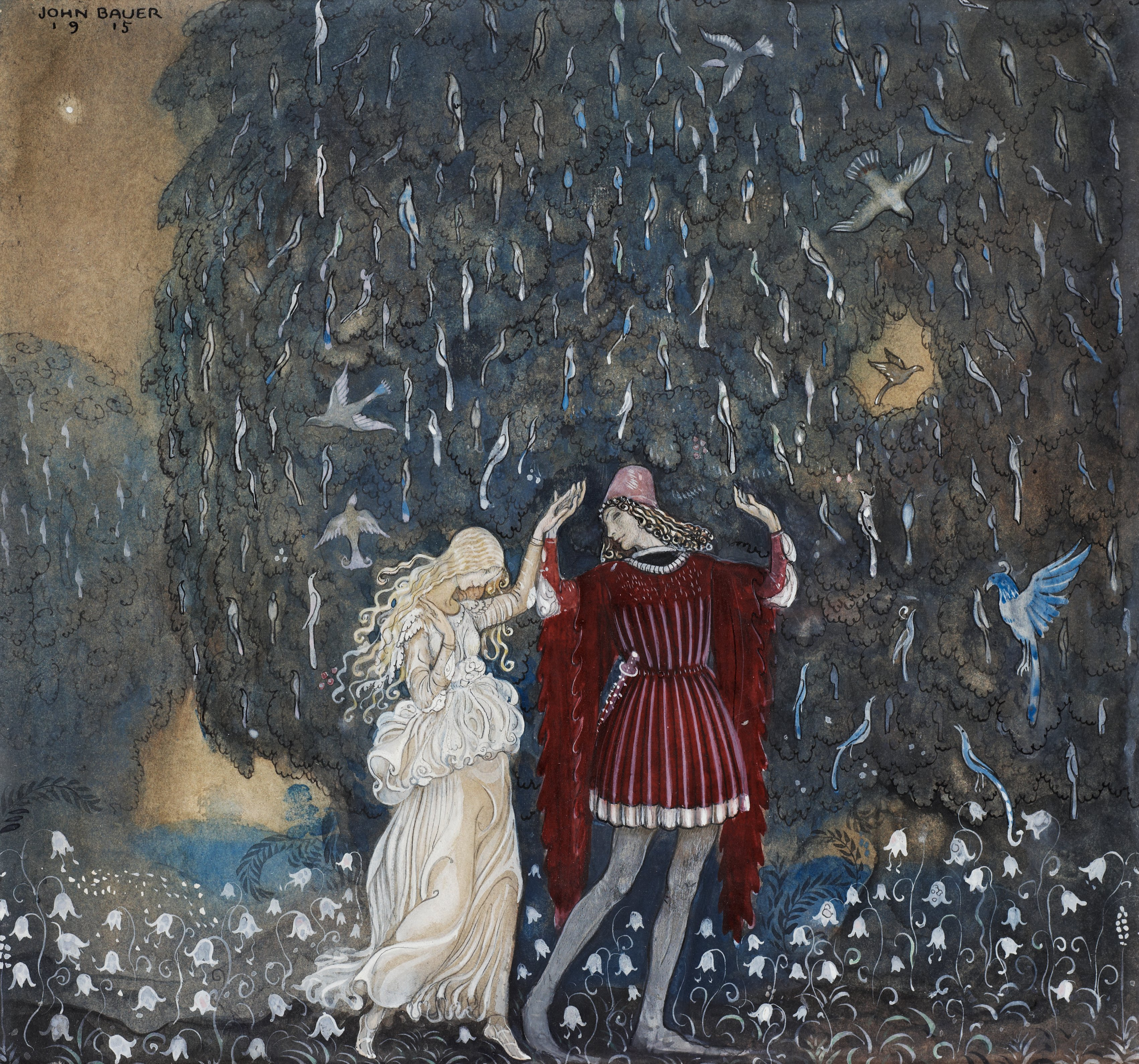
Tolkien's work, including his poetry, has been said to embody a dynamic of disenchantment and re-enchantment. Painting Lena dances with the knight, John Bauer, 1915 depicts an enchanted landscape.

The Conversation writes that the poetry is part of the Tolkien scholar Verlyn Flieger's dynamic or dialectic of disenchantment, as seen in "The Sea-Bell", combined with and opposed by re-enchantment, as seen in "the elven-realm of Lothlórien".

The Tolkien Collector's Guide states that the three volumes are "packed full of new material and brilliant commentary." The review's four pseudonymous editors each recommend a couple of their favourite poems in the collection, including "#69 Iúmonna Gold Galdre Bewunden - The Hoard", "Appendix IV. Word Lists" (words and phrases in literature that Tolkien especially liked), "#90 Pearl" (the medieval poem that he translated), and "#185 The Complaint of Mîm the Dwarf".

Tolkien's biographer John Garth writes in The Times Literary Supplement that, as The Silmarillion's creation myth indicates, the world of Middle-earth is shaped by "heavenly music"; his fiction is shaped both by his moral values and by "the music of language". Garth writes that this musicality, and use of older verse forms, allowed Tolkien "at his inventive best" to write poetry "as if for an intricate, delightful dance." Viewing the question of how Tolkien could achieve this from the point of view of biography, Garth notes that he read classical poetry by Virgil and Homer when at school, and was made to translate poetry from both Latin and Greek. He was attracted to writing poetry by its technical difficulty, which suited "his perfectionism ... [and] his ear for sound." Further, even his earliest poetry was "written to enchant".

=== Readership ===
Paolo Pizzimento, reviewing the book for the Associazione Italiana Studi Tolkieniani, wrote that it had long been awaited by scholars and Tolkien fans. It was however, in his view, neither a normal poetry collection consisting solely of finished texts, intended for the general public; nor exactly a critical edition, seeking to define the original or best form of the author's works, intended for scholars. Instead, it was an odd hybrid, making it hard to see what the book's intended readership might be. In addition, Pizzimento writes, the handling of multiple versions was distinctly repetitive. It would in his view have been better to reduce the repetition and to have devoted more of the available space to Tolkien's longer poems.

=== Presentation ===
John R. Holmes, in Journal of Tolkien Research, summarises his 40-page review, which even has a section on the glossary, by concluding that the book "is not reader-friendly." Among his reasons is the fact that the first lines of the poems are not indexed, "nor is there a separate first-line index, which used to be standard in poetry collections, and is sorely missed." He sees that as one of many instances of a poor "editorial philosophy". Another reason is the way each of the entries is labelled: instead of having a heading at the top of every two-page spread like 'The Horns of Ylmir (1912–1917)', there's just 'Item 13', in his view hardly helpful for navigation.

Holmes writes that "the text is just too indiscriminate. It sprawls." Holmes comments that more efficient methods for dealing with multiple versions are well known to editors of everything from Shakespeare to William Blake's poetry, for instance. He comments that "even as the Baggins side of the reviewer complains about the needless multiplication of texts, the Tookish side rejoices at the access to variants (which, of course, a more streamlined text would still give us)." Holmes is, in short, fascinated by the many philological details and insights into Tolkien's mind that the text provides, and infuriated by what he sees as a cluttered, repetitive presentation of the mass of drafts. Henry Oliver in Prospect comments that a poem like "Moonshine", "hardly Tolkien's best work", takes up five pages with three versions and scholarly notes, making for an unrewarding read. Far better, in Oliver's view, is the treatment of "For W.H.A." (the poet W. H. Auden) which is covered in three pages "with a translation and brisk note" and no repetition.

Holmes wonders, too, at the method of selection among many comparable items: The Hobbit is represented by only 8 out of 24 poems that it contains, and he wonders why it should have been necessary to omit any of them, and why the chosen poems are described so imprecisely, rather than analysed in terms of the placement of stresses and Tolkien's willingness in a poem like Chip the Glasses and Crack the Plates! to write "counter to the iambic 'norm' of English verse".

Kriticos objects to the way that the Tolkien Estate "recycles" Tolkien's published writings, releasing "small snippets of new material", padded out with previously released content. Shawn Cooper in The European Conservative agrees, remarking the productivity of the Tolkien industry, with a steady stream of reissues and reframings "of already-published work". In his view, no book review is needed, given the many years of scholarly attention, as the poems are certainly part of the Tolkien canon even if they were not of "such interest and truly splendid quality." Cooper therefore reviews the editor's choices, not the poems. He agrees with their decision to do their best to use a chronological order, despite the impossibility of dating some of the work. He praises the "exceptional and extensive" introduction, and finds the textual apparatus "as thorough as could be wished", and up to Christopher Tolkien's editorial standards. He admires, too, the bibliography which should, he hopes, support Tolkien scholars in studying "Tolkien's poetics." He has praise, too, for the production quality of the books and their bindings.

== Impact ==
The Tolkien scholar Sara Brown has launched a lecture/discussion course "The Poetic Corpus of J.R.R. Tolkien: Tolkien's Collected Poems (The Years 1910–1967 in Three Volumes)" for January 2025 at Signum University.

== Sources ==
- Holmes, John R. (2024). "[Review:] The Collected Poems of J.R.R. Tolkien (2024), edited by Christina Scull and Wayne G. Hammond". Journal of Tolkien Research. 20 (1). Article 8.
- Tolkien, John Ronald Reuel (2024). Scull, Christina; Hammond, Wayne G. (eds.). The Collected Poems of J. R. R. Tolkien. William Morrow. ISBN 978-0-06-342271-1.
