= Ronald Kyrmse =

- Born: April 30, 1952 (age 74); Brazil
- Occupations: Translator, scholar
- Known for: Translating works of J.R.R. Tolkien into Brazilian Portuguese

Ronald Kyrmse (born 30 April 1952 in Curitiba and living in São Paulo, Brazil since 1975) has been active in researching and propagating the works of J.R.R. Tolkien. He has worked as a translation consultant or translator of JRRT's main works (and works about the author) into Brazilian Portuguese. His translations include Unfinished Tales, The Adventures of Tom Bombadil, The Children of Húrin, The Legend of Sigurd and Gudrún, Letters from Father Christmas, Tree and Leaf, The Fall of Arthur, Smith of Wootton Major, Beowulf: A Translation and Commentary, The Story of Kullervo and Beren and Lúthien (as Contos Inacabados, As Aventuras de Tom Bombadil, Os Filhos de Húrin, A Lenda de Sigurd e Gudrún, Cartas do Papai Noel, Árvore e Folha, A Queda de Artur, Ferreiro de Bosque Grande, Beowulf: Uma Tradução Comentada, A História de Kullervo and Beren e Lúthien respectively). His most recent works are a new translation of The Lord of the Rings, published in late 2019 by HarperCollins Brasil as O Senhor dos Anéis, and participation in translating The Nature of Middle-earth as A Natureza da Terra-média together with Reinaldo Lopes and Gabriel Brum (2021).

Besides his involvement in translation, he has himself written Explicando Tolkien [Explaining Tolkien], a book of essays about Tolkien's life and work (Martins Fontes, São Paulo, 2003; ISBN 978-85-336-1917-3).
