= Song of Eärendil =

Poem in The Lord of the Rings novel by J. R. R. Tolkien

The "Song of Eärendil" is the longest poem in The Lord of the Rings. In the fiction, it is sung and composed by the Hobbit Bilbo Baggins in the Elvish sanctuary of Rivendell. It tells how the mariner Eärendil tries to sail to a place of paradise, and acquires a Silmaril, a prized sun-jewel. Eventually he and his ship are set in the heavens to sail forever as the light of the Morning Star.

The work is described by the philologist and Tolkien scholar Tom Shippey as exemplifying "an elvish streak ... signalled ... by barely-precedented intricacies" of poetry. This corresponds to the tradition of complex poetic mechanisms seen in the Middle English poem Pearl. The "Song of Eärendil" was written to contrast with another of Tolkien's poems, "Errantry", which uses the same mechanisms to quite different effect. In the narrative, the Hobbit Frodo Baggins, recently healed from a dangerous wound, listens to the poem in Keatsian style.

== History of composition ==
The longest poem in The Lord of the Rings is the "Song of Eärendil", also called Eärendillinwë in a different version. This poem has an extraordinarily complex history. Long before writing The Lord of the Rings, Tolkien wrote a poem he called "Errantry", probably in the early 1930s, published in The Oxford Magazine on 9 November 1933. Although this fanciful poem does not mention Eärendil, nor any names or events from his mythology, Bilbo Baggins's song ultimately derives from it. There are six extant texts representing different versions of the poem in Tolkien's papers, along with 15 additional manuscripts and typescripts of Bilbo's song reflecting several lines of development. On that evidence, it appears that the version Tolkien submitted to his publisher—and which was ultimately published—was not his final version. That version was likely misplaced, and an earlier draft was printed instead. (Note: Tolkien 1989, pp. 84–105)

== Narrative ==
Arda in the First Age. The Sun and Moon sail in ships over the world. The Blessed Realm of Valinor lies across the great sea, west of Middle-earth. Eärendil sails the seas, until eventually he and his ship, too, are set in the heavens, shining as the Morning Star.

The poem tells the story of how in the First Age of Middle-earth the mariner Eärendil, half-Man, half-Elven, tries to sail to some sort of paradise. Eventually he acquires a Silmaril, a forged sun-jewel, and he and his ship are set in the heavens to sail forever as the light of the Morning Star, as described in one of the verses:

A ship then new they built for him
of mithril and of elven-glass
with shining prow; no shaven oar
nor sail she bore on silver mast:
the Silmaril as lantern light
and banner bright with living flame
to gleam thereon by Elbereth
herself was set, who thither came
and wings immortal made for him,
and laid on him undying doom,
to sail the shoreless skies and come
behind the Sun and light of Moon. (Note: Tolkien 1954a, book 2, ch. 1 "Many Meetings")

== Reception ==
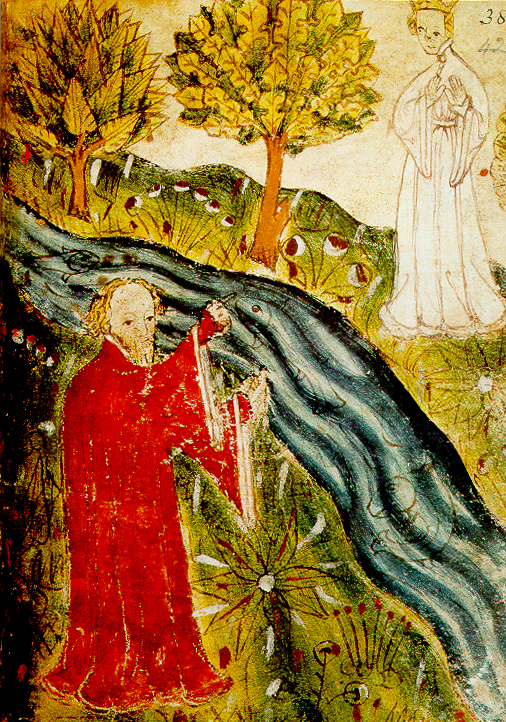
The "Song of Eärendil" follows the Middle English poem Pearl (miniature from the Cotton Nero manuscript pictured) in its metrical and poetic intricacy.

Scholars have identified multiple functions of the poem, including that of providing some backstory.

=== Medieval complexity ===
The "Song of Eärendil" is described by Tom Shippey as exemplifying "an elvish streak .. signalled .. by barely-precedented intricacies" of poetry. He said that the Elvish tradition corresponded to a real English tradition, that of the Middle English poem Pearl. It makes use of an attempt at immortality and a "fantastically complex metrical scheme" with many poetic mechanisms, including alliteration as well as rhyme; for example, it begins "Perle, plesaunte to prynces paye / To clanly clos in golde so clere". Shippey said that the tradition of such complex verse had died out before the time of Shakespeare and Milton, in his view a loss to those poets and their readers, and that "Tolkien obviously hoped in one way to recreate it", as he sought to create a substitute for the lost English mythology.

Shippey states that five mechanisms are used by Tolkien in The Song of Eärendil to convey an "elvish" feeling of "rich and continuous uncertainty, a pattern forever being glimpsed but never quite grasped", its goals "romanticism, multitudinousness, imperfect comprehension ... achieved stylistically much more than semantically". The mechanisms are rhyme, internal half-rhyme, alliteration, alliterative assonance, and "a frequent if irregular variation of syntax". They can be seen in the first stanza of the long poem, only some of the instances being highlighted:

Line	"Song of Eärendil" Stanza 1: building his ship	Poetic mechanisms identified by Tom Shippey
1	Eärendil was a mariner	Internal half-rhyme with 2
2	that tarried in Arvernien;	Rhymes with 4 (intentionally imperfect)
3	he built a boat of timber felled	Alliteration, and possible assonance Internal half-rhyme with 4
4	in Nimbrethil to journey in;	
5	her sails he wove of silver fair,	Alliterative assonance Grammatical repetitions and variations
6	of silver were her lanterns made,	Grammatical repetitions and variations Rhymes with 8
7	her prow was fashioned like a swan,	Internal half-rhyme with 8
8	and light upon her banners laid.	Alliteration

=== Keatsian effect ===
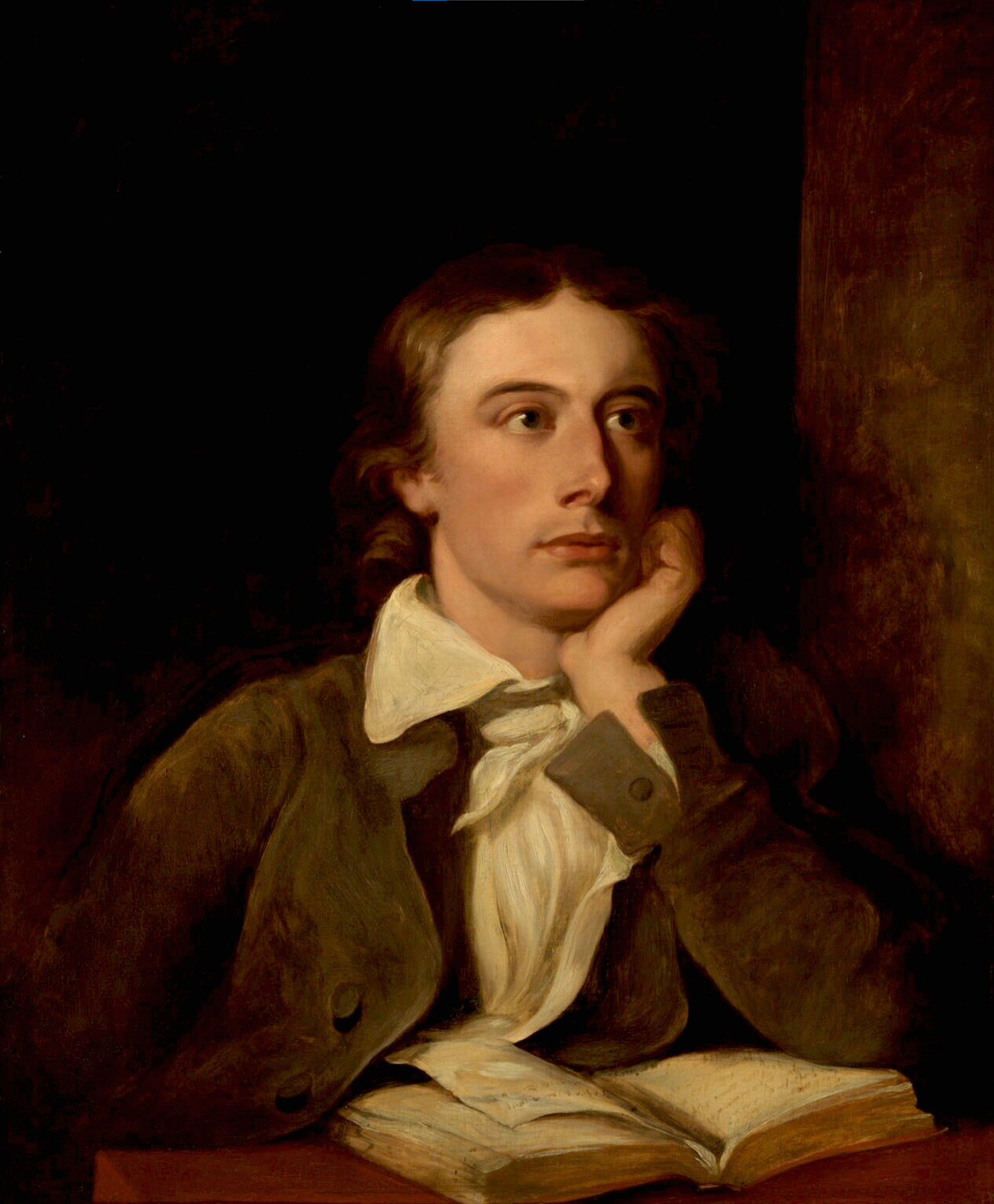
Frodo listens to the Song of Eärendil "in highly Keatsian style". Portrait of John Keats by William Hilton, c. 1822

In the narrative, the Hobbit Frodo Baggins, more or less healed after being stabbed with a Morgul-knife by a Black Rider, (Note: Tolkien 1954a, book 1, ch. 12, "Flight to the Ford") sits listening to the Elvish music, falling into a trancelike state, until he hears "Song of Eärendil" which his cousin Bilbo sings, and supposedly composed, at Elrond's house, Rivendell:

At first the beauty of the melodies and of the interwoven words in elven-tongues, even though he understood them little, held him in a spell, as soon as he began to attend to them. Almost it seemed that the words took shape, and visions of far lands and bright things that he had never yet imagined opened out before him; and the firelit hall became like a golden mist above the seas of foam that sighed upon the margins of the world. Then the enchantment became more and more dreamlike, until he felt that an endless river of swelling gold and silver was flowing over him, too multitudinous for its pattern to be comprehended; it became part of the throbbing air about him, and it drenched and drowned him. Swiftly he sank under its shining weight into a deep realm of sleep.

There he wandered long in a dream of music that turned into running water, and then suddenly into a voice. It seemed to be the voice of Bilbo chanting verses. Faint at first and then clearer into words.

The Tolkien scholars Wayne G. Hammond and Christina Scull wrote that in this passage the effect of the Elvish song is like that of "Faërian drama" as described by Tolkien in his essay "On Fairy-Stories", where you "think you are bodily inside its Secondary World". Shippey said of the same passage that "Frodo indeed finds himself listening in highly Keatsian style" and that the poem offers Wordsworthian "romantic glimpses of 'old unhappy far-off things'", (Note: Shippey is quoting from Wordsworth's "The Solitary Reaper".) as well as echoes of Keats's lines:

Charm'd magic casements, opening on the foam
Of perilous seas, in faery lands forlorn

— from Ode to a Nightingale

with Shippey's emphasis on Keats's alliteration and assonance, similar to some of the devices used by Tolkien in his poem.

=== Contrasting poems ===
Paul H. Kocher writes that "Errantry" and the "Song of Eärendil" are "obviously designed for contrast", as if Tolkien had set himself the challenge of using the same theme of endless wandering, the same metrical forms and the same rhyming schemes, to see if it would be possible to create both a tragedy and an "airy jest": "Looking at the passages picturing the armour of the two heroes we can see both the similarity in structure and the polarity in tone".

Kocher's comparison of the descriptions of armour in "Eärendil" and "Errantry", to opposite effect
"Eärendil", a tragedy	"Errantry", an "airy jest"
In panoply of ancient kings, In chained rings he armoured him; His shining shield was scored with runes To ward all wounds and harm from him; His bow was made of dragon-horn, His arrows shorn of ebony, Of silver was his habergeon, His scabbard of chalcedony; His sword of steel was valiant, Of adamant his helmet tall, An eagle-plume upon his crest, Upon his breast an emerald.	He made a shield and morion of coral and of ivory, a sword he made of emerald,... Of crystal was his habergeon, His scabbard of chalcedony; with silver tipped at plenilune his spear was hewn in ebony. His javelins were of malachite and stalactite — he brandished them.

=== Success and failure ===
Verlyn Flieger picks up a question Shippey asked while discussing the poem, namely, what is the relationship of success and failure in the story. Shippey noted that on the one hand, Eärendil's Silmaril was called "The Flammifer of Westernesse", the victory-emblem of Númenor; but that on the other hand, it was linked "with loss and homelessness, with the weeping of women". Flieger writes that both in the poem and in The Silmarillion, light is a positive symbol of the creation, but the Silmarils have a powerful negative impact.

=== Spaceship ===
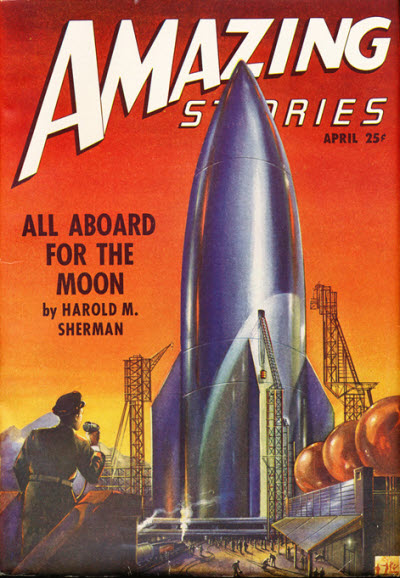
Eärendil's ship Vingilótë sails the sky and is made "of mithril and of elven-glass", much like the image of a spaceship. Cover of Amazing Stories, 1947

Eärendil's ship Vingilótë, which sails the "shoreless skies ... behind the Sun and light of Moon", is described in the poem as "A ship then new they built for him / of mithril and of elven-glass", mithril being (in the world of the story) a fantastically light, strong and malleable metal. The linguist of Elvish languages Anthony Appleyard wrote that this machine, with "no shaven oar nor sail", was evidently of an advanced technology, "sound[ing] suspiciously like most people's image of a spaceship".

== Settings ==
The song was recorded by The Tolkien Ensemble on their 2005 CD Leaving Rivendell. The composer Stephen Eddins considers Hall's setting of the song to be the most successful in the album. It is played on guitar by Peter Hall and sung by the Scottish musician Nick Keir, and to Eddins it "sounds authentically rooted in Celtic folk music, with occasional eccentric and unexpected but effective harmonizations". He admired the singing and playing of The Tolkien Ensemble, the Danish Radio Sinfonietta, and the Danish National Chamber Choir on the album; the conductor was Morten Ryelund Sørensen. Adele McAllister has recorded her own setting of the song.
