= Poetic device =

Form of literary device

A poetic device is a literary device used specifically in poetry or for poetic effect. Poems are created out of poetic devices via a composite of grammatical, rhythmic, structural, metrical, verbal, and visual elements. They are essential tools that a poet uses to create rhythm, enhance a poem's meaning, or intensify a mood or feeling.

== Poetic diction ==
Poetic Diction is a style of writing in poetry which encompasses vocabulary, phrasing, and grammatical usage. Along with syntax, poetic diction functions in the setting the tone, mood, and atmosphere of a poem to convey the poet's intention. Poetic devices shape a poem and its meanings.

=== Types of poetic dictions ===
==== Sound ====
Poetic devices that have a sonic quality achieve specific effects when heard. Words with a sound-like quality can strike readers as soothing or dissonant while evoking certain thoughts and feelings associated with them.

- Alliteration–Repeated consonant sounds at the beginning of words placed near each other, usually on the same or adjacent lines. Alliteration is used as a mnemonic device to evoke feelings such as fear and suspense in poetry.
- Assonance–Repeated vowel sounds in words placed near each other, usually on the same or adjacent lines. These vowel sounds are usually accented or stressed to give musical quality to the poem. By creating an internal rhyme, this also enhances the pleasure of reading the poem.
- Consonance–Repeated consonant sounds at the ending of words near each other, usually on the same or adjacent lines. These should be in sounds that are accented, or stressed, rather than in a vowel.
- Cacophony–A discordant series of harsh, unpleasant sounds to convey disorder. This is often enhanced by the combined effect of complex meanings and pronunciation. Example: My stick fingers click with a snicker And, chuckling, they knuckle the keys; Light-footed, my steel feelers flicker And pluck from these keys melodies. —“Player Piano,” John Updike.
- Euphony–A series of musically pleasant sounds that give the poem a melodious quality, conveying a sense of harmony to the reader.
- Onomatopoeia–It is used in poetry to create aural effects that mimic the visual image described. A combination of words may be used to create an onomatopoetic effect. It is, however, not imperative to use words that are onomatopoetic in and of themselves. For example, in Samuel Taylor Coleridge’s 'The Rime of the Ancient Mariner', Coleridge uses the phrase “furrow followed free” to mimic the sound of the wake left behind a ship.

==== Rhythm ====
Poetic rhythm is the flow of words within each meter and stanza to produce a rhythmic effect while emphasising specific parts of the poem.

- Repetition–Repetition often uses word associations to express ideas and emotions indirectly, emphasizing a point, confirming an idea, or describing a notion.
- Rhyme–Rhyme uses repeating patterns to bring out rhythm or musicality in poems. It is a repetition of similar sounds occurring in lines in a poem which gives the poem a symmetric quality.
- Caesura–A metrical pause or break in a verse where one phrase ends and another phrase begins.
- Enjambment–The continuation of a sentence without a pause beyond the end of a line, couplet, or stanza.

==== Meaning ====
The use of figurative language as a poetic device function to convey the poet's intended meaning in various ways.

- Allusion–A brief reference to a person, character, historical event, work of art, and Biblical or mythological situation.
- Analogy–Drawing a comparison or inference between two situations to convey the poet's message more effectively. Example: The plumbing took a maze of turns where even water got lost.
- Symbolism– means to imbue objects with a certain meaning that is different from their original meaning or function. It is a representative of other aspects, concepts or traits than those visible in literal translation. Other literary devices, such as metaphor, allegory, and allusion, aid in the development of symbolism.
- Oxymoron–A combination of two words that appear to contradict each other.
- Paradox–A statement in which a contradiction may reveal an unexpected truth.
- Personification–Attribution of a personal nature or human characteristics to something non-human, or the representation of an abstract quality in human form. Example: The days crept by slowly, sorrowfully.
- Pun–a joke exploiting the different possible meanings of a word or the fact that there are words which sound alike but have different meanings.

== Poetic form ==
Poetic form is the physical structure of the poem: the length of lines, rhythm, as well as system of rhymes and repetition. The poet's ideas and emotions are reinforced through this structural embodiment.

=== Types of poetic form ===
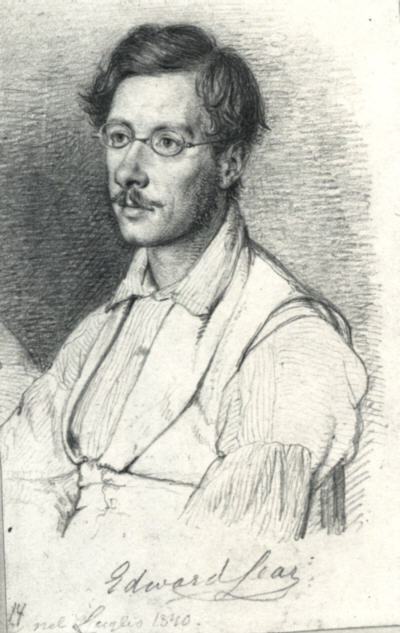
Edward Lear

==== Fixed verse ====
A poem which follows a set pattern of meter, rhyme scheme, stanza form, and refrain.

- Ballad–A narrative poem written in a series of quatrains in which lines of iambic tetrameter alternating with iambic trimeter. It typically adopts a xaxa, xbxb rhyme scheme with frequent use of repetition and refrain. Written in a straight-forward manner with graphic simplicity and force, ballads are lyrical and convey a wide range of subjects frequently associated with folklore or popular legends.
- Haiku–A Japanese form of poetry deeply influenced by Zen Buddhism. It consists of three non-rhymed lines of five, seven, and five syllables. The elusive nature of its form lies more in its touch and tone rather than in its syllabic structure. A haiku typically adopts a brief description of nature to convey implicit insights or essence of a moment. It is also common for haikus to embody a direct or oblique reference to a season.
- Limerick– Popularized by Edward Lear in his Book of Nonsense published in 1846, a limerick is considered the only fixed form of English origin. It is a light or humorous form of five chiefly anapestic verses with a rhyme scheme of aabba. Modern limericks generally use the final line for clever witticisms and wordplay while its content often tends toward the ribald and off-color.
- Lyric–Derived from the Greek word lyre, lyric poetry was originally designed to be sung. It is the most frequently used modern form, including all poems in which the speaker’s ardent expression of emotion predominates. Ranging from complex thoughts to simple wit, lyric poetry often evokes in the readers a recollection of similar emotional experiences.
- Ode–Several stanzaic forms that are more complex than that of the lyric. It is embedded with intricate rhyme schemes and an irregular number of lines of considerable length. Written with a rich and intense expression, an ode is structured to deliver an elevated thought to praise a person or object. “Ode to a Nightingale” is an example.
- Rondeau–A fixed form used in light or witty verses. It consists of fifteen octo- or decasyllabic lines with three stanzas and two rhymes applied throughout. A word or words from the initial segment of the first line are used as a refrain to end the second and third stanza to create a rhyme scheme.
- Villanelle–A poem consisting of two rhymes within five 3-line stanzas followed by a quatrain. The villanelle conveys a pleasant impression of simple spontaneity, as in Edwin Arlington Robinson’s 'The House on the Hill'.
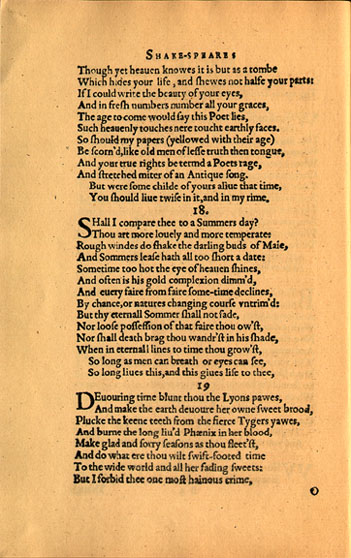
  Shakespeare Sonnet 18
- Sonnet–A fourteen-line poem in iambic pentameter with a prescribed rhyme scheme. Traditionally used to convey the idea of love. Shakespeare’s sonnet sequence, for example, seeks to discover new ways of imagining love. In Shakespeare’s sonnet 130, he describes the lady’s beauty skillfully and playfully such that every image of beauty it sets up is immediately refused to mock conventional Renaissance ideas of female beauty.

==== Blank verse ====
Also known as “un-rhymed iambic pentameter", blank verse is an unrhymed verse written in iambic pentameter. In poetry, it has a consistent meter with 10 syllables per line (pentameter). Unstressed syllables are followed by stressed syllables, five of which are stressed but do not rhyme.

- Trochee–A trochee is a two-syllable metrical pattern in poetry in which a stressed syllable is followed by an unstressed syllable.
- Iamb–A two-syllable metrical pattern in poetry in which one unstressed syllable is followed by a stressed syllable.
- Anapaest–A three-syllable metrical pattern in poetry in which two unstressed syllables are followed by a stressed syllable.
- Dactyl–A three-syllable metrical pattern in poetry in which a stressed syllable is followed by two unstressed syllables.
- Spondee–A beat in a poetic line that consists of two accented syllables. It is a poetic form that is less common than other metrical feet. It is rare to find poems written in spondee alone as poets use often use it in combination with other metrical feet.

==== Free verse ====
A poetic form free from limitations of regular metric rhythm and fixed rhyme schemes. The lack of regularity and conventional rhyme schemes allows the poet to shape the poem freely. Such irregularity and lack of refrain also evoke a sense of artistic expression. It may also be the case that the poet works by 'ear' or instinct, generating local hybrid forms that evolve in dialogue with the composition process.

Examples of free verse include 'A Noiseless Patient Spider' by Walt Whitman.

== Punctuation ==
Punctuations as poetic devices

Punctuation is an object of interpretation in poetry; it is semantic. In poetry, they act as non-verbal tools of poetic expression. A form of artistic choice, the poet's choice of punctuation is central to our understanding of poetic meaning because of its ability to influence prosody. The unorthodox use of punctuation increases the expressive complexity of poems, or may be used to align poetic metres. Unconventional use of punctuation is also employed to stress the meaning of words differently, or for dramatic effect. End-stopping is when a punctuation—of any kind—at the end of a line is accompanied by a strong pause. The occasional end-stopped line may evoke a sense of finale or formality while many end-stops in a row may be used to evoke a jerky cadence. On the contrary, a lack of punctuation allows the reader to interpret the sequence of words in various ways. A lack of punctuation may allow the poem to be interpreted as a "stream of consciousness" such as Maya Angelou’s I know why the caged bird sings.

- Question marks–In poetry, they are used to reflect a contemplative pause.
- Exclamation marks–Indicates surprise, joy, and other strong emotions the poet is trying to emphasise or convey.
- Ellipses–Leaving out part of a sentence or an event by substituting it with ellipses is a stylistic element. It represents an omission of words which helps in advancing the story.
- Parentheses–It is technically used to separate and subordinate segments of a prose sentence. In poetry, parentheses draws attention to what is encased within them. In Cummings’ poem, 'Somewhere i have never travelled, gladly beyond', parentheses are used to convey a sense of intimacy and contemplativeness: “… your slightest look easily will unclose me though i have closed myself as fingers, you open always petal by petal myself as Spring opens (touching skilfully, mysteriously) her first rose… (i do not know what it is about you that closes and opens; only something in me understands the voice of your eyes is deeper than all roses) nobody, not even the rain, has such small hands".
- Enjambment–A lack of punctuation. It creates run on lines where a thought, phrase, or clause in a line of poetry does not come to an end break, but moves on to the following line. It may be employed to reinforce a central idea by eradicating the use of semi-colons, periods, or commas which may distract the reader. Enjambment is also employed to achieve a fast pace or rhythm.
