= Haguna =

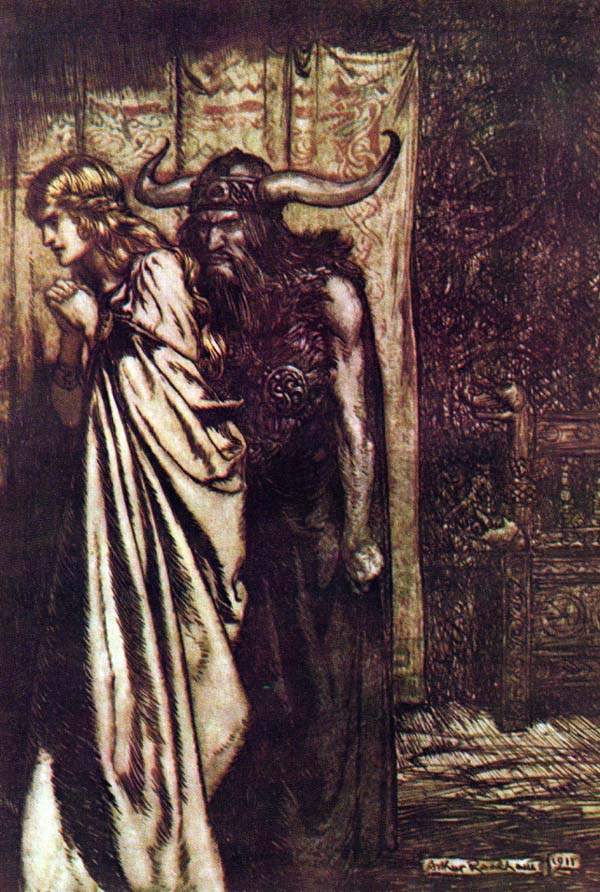
- Hagen, by Arthur Rackham.

Origin
- Origin: Germanic

Other names
- Related names: Hagano, Haguna, Hagena, Haghni, Hoghni, Haghne, Høghne, Hogne, Högni and Hǫgni, Høgni

Haguna or Hagana is a historical Germanic name. It is attested in the form Hagano in Old High German (8th century) and as Haguna and Hagena in Old English. Old West Norse has Hǫgni, presumably loaned from the character in German legend. Old Danish has Haghni and Hoghni; Old Swedish Haghne and Høghne.

The element Hagan- also occurs in dithematic names such as Chagnoald (7th century), Chagoulf (7th century), Haganrih (8th century). It is presumably an extension of the element Hag- which is attested in numerous variants from the 8th century. The etymology of this element cannot be recovered with certainty, especially as these names were conflated from an early time with names in Ag- and Agin-. A derivation from hag- "enclosure" is possible, but Förstemann also considered Old Norse hagr "favour, advantage".

Hagen is a character in the German Nibelungenlied, who was adopted in Old Norse sources as Hǫgni. Högne in the legends surrounding Helgi Hundingsbane in Völsunga saga and the Poetic Edda is believed to be the same person as the king of Östergötland who fought the Swedish king Ingjald in Ynglinga saga. Hǫgni of the Hjaðningavíg may be the same as Hagena in Widsith (line 21) since Widsith also pairs Hagena with Heoden (Heðinn).

== Sources and external links ==
- Peterson, Lena (2007). "Lexikon över urnordiska personnamn" (PDF). Swedish Institute for Language and Folklore. p. 26. Archived from the original (PDF) on 2011-05-18.(Lexicon of Nordic personal names before the 8th century)
- Sveriges medeltida personnamn, Uppsala, 1967ff, 2.581.
- E. Förstemann, Altdeutsches Namenbuch (1856; online facsimile, 3rd ed. 1900), 577-579.
