= Errantry =

Poem by J.R.R Tolkien

"Errantry" is a three-page poem by J.R.R. Tolkien, first published in The Oxford Magazine in 1933. It was included in revised and extended form in Tolkien's 1962 collection of short poems, The Adventures of Tom Bombadil. Donald Swann set the poem to music in his 1967 song cycle, The Road Goes Ever On.

The poem has a complex metre, invented by Tolkien. It fits the tune of Gilbert and Sullivan's patter song, "I Am the Very Model of a Modern Major-General". It shares metre and rhyming patterns with the "Song of Eärendil", a poem entirely different in tone. The scholar Paul H. Kocher calls the pair "obviously designed for contrast".

The Tolkien scholar Randel Helms calls it "a stunningly skillful piece of versification ... with smooth and lovely rhythms". Tolkien described it as "the most attractive" of his poems.

== Poem ==
=== Subject ===
Two quatrains

He battled with the Dumbledors,
the Hummerhorns, and Honeybees,
and won the Golden Honeycomb,
and running home on sunny seas,

in ship of leaves and gossamer,
with blossom for a canopy,
he sat and sang, and furbished up,
and burnished up his panoply.

--- End-of-lines with assonance and rhymes are shown in italics;
--- Line ends-and-starts with assonance are presented with underscores

The J. R. R. Tolkien Encyclopedia describes "Errantry" as "the nonsensical adventures of a tiny messenger knight who falls in love with a butterfly and battles various insects." It adds that it is then linked to the Hobbit Bilbo Baggins's "serious account of Eärendil's quest" as described in Tolkien's 1954–55 novel The Lord of the Rings.

The poem mentions creatures called Dumbledors and Hummerhorns. "Dumbledor" is an English dialect word for bumblebee, while according to the Tolkien scholars Christina Scull and Wayne G. Hammond, "Hummerhorn" is apparently a name invented by Tolkien for a large wasp or hornet.

=== Metre ===
Tolkien invented the metre, which consists of trisyllabic assonances, three in each set of four lines. The second and fourth line in every quatrain rhyme, as do the end of the first line and beginning of the second line in every pair. He found this so difficult that he never wrote another poem in this style, though he did later develop another style from this, and the result, through long evolution from Errantry, was Eärendil the Mariner, published in The Fellowship of the Ring. (Note: The History of Middle-earth, The Treason of Isengard, pp. 84–105)

Joe R. Christopher, in the J. R. R. Tolkien Encyclopedia, writes that the poem could be seen conventionally as quatrains of iambic tetrameters with ABCB rhyme, but that the recording of Tolkien reading the poem shows the metre to be his own invention. In Christopher's analysis, each line is composed of "two second-class paeons", each consisting of an iamb and a pyrrhus: ˘ − ˘ ˘. There is an additional rhyme or half-rhyme of the ends of the A or C lines with the first paeon of the B lines.

Catherine McIlwaine, director of an exhibition of Tolkien's works, called the poem "a new metrical experiment", noting that Tolkien read it to The Inklings, C. S. Lewis's literary group at Oxford.

== Middle-earth framework ==
For The Adventures of Tom Bombadil, Tolkien needed to find a way to incorporate the poem into the framework of The Lord of the Rings. The scholar Tom Shippey states that he achieved this "with great finesse" with the explanation that "Errantry" was an early work by the Hobbit Bilbo Baggins, composed soon after his return from the journey described in The Hobbit, so that he knew a little about Elves, but before he had moved to Rivendell where he actually studied Elvish languages properly. Accordingly, the work is sometimes classed as a Hobbit poem.

== Setting ==
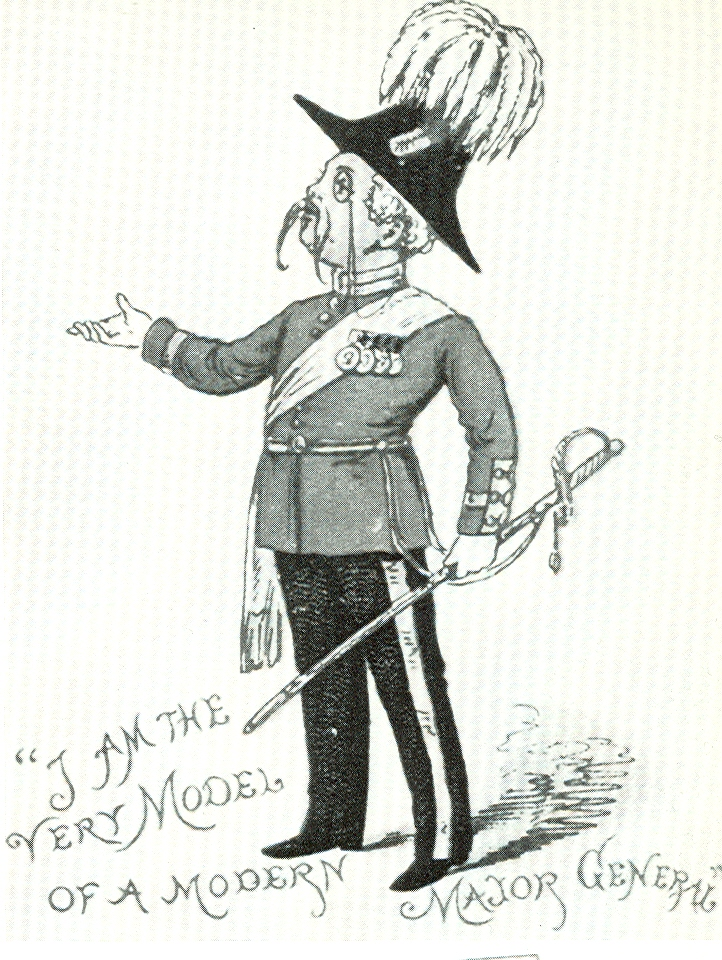
The poem was inspired by Gilbert and Sullivan's "Major-General's Song". 1884 illustration

The composer and entertainer Donald Swann set the poem to music. The sheet music and an audio recording are part of his 1967 song cycle, The Road Goes Ever On.

The J. R. R. Tolkien Encyclopedia states that the poem was "evidently" inspired by Gilbert and Sullivan's patter song "I Am the Very Model of a Modern Major-General", whose tune it fits, and further that Swann's musical setting is an obvious pastiche of Sullivan's style.

== Analysis ==
The scholar of English Randel Helms described "Errantry" as "a stunningly skillful piece of versification ... with smooth and lovely rhythms". The Scottish poet Alan Bold, who, Melanie Rawls notes, disliked almost all of Tolkien's verse, dismissed Helm's praise, writing that the poem "certainly displays all the sentimental silliness of the early Tolkien with its relentlessly contrived internal rhyming".

Shippey comments that the subject matter of tiny fairies was exactly what, later in his career, Tolkien came to abhor, emphasising instead the energy and strength of Elves and Dwarves. He suggests that Tolkien may have been especially proud of the poem's complex metre, and so chose to rework and extend the poem for the 1962 book. Tolkien indeed called it "the most attractive" of his poems in a 1952 letter to his publisher, Rayner Unwin, adding that

it is in a metre I invented (depending on trisyllabic assonances or near-assonances, which is so difficult that except in this one example I have never been able to use it again – it just blew out in a single impulse).

Paul H. Kocher writes that "Errantry" and the "Song of Eärendil" are "obviously designed for contrast", as if Tolkien had set himself the challenge of using the same theme of endless wandering, the same metrical forms and the same rhyming schemes, it would be possible to create both a tragedy and an "airy jest": "Looking at the passages picturing the armour of the two heroes we can see both the similarity in structure and the polarity in tone".

Kocher's comparison of "Eärendil" and "Errantry"
"Eärendil", a tragedy	"Errantry", an "airy jest"
In panoply of ancient kings, In chained rings he armoured him; His shining shield was scored with runes To ward all wounds and harm from him; His bow was made of dragon-horn, His arrows shorn of ebony, Of silver was his habergeon, His scabbard of chalcedony; His sword of steel was valiant, Of adamant his helmet tall, An eagle-plume upon his crest, Upon his breast an emerald.	He made a shield and morion of coral and of ivory, a sword he made of emerald,... Of crystal was his habergeon, His scabbard of chalcedony; with silver tipped at plenilune his spear was hewn in ebony. His javelins were of malachite and stalactite — he brandished them.
