= The Legend of Sigurd and Gudrún =

2009 norse-style legend by Tolkien

- The Legend of Sigurd and Gudrún first edition cover.
- Editor: Christopher Tolkien
- Author: J. R. R. Tolkien
- Illustrator: Bill Sanderson
- Cover artist: Bill Sanderson
- Language: English
- Subject: Norse mythology
- Genre: Fantasy
- Publisher: HarperCollins; Houghton Mifflin Harcourt
- Publication date: 5 May 2009
- Publication place: United Kingdom
- Media type: Print (hardback)
- Pages: 384 pp (first edition)
- ISBN: 978-0-00-731723-3
- OCLC: 310154475
- Preceded by: The Children of Húrin
- Followed by: The Fall of Arthur

The Legend of Sigurd and Gudrún is a book containing two narrative poems and related texts composed by English writer J. R. R. Tolkien. It was published by Houghton Mifflin Harcourt and HarperCollins on 5 May 2009.

The two poems that make up most of the book were probably written during the 1930s, and were inspired by the legend of Sigurd and the fall of the Niflungs in Norse mythology. Both poems are in a form of alliterative verse inspired by the traditional verse of the Poetic Edda, compiled in the 13th century. Christopher Tolkien has added copious notes and commentary on his father's work.

== Plot ==
=== The New Lay of the Völsungs ===
==== Upphaf ====
Asgard is besieged by jötunns and trolls. Wielding the hammer Mjöllnir, Thor repels the enemies. A seeress prophesies Ragnarök, where Odin will be slain by the wolf Fenrir and Thor by the Midgard serpent, unless a mortal descendant of Odin, a serpent-slayer, fights alongside the gods. In vain, Odin scatters his seed among mortals.

==== Andvari's gold ====
Odin, Loki, and Hoenir arrive at the dwarf Andvari's cave. Meeting the demon Hreidmar's son Ótr whom they mistake for an otter, Loki kills and skins him, and steals his salmon. Enraged, Hreidmar and his sons, Fafnir and Regin, bind the three gods in unbreakable chains and demand that Otr's pelt be covered with gold in compensation. Loki seeks out Andvari and extorts the gold ransom. Andvari attempts to conceal a golden ring, but Loki seizes it as well. Enraged, Andvari vows that the ring and the gold will be the death of all who possess them. Loki delivers the gold to Hreidmar and his sons.

==== Signý ====
Rerir the sea lord, Odin's grandson, conducts raids in Viking longships. His son Völsung, Odin's favourite, marries a valkyrie, who has twins, Sigmund and Signý. Siggeir, King of the Gauts, demands Signý's hand in marriage. At the wedding feast, Odin enters the hall disguised as Grímnir. He drives a sword into the oak at the center of the hall and dares the men present to pull it out. Only Sigmund succeeds; he refuses the fortune Siggeir offers in exchange for it. Enraged, Siggeir declares war on Völsung and kills him and his men. Only Signý's ten brothers are captured. The brothers are imprisoned in stocks, and each night one is eaten by a she-wolf. Sigmund, the last survivor, slays the she-wolf (with Signý's secret help) and escapes to an enchanted cave, where he sleeps with an elvish maiden, not realizing she is his sister in disguise. Their son is Sinfjötli. When he comes of age, he visits his father in the cave and delivers the sword of Grímnir. Father and son range through Gautland as outlaws. They infiltrate the hall of Siggeir and kill everyone; they ask Signý to leave with them, but she refuses and dies at her husband's side.

==== The Death of Sinfjötli ====
Sigmund and Sinfjötli return by ship to the land of the Völsungs. Sigmund takes a queen from among the war captives. Loathing the man who slew her father, the Queen brews poison for Sinfjötli. Sigmund, suspecting that his wine has been tampered with, drains Sinfjötli's and remains unharmed. Enraged, the Queen brews poisoned beer, which again is offered to Sinfjötli but drunk by his father with no harm. Still determined to slay Sinfjötli, the Queen gives him poisoned ale. This time the cup is drunk by Sinfjötli himself, who falls dead. Sinfjötli is welcomed in Valhalla by his grandfather Völsung, who comments that the serpent slayer is still awaited.

==== Sigurd born ====
Sigmund grows old, having lost both his son and his treacherous Queen. He marries the beauteous Princess Sigrlinn. Enraged at this slight, the seven rejected sons of kings invade the land. Sigmund is confronted by a one-eyed warrior, and is severely wounded. Sigrlinn vows to heal his wounds, but Sigmund refuses. He prophesies that her unborn child will be the serpent-slayer, and orders her to carefully preserve the fragments of Grímnir's gift. He dies and Sigrlinn is carried into slavery. When the parentage of her son is revealed, Sigrlinn is wed to the king of that land. Sigurd is sent to be fostered by Regin, son of Hreidmar.

==== Regin ====
Otr's ransom is held by Regin's brother Fafnir, transformed into a dragon. Coveting the hoard, Regin goads Sigurd into fighting Fafnir. Twice Regin tries to forge a sword for Sigurd, only to see him effortlessly break them. At last, Sigurd asks his mother Sigrlinn for the shards of the sword Grímnir. Regin forges them into the sword Gram. Sigurd buys the horse Grani, sired by Odin's eight-legged steed Sleipnir, and goes forth to kill Fafnir. Sigurd hides and stabs the dragon in the heart. As Fafnir's black blood drains over Sigurd and hardens his flesh, the young warrior withdraws his sword and leaps into the dragon's sight. As the dragon dies, Regin attempts to claim some of the gold. Regin draws a knife and cuts out Fafnir's heart. Ordering Sigurd to roast it for him, Regin departs. Sigurd fashions a spit and kindles a fire. After burning his finger on the roasting heart, Sigurd puts the finger in his mouth and suddenly understands the language of birds. As he listens to the birds speaking, Sigurd decides to eat the heart whole. Upon seeing Regin sneaking towards him with a drawn blade, Sigurd draws Gram and slays his foster father. He loads the gold hoard onto Grani and departs.

==== Brynhildr ====
Sigurd arrives at Hindarfell. As they climb the mountainside, Grani leaps the ring of lightning and fire which surrounds the valkyrie Brynhild. Sigurd slices her corslet with Gram, awakening her. Brynhild explains how Odin doomed her to mate a mortal man. Brynhild had vowed to wed only the prophesied serpent-slayer. When Sigurd relates his descent from Odin and the slaying of Fafnir, Brynhild says that the gods await him in Valhalla. They become engaged, but she vows that she will only wed Sigurd when he has won a kingdom. After cautioning him to avoid the abode of a witch-hearted woman, she returns to Hindarfell. Sigurd rides to the court of the Niflungs' at Worms.

==== Gudrun ====
Princess Gudrun of the Niflungs approaches her mother, the witch-hearted Queen Grimhild, with a dream. The Niflungs were hunting a stag which evaded their grasp. Gudrun caught him, only to see him stung with a shaft by a spiteful woman. Her mother then gave Gudrun a wolf to ease her grief and bathed her in the blood of her brothers. Gudrun sees a warrior riding toward the court. Sigurd enters the court, riding upon Grani. When her father Gjuki asks his name and parentage, he is overjoyed to learn that a Völsung warrior has arrived and summons a seat for Sigurd. Gudrun's brother Gunnar sings a lay of the Niflungs' war against King Atli of the Huns. Sigurd takes the harp and sings of Brynhild and the gold hoard. Impressed, Gunnar and Högni invite Sigurd to dwell among them. Sigurd accompanies the Niflungs in war, and their glory spreads far and wide. Grimhild advises her sons to regularise their alliance with Sigurd by marrying him to Gudrun. Grimhild gives Sigurd a love potion, and he falls in love with Gudrun.

==== Brynhild betrayed ====
Brynhild awaits the coming of Sigurd, slaying the visiting suitors. Odin arrives on horseback, armoured as an ancient king. He prophesies that she shall wed a mortal king. Sigurd weds Gudrun. He and his in-laws swear eternal brotherhood, but a shadow remains in Sigurd's heart. The news of Brynhild and the gold hoard reaches Grimhild's ears. Certain that such a Queen will bring glory to her son's court, Grimhild counsels King Gunnar to wed. Sigurd, Högni, and Gunnar depart for Brynhild's mead hall. King Gunnar's horse shies away at the sight of the fire at the mead hall. Through a spell cast by Grimhild, Sigurd rides through the fire in Gunnar's likeness. Brynhild demands to know whether "Gunnar" is the masterless warrior she has vowed to wed. "Gunnar" reminds her that, as her oath has been fulfilled, she is doomed to wed him. That night, Brynhild and Sigurd sleep in the same bed with a drawn sword lying between them. As dawn arrives, Brynhild at last agrees to marry "Gunnar."

==== Strife ====
During the nuptial feast, the bride catches sight of Sigurd next to Gudrun. Grimhild's spell dissipates and Sigurd recalls the oaths he swore to Brynhild. Later, during a stag hunt, Brynhild and Gudrun bathe in the Rhine. Brynhild comments that the water washing Gudrun will soon wash one far lovelier. Gudrun reveals that Sigurd rode through the fire and shows the ring of Brynhild on her own hand. Shocked, Brynhild returns to her bower, where she curses the Norns for framing her fate.

Brynhild refuses to eat, drink, or depart her bed. When Gunnar approaches her, she calls him a coward and curses him to an early death. Stunned, Sigurd speaks lovingly to her of the spell that was cast upon him and admits that his only comfort has been to see her in Gunnar's hall. Although touched, Brynhild states that it is too late to avert the evil of her curse, but Sigurd shall die an honourable death at the point of a sword.

Sigurd tells Gudrun of the curse. When Gunnar later seeks his advice, Sigurd informs him that Brynhild's only doctor should be her husband. In response, Gunnar approaches his wife, offering her a hoard of gold and silver. Unmoved, Brynhild taunts him as "a Völsung's squire, a vassal's servant." She adds that she will depart his mead hall and leave Gunnar in disgrace unless he slays his brother in law. Gunnar declares to Högni that Sigurd has broken the oath and must be slain. Högni suggests that Brynhild is lying out of jealousy. Gunnar insists, however, that he loves and trusts Brynhild more than anyone in the world and adds that, by slaying Sigurd, they will be masters again of their kingdom. Högni declares that the Niflungs will miss both Sigurd's prowess in war and the mighty nephews he could have sired. Knowing that he swore no oath, Gunnar approaches his half brother Gotthorm and promises him both gold and lordship if he kills Sigurd.

Later, as Sigurd hunts with his falcon, Gutthorm accuses him of wishing to usurp the Niflung throne. Sigurd orders Gutthorm to say no more if he values his life. At dawn the following morning, Gutthorm enters Sigurd's room with a drawn sword and stabs him. Awakening, Sigurd kills his attacker; he dies in Gudrun's arms.

As Gudrun laments, Brynhild laughs, curses the Niflungs for murdering their blood brother, and reveals that Sigurd's seduction was a lie. Brynhild announces that she is leaving Gunnar forever, and falls upon her sword. She requests that her corpse be burned in Sigurd's funeral pyre. Gram is to lie unsheathed between them as on their only night together. Sigurd and Brynhild are carried to Valhalla in the flames of a Viking funeral.

Odin and the Völsungs welcome the long-awaited serpent slayer. At Ragnarök, Brynhild will attire Sigurd for war and he will defeat the wolf Fenrir and the Midgard serpent. Most of the Aesir shall die, but Sigurd will destroy the forces of darkness, and the nine worlds will be created anew.

=== The New Lay of Gudrun ===
As the flames of the pyre sink, Gudrun wanders through the forest witless. King Atli's Hunnic Empire grows ever stronger, and he hastens westward to claim the gold hoard of Fafnir and the beauty of Gudrun.

As the news reaches the Niflung court, Gunnar asks Högni whether Atli should be fought or appeased. Högni advises Gunnar to fight, but Grimhild counsels offering Gudrun's hand in marriage, and the Niflungs decide to do this. They offer Gudrun a large payment of gold as weregild for her husband's death, but she refuses. Grimhild threatens to curse her daughter to unimaginable torment if she will not obey. Intimidated, Gudrun agrees. At their wedding feast, Atli drinks to Gudrun, moved both by her beauty and by dreams of the dragon hoard. He takes Gudrun back to Hunland, but his lust for the dragon hoard remains unquenched and he summons the Niflungs to a feast in Hunland. Högni suspects a trap.

Gudrun sends Gunnar a wooden slab with "runes of healing". Grimhild says the original runes have been shaven off the tablet but may still be read. The original message from Gudrun was a warning of danger. Gunnar says he will not be coming to the feast in Hunland. Amused, Vingi responds that, as Grimhild clearly rules the Niflung kingdom, there is no need for Gunnar to come. Although Gunnar suspects a trap, he agrees to come to the feast. Högni is troubled that they aren't taking their mother's counsel. Vingi dishonestly swears that the gallows shall take him and ravens shall devour his flesh if the runes are lying. Grimhild watches as they disappear, certain she will never see them again.

The Niflungs arrive in Hunland and sound their horns; but the gates are barred. Vingi reveals the reason for the invitation: Atli has prepared a gallows for the Niflungs. Högni vows that the treacherous Vingi has forfeited his life. Dragging him to a nearby oak, the Niflungs hang Vingi in sight of the Huns. The Huns hurl themselves upon the Niflungs. Gunnar and Högni drive the Huns back inside the mead hall. Atli calls the Niflungs his vassals, and demands Fafnir's gold hoard as the price of their lives. Gunnar refuses. Atli demands weregild for Sigurd. Doors spring open and Hun warriors charge the Niflungs, who fill the mead hall with bodies.

Gudrun listens to the battle and curses the hour of her birth. Recalling their past wars against Atli and his Huns, the Goths turn against their lord and make common cause with the Niflungs. Gunnar and Högni fight their way to Gudrun, and declare that the Norns have fated them to always give her in marriage and then slay her husband. Gudrun pleads with them not to tempt fate and to spare Atli's life. They mock Atli as unfit for a warrior's death and allow him to slink away. Night falls as Atli rallies warriors throughout the countryside. As the Goths and Niflungs go to sleep, Högni notices a column of fire moving toward the mead hall. Gunnar rallies his men for the final battle, and they defend the doorways for five days. Atli bewails the loss of all that he has. His counselor Beiti tells Atli to set fire to the mead hall; as it collapses, the Goths and Niflungs charge out and are captured.

Casting his captives before Gudrun, Atli vows that he will avenge Sigurd by hurling her brothers into a pit of adders. Disgusted, Gudrun calls her husband evil and expresses hope that his death will be shameful. Atli vows that he will release the Niflungs only if he is given the gold hoard. Gunnar agrees to give Atli the gold, but only if his brother Högni is first slain and the heart is delivered to him. Now frantic, Gudrun pleads with Atli to spare her brother Högni. Atli, however, vows that he will have the gold despite the tears of his wife.

Atli's wise men, however, plead for caution. Fearing the queen, they persuade Atli to slay the thrall Hjalli; but Gunnar is not fooled. The Huns cut out Högni's heart, but Gunnar laughs in their faces: the gold, he declares, is long gone, having been cast into the Rhine after Sigurd's death. Gunnar curses Atli, calling him a gold-haunted murderer. Atli orders Gunnar to be stripped naked and cast into the pit of adders. Gudrun orders a harp to be sent to her brother in the pit. Gunnar chants of Odin and the Aesir, of ancient kings, and the coming doom of Hunland, to the sound of the harp. The whole palace listens in wonder and the snakes are stilled to sleep. An ancient adder bites Gunnar in the chest; he topples over dead and the harp is stilled. Gudrun hears his cry. Realising how to avenge her brothers, Gudrun summons her sons Erp and Eitil.

Viking funerals are prepared, and a funeral feast is held in the remnants of Atli's palace. Gudrun, presenting two goblets to her husband, toasts his health. He drinks. She tells him that, in vengeance for her brothers, she has slain their sons; the goblets, made from their skulls, were filled with their blood and honey. Their bodies have been fed to Atli's hounds. Atli swoons. As the moon rises, Atli is carried to his bed, as sick as one poisoned. Gudrun enters his chambers, wakes her husband, and drives a knife into Atli's breast. Laughing, she tells him that his funeral pyre has already been kindled; fire consumes Atli's palace and the surrounding town. Gudrun drowns herself in the sea.

== Origin ==
According to Christopher Tolkien, it is no longer possible to trace the exact date of composition of the two poems in The Legend of Sigurd and Gudrun, though circumstantial evidence suggests that they date from the 1930s. In his foreword, Christopher Tolkien writes:

"He scarcely ever (to my knowledge) referred to them. For my part, I cannot recall any conversation with him on the subject until very near the end of his life, when he spoke of them to me, and tried unsuccessfully to find them."

Tolkien wrote in 1967, in a letter to W. H. Auden:

"Thank you for your wonderful effort in translating and reorganizing The Song of the Sibyl. In return, I hope to send you, if I can lay my hands on it (I hope it isn't lost), a thing I did many years ago while trying to learn the art of writing alliterative poetry: an attempt to unify the lays about the Völsungs from the Elder Edda, written in the old eight-line fornyrðislag stanza."

== Commentary ==
In a prefatory text, "Introduction to the Elder Edda", based partly on one of his lectures, Tolkien draws a sharp distinction between epic poems and the Skaldic and eddic poems of the Nordic countries: "...epic poetry never developed in those lands"; "verse developed its local brief, pithy, strophic, often dramatic form, not into epic, but into the astonishing and euphonious but formal elaborations of scaldic verse." He also draws a distinction, although not as sharply, between the later elaborate skaldic verse and the simpler forms used in the poems of the Elder Edda. The poems in The Legend of Sigurd and Gudrún use these simpler forms, which, the book says, arose earlier but persisted alongside the skaldic forms. "But the opposition between 'Eddic' and 'Skaldic' verse is quite unreal as one of 'time.' ... They are related growths, branches on the same tree, essentially connected, even possibly sometimes by the same hands." Tolkien also mentions that the use of the term "eddic" for this simpler style of verse is a later development, even an anachronism: "Thus the term 'Eddaic', as now used, in opposition to 'Skaldic,' is a perfect reversal of its former meaning."

The book contains extensive commentary by Christopher Tolkien on the sources for the two poems by his father, and the ways in which he used, mixed, and differed from those sources, as well as the larger background of legend and history behind the stories. Excerpts from notes for lectures that J. R. R. Tolkien gave on related topics are also included.

== Audiobook ==
The Scottish actor Brian Cox collaborated with HarperCollins to produce a dramatic reading of The Legend of Sigurd and Gudrún, released in August 2009.

== See also ==
- The Story of Sigurd the Volsung and the Fall of the Niblungs (William Morris, 1876)

== Bibliography ==
- Tolkien, J. R. R.; Tolkien, Christopher (2009). The legend of Sigurd and Gudrún. Boston: Houghton Mifflin Harcourt. ISBN 978-0-547-27342-6. OCLC 310224953.
