= Paul H. Kocher =

American scholar of literature

Paul H. Kocher as a Guggenheim Fellow

Paul Harold Kocher (April 23, 1907 – July 17, 1998) was an American scholar, writer, and professor of English. He wrote extensively on the works of J. R. R. Tolkien as well as on Elizabethan English drama, philosophy, religion, and medicine. His numerous publications include studies of Christopher Marlowe and Francis Bacon. He also authored books on the Franciscan missions of 18th- and 19th-century California.

== Biography ==
Born Paul Harold Kocher in Trinidad, to German parents, he moved to New York City in 1919, later becoming a United States citizen. He attended Columbia University when very young, then pursued graduate study of law and literature at Stanford. After earning his doctorate, he taught in the United States and in England, retiring from the faculty of Stanford University in 1970. He was a recipient of fellowships from the Huntington Library, the Folger Shakespeare Library, and twice, in 1946 and 1955, from the Guggenheim Foundation.

In 1973 Kocher won the Mythopoeic Society's Scholarship in Inkling Studies Award for his book on J. R. R. Tolkien, Master of Middle-Earth. The book was published before The Silmarillion appeared (1977) to resolve several of the questions to which Kocher guesses the answer, usually correctly.

== Books ==
- Alabado: A Story of Old California. Chicago: Franciscan Herald Press, 1978.
- California's Old Missions: The Story of the 21 Franciscan Missions in Alta California, 1769-1823. Chicago: Franciscan Herald Press, 1976.
- Christopher Marlowe: A Study of His Thought, Learning and Character. Chapel Hill: University of North Carolina Press, 1946. Reprinted, New York: Russell & Russell, 1962.
- Master of Middle-Earth: The Fiction of J. R. R. Tolkien. Boston: Houghton Mifflin, 1972.
- Mission San Luis Obispo de Tolosa, 1772–1972: A Historical Sketch. San Luis Obispo, California: Blake, 1972.
- A Reader's Guide to The Silmarillion. Boston: Houghton Mifflin, 1980.
- Science and Religion in Elizabethan England. San Marino, California: Huntington Library, 1953.
- (edited) The Tragical History of Doctor Faustus, by Christopher Marlowe. New York: Appleton-Century-Crofts, 1950.

== Articles ==
- "Adult Themes in a Tale To Be Read to Children." Readings on J.R.R. Tolkien, ed. Katie De Koster. San Diego, CA: Greenhaven Press, 2000.
- "Backgrounds for Marlowe's Atheist Lecture." Philological Quarterly 20.3 (July 1941): 304–324.
- "Christopher Marlowe, Individualist." University of Toronto Quarterly 17 (Jan. 1948): 110–120.
- "The Druedain." Mythlore: A Journal of J. R. R. Tolkien, C. S. Lewis, Charles Williams, and the Genres of Myth and Fantasy Studies 10.3 (Winter 1984): 23–25.
- "The Early Date for Marlowe's Faustus." Modern Language Notes 58.7 (Nov. 1943): 539–542.
- "The English Faust Book and the Date of Marlowe's Faustus." Modern Language Notes 55.2 (Feb. 1940): 95–101.
- "English Legal History in Marlowe's Jew of Malta." Huntington Library Quarterly: A Journal for the History and Interpretation of English and American Civilization 26 (1963): 155–163.
- "Francis Bacon and His Father." The Huntington Library Quarterly 21.2 (Feb. 1958): 133–158.
- "Francis Bacon on the Drama", in Essays on Shakespeare and the Elizabethan Drama in Honor of Hardin Craig, ed. Richard Hosley. Columbia: University of Missouri Press, 1962. pp. 297–307.
- "Francis Bacon on the Science of Jurisprudence." Journal of the History of Ideas 18.1 (Jan. 1957): 3–26.
- "François Hotman and Marlowe's The Massacre at Paris." PMLA: Publications of the Modern Language Association of America 56.2 (June 1941): 349–368.
- "J. R. R. Tolkien and George MacDonald." Mythlore: A Journal of J. R. R. Tolkien, C. S. Lewis, Charles Williams, and the Genres of Myth and Fantasy Studies 8.3 (Autumn 1981): 3–4.
- "Humor in Tamburlaine", in Shakespeare's Contemporaries: Modern Studies in English Renaissance Drama, ed. Max Bluestone and Norman Rabkin. Englewood Cliffs, N.J., Prentice-Hall, 1970.
- "The Idea of God in Elizabethan Medicine." Journal of the History of Ideas 11.1 (Jan. 1950): 3–29.
- "Lady Macbeth and the Doctor." Shakespeare Quarterly 5.4 (Fall 1954): 341–349.
- "Marlowe's Art of War." Studies in Philology 39.2 (April 1942): 207–225.
- "Marlowe's Atheist Lecture." The Journal of English and Germanic Philology 39 (Jan. 1940): 98–106. Reprinted in Marlowe: A Collection of Critical Essays, ed. Clifford Leech. Englewood Cliffs, N.J.: Prentice-Hall, 1964.
- "Middle-Earth: An Imaginary World?" in Understanding The Lord of the Rings: The Best of Tolkien Criticism, ed. Rose A Zimbardo and Neil David Isaacs. Boston: Houghton Mifflin, 2004.
- "A Mythology for England." in J.R.R. Tolkien, ed. Harold Bloom. Philadelphia: Chelsea House, 2000.
- "The Old Cosmos: A Study in Elizabethan Science and Religion." The Huntington Library Quarterly 15.2 (Feb. 1952): 101–121.
- "Paracelsan Medicine in England: The First Thirty Years (ca. 1570–1600)." Journal of the History of Medicine and Allied Sciences 7.4 (1947): 451–480.
- "The Physician as Atheist in Elizabethan England." The Huntington Library Quarterly 10.3 (May 1947): 229–249.
- "Sauron et la nature du mal." QUESTION DE 42 (May 1981).
- "Some Nashe Marginalia Concerning Marlowe." Modern Language Notes 57.2 (Jan. 1942): 45–49.
- "Use of the Bible in English Astronomical Treatises During the Renaissance." The Huntington Library Quarterly 9.2 (Feb. 1946): 109–120.
- "The Witchcraft Basis in Marlowe's Faustus." Modern Philology: A Journal Devoted to Research in Medieval and Modern Literature 38.1 (1940): 9–36.
