= The Fall of Arthur =

Unfinished poem by J. R. R. Tolkien

- Editor: Christopher Tolkien
- Author: J. R. R. Tolkien
- Illustrator: Bill Sanderson
- Cover artist: Bill Sanderson
- Language: English
- Subject: Arthurian legend Literary criticism
- Genre: Alliterative verse epic
- Publisher: HarperCollins; Houghton Mifflin Harcourt
- Publication date: 21 May 2013
- Publication place: United Kingdom
- Media type: Print (hardback); Kindle ebook
- Pages: 240
- ISBN: 978-0-544-11589-7 (hardback); 978-0-007-48989-3 (deluxe edition)
- Preceded by: The Legend of Sigurd and Gudrún
- Followed by: Beowulf: A Translation and Commentary

The Fall of Arthur is an unfinished poem by J. R. R. Tolkien on the legend of King Arthur. A posthumous first edition of the poem was published by HarperCollins in 2013.

== Poem ==
=== Composition history ===
Tolkien wrote the poem during the earlier part of the 1930s, when he was Rawlinson and Bosworth Professor of Anglo-Saxon at Pembroke College, Oxford. He abandoned it at some point after 1934, most likely in 1937 when he was occupied with preparing The Hobbit for publication. Its composition thus dates to shortly after his The Lay of Aotrou and Itroun (1930), a poem of 508 lines modelled on the Breton lay genre.

The poem had been abandoned for nearly 20 years in 1955, and The Lord of the Rings had been published, when Tolkien expressed his wish to return to and complete his "long poem". (Note: Carpenter 2023, letter 165 to Houghton Mifflin, June 1955) But it remained unfinished, nonetheless.

=== Approach ===
The Fall of Arthur is written in alliterative verse, its five cantos extending to nearly 1,000 lines which imitate Old English poetry's metre, as used in poems such as Beowulf; it is in Modern English inspired by high medieval Arthurian fiction. The historical setting of the poem is early medieval, both in form (using Germanic verse) and in content, showing Arthur as a Migration period British military leader fighting the Saxon invasion. At the same time, it avoids most of the high medieval aspects of the Arthurian cycle, such as the Grail and the courtly setting. The poem begins with a British "counter-invasion" to the Saxon lands (Arthur eastward in arms purposed). The Tolkien scholar Verlyn Flieger notes that while some find it ironic that Tolkien should have written about a "Celtic" (British) hero in the style of Old English, in alliterative verse, and in the language of the enemy of the enemy, some 700 years had provided ample time for Arthur "to be assimilated into the English cultural imagination".

=== Plot ===
The existing fragment of the poem tells that King Arthur comes home from a war to suppress a rebellion in his kingdom. He finds that things have changed in his absence. His queen, Guinever, has had an affair with the knight, Lancelot: she has renounced him; he remains loyal to Arthur. Their affair has, the reader learns in flashback, helped to break up Arthur's loyal Round Table fellowship of knights. Another knight, Mordred, is full of unsatisfied passion for Guinever, and hopes to become King. The poem hints that Arthur's ambitious pride has fated him to fall, "a last assay / of pride and prowess, to the proof setting / will unyielding in war with fate."(I, ll. 15–17)

=== Publication history ===
The existence of the poem became known publicly with Humphrey Carpenter's 1977 biography of Tolkien.

After Tolkien's death, his Arthurian poem came to be one of his longest-awaited unedited works. According to the Tolkien scholar John D. Rateliff, Rayner Unwin had announced plans to edit the poem as early as 1985, but the edition was postponed in favour of "more pressing projects" (including The History of Middle-earth, edited and brought to publication between 1983 and 1996), answering the demand for background on Tolkien's legendarium more than his literary production in other areas.

The book The Fall of Arthur, containing the part of the poem completed by Tolkien, and essays on the poem by his son Christopher Tolkien, was published in the United Kingdom by HarperCollins, and in the United States by Houghton Mifflin Harcourt.

== Reception ==
=== General ===
Carpenter noted that the poem "has alliteration but no rhyme. [...] In his own Arthurian poem [Tolkien] did not touch on the Grail but began an individual rendering of the Morte d'Arthur, in which the king and Gawain go to war in 'Saxon lands' but are summoned home by news of Mordred's treachery. The poem was never finished, but it was read and approved by E. V. Gordon, and by R. W. Chambers, Professor of English at London University, who considered it to be 'great stuff – really heroic, quite apart from its value as showing how the Beowulf metre can be used in modern English'." Carpenter cited a passage from the poem, to make the point that it is a rare instance in Tolkien's writings where sexual desire is given explicit literary treatment, in this case Mordred's "unsated passion" for Guinever:

His bed was barren there black phantoms
of desire unsated and savage fury
in his brain had brooded till bleak morning

Hilary Dorsch Wong, reviewing the work for the Washington Independent Review of Books, describes the poem as "accessible, with a driving plot and engaging use of language." She finds the principal characters "strongly fleshed-out"; in her view the poem's core consists of the interaction between the "lust-driven" Mordred and Guinever, along with the "backstory" of the deeply conflicted Lancelot's history with Guinever. In her view, the poem offers "wonderful storytelling".

On the other hand, Wong doubts whether Christopher Tolkien's detailed but dry chapters, which take up twice as much space as the poem itself, will appeal to many readers. She notes, for example, that while he shows which details his father took from each of the different medieval versions of the story, he "fails to draw conclusions from this information, or to make wider arguments about Tolkien's poem from it." Similarly, his study of how the poem might have been finished includes some rather "tenuous" tracing of story elements to Middle-earth stories such as the voyage of Eärendil and the Fall of Númenor, which she presumes was aimed at Tolkien fans. Wong states that even though she considers herself a Tolkien fan, she found the chapter's lack of conclusions disappointing. She similarly found the last chapter on the poem's evolution dull, with lengthy quotations illustrating the most minor of textual differences between drafts, but "few useful conclusions".

=== Scholarly ===
Flieger, in Tolkien Studies, writes that Tolkien's Arthur differs markedly from Malory's, Tennyson's, or his contemporary T. H. White's; in her view, his Arthur is "at once older and sterner, less idealized, and decidedly less romantic", but true to Tolkien's own era.

Verlyn Flieger's comparison of Tolkien's poem with other versions
Chrétien de Troyes e.g. Lancelot, Perceval 12th century	Malory Le Morte d'Arthur 15th century	Tennyson Idylls of the King 19th century	T. H. White The Once and Future King 20th century	Tolkien The Fall of Arthur 20th century
"colorful world of chivalry and courtly love"	"fully fleshed-out story of human intentions gone disastrously wrong"	"sermon on 'sense at war with soul', a flawed Round Table and an ideal king"	"bittersweet riff on war and human nature"	"a somber story whose overriding image is the tide, embodying the ebb and flow of events"

She comments that missing from the poem are all the bright images of Camelot, the tournaments, the knightly games of chivalric love. Missing, too, are the magical elements, the wizard Merlin, the enchantress Morgan le Fay, the Holy Grail, the spiritual quest, the dream, the triumphant return home. Instead, Tolkien chooses tragedy; Flieger comments that the theme of "loss and doom" held a special attraction for him, as seen in his poem of The Legend of Sigurd and Gudrún, or in the repeated attention he gave to the tragic tale of Túrin Turambar.

== See also ==
- The Legend of Sigurd and Gudrún
- Tolkien and the Celtic

== Sources ==
- Carpenter, Humphrey (1977). J. R. R. Tolkien: A Biography. New York: Ballantine Books. ISBN 978-0-04-928037-3.
- Carpenter, Humphrey, ed. (2023) [1981]. The Letters of J. R. R. Tolkien: Revised and Expanded Edition. New York: HarperCollins. ISBN 978-0-35-865298-4.
