= Leaving Rivendell =

Studio album by The Tolkien Ensemble
- Released: 2005
- Recorded: Germany
- Genre: Classical
- Length: 69:00

The Tolkien Ensemble chronology
At Dawn in Rivendell (2003)	Leaving Rivendell (2005)	Complete Songs & Poems (2006)

Leaving Rivendell is the fourth album by the Danish group The Tolkien Ensemble, with Christopher Lee as additional vocalist. It features songs composed to the lyrics found in The Lord of the Rings by J. R. R. Tolkien and forms the end part of a complete musical interpretation of all lyrics in the book.

The composer Stephen Eddins describes the music as "largely modal and melancholy". In his view the album has the correct tone for accompanying Tolkien's poems, but the music is not in the main "strong enough" to attract listeners who are not already Tolkien fans. He prefers Peter Hall's settings to those by Caspar Reiff, and considers Hall's "Song of Eärendil" to be the most successful track in the album. That setting is played on guitar by Hall and sung by the Scottish musician Nick Keir, and to Eddins it "sounds authentically rooted in Celtic folk music, with occasional eccentric and unexpected but effective harmonizations". He admired the singing and playing of The Tolkien Ensemble, the Danish Radio Sinfonietta, and the Danish National Chamber Choir on the album; the conductor was Morten Ryelund Sørensen.

== Track listing ==
1. "Riddle of Strider (II)" (Caspar Reiff)
2. "Verse of the Rings (II)" (Caspar Reiff)
3. "Bregalad's Song" (Caspar Reiff)
4. "Legolas' Song of the Sea" (Caspar Reiff)
5. "Song of the Elves Beyond the Sea - Galadriel's Song of Eldamar (II)" (Caspar Reiff)
6. "Oliphaunt" (Peter Hall)
7. "Ents' Marching Song" (Peter Hall)
8. "Galadriel's Messages" (Caspar Reiff)
9. "Song of Eärendil" (Peter Hall)
10. "Song of Durin" (Peter Hall)
11. "Tom Bombadil's Song (III) I Had an Errand There..." (Peter Hall)
12. "Wight's Chant" (Peter Hall)
13. "Ho! Tom Bombadil (II)" (Peter Hall)
14. "Tom Bombadil's Song (IV)" (Caspar Reiff)
15. "Théoden's Battle Cry" (Caspar Reiff)
16. "At Théoden's Death" (Caspar Reiff)
17. "Snowmane's Epitaph" (Caspar Reiff)
18. "Burial Song of Théoden" (Caspar Reiff)
19. "Long List of the Ents, No. 2" (Peter Hall)
20. "Sam's Invocation of Elven Hymn to Elbereth Gilthoniel" (Peter Hall)
21. "Call to Arms of the Rohirrim" (Caspar Reiff)
22. "Eagle's Song" (Caspar Reiff)

== Credits ==
- Peter Hall – founder, composer, vocals, guitar
- Caspar Reiff – founder, composer, guitar
- Signe Asmussen – vocals
- Morten Ernst Lassen – vocals
- Katja Nielsen – double-bass
- Øyvind Ougaard – accordion
- Morten Ryelund Sørensen – violin
- Mads Thiemann – vocals
- Jørgen Ditlevsen – vocals
- Kurt Ravn – vocals
- Nick Keir – vocals
- The Danish National Chamber Choir/DR
- The Danish Radio Sinfonietta/DR
- Christopher Lee – recitation
