= Namárië =

Elvish poem by J. R. R. Tolkien

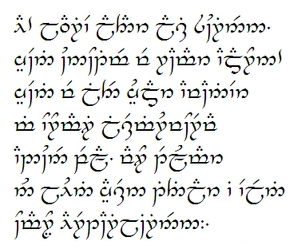
The first stanza of "Namárië", a Quenya poem written in Tengwar script

"Namárië" (pronounced [na.ˈmaː.ri.ɛ]) is a poem by J. R. R. Tolkien written in one of his constructed languages, Quenya, and published in The Lord of the Rings. (Note: Tolkien 1954a, Book 2, ch. 8 "Farewell to Lórien") It is subtitled "Galadriel's Lament in Lórien", which in Quenya is Altariello nainië Lóriendessë. The poem appears, too, in a book of musical settings by Donald Swann of songs from Middle-earth, The Road Goes Ever On; the Gregorian plainsong-like melody was hummed to Swann by Tolkien. The poem is the longest Quenya text in The Lord of the Rings and also one of the longest continuous texts in Quenya that Tolkien ever wrote. An English translation is provided in the book.

"Namárië" has been set to music by The Tolkien Ensemble, by the Finnish composer Toni Edelmann for a theatre production, and by the Spanish band Narsilion. Part of the poem is sung by a female chorus in a scene of Peter Jackson's The Fellowship of the Ring to music by Howard Shore.

== Poem ==
The poem names Valimar, the residence of the Valar and the Vanyar Elves; the Calacirya, the gap in the Pelori Mountains that lets the light of the Two Trees stream out across the sea to Middle-earth; and Oiolossë ("Ever-white") or Taniquetil, the holy mountain, the tallest of the Pelori Mountains; the Valar Manwë and his spouse Varda, to whom the poem is addressed, lived on its summit. (Note: Tolkien 1977, "Valaquenta")

The poem starts and ends as follows:

Quenya: Part of Namárië
Altariello nainië Lóriendessë

Ai! Laurië lantar lassi súrinen,
yéni únótimë ve rámar aldaron!
Yéni ve lintë yuldar avánier
mi oromardi lisse-miruvóreva
Andúnë pella, Vardo tellumar
nu luini yassen tintilar i eleni
ómaryo airetári-lírinen.

.....ar hísië
untúpa Calaciryo míri oialë.
Sí vanwa ná, Rómello vanwa, Valimar!

Namárië! Nai hiruvalyë Valimar!
Nai elyë hiruva! Namárië!

Translation: "Farewell"
"Galadriel's Lament in Lórien"

Ah! Like gold fall the leaves in the wind,
long years numberless as the wings of trees!
The years have passed like swift draughts
of the sweet mead in lofty halls beyond the West,
beneath the blue vaults of Varda
wherein the stars tremble
in the song of her voice, holy and queenly.

.....and mist
covers the jewels of Calacirya for ever.
Now lost, lost for those from the East is Valimar!

Farewell! Maybe thou shalt find Valimar.
Maybe even thou shalt find it. Farewell!

Tolkien provided a guide to how to pronounce and intone the poem in the book of his songs, The Road Goes Ever On, which contains a setting of the poem to music, and an audio recording, by Donald Swann. The text there is accompanied by "a literal translation", on which Tolkien comments that the version in The Fellowship of the Ring is "sufficiently accurate".

== Settings ==
=== Donald Swann ===
The first line of Namárië as documented by Donald Swann for his song cycle, transcribed from the melody hummed to him by Tolkien.

Namárië was set to music by Donald Swann with Tolkien's help: Swann proposed a setting, but Tolkien replied that he had a different setting in mind, and hummed a Gregorian chant. Swann took this up, feeling that it worked perfectly with the poem, commenting:

In the following week I played it over many times to the Elvish words. There was no doubt that this monodic line from an early church tradition expressed the words ideally, not only the sadness of the word "Namárië", and the interjection "Ai!", but equally the ritual mood of the Elves.

The sheet music and an audio recording are in their 1967 book The Road Goes Ever On. The setting is in the key of A major and in 4/4 time. A separate recording survives of Tolkien singing the poem to a Gregorian chant. Gill Gleeson, writing in Mallorn, states that it has the quality of an "improvisatory plainsong for voice and (melodic) instrument, a self-contained unharmonised melody." She describes it as "finely balanced in proportion, and held in tension between two modal scales", with the reciting-note C^{#} as a "pivot". She likens the instrumental mode to a "descending melodic minor scale" in F^{#}, with the vocal mode in A major.

=== The Tolkien Ensemble ===
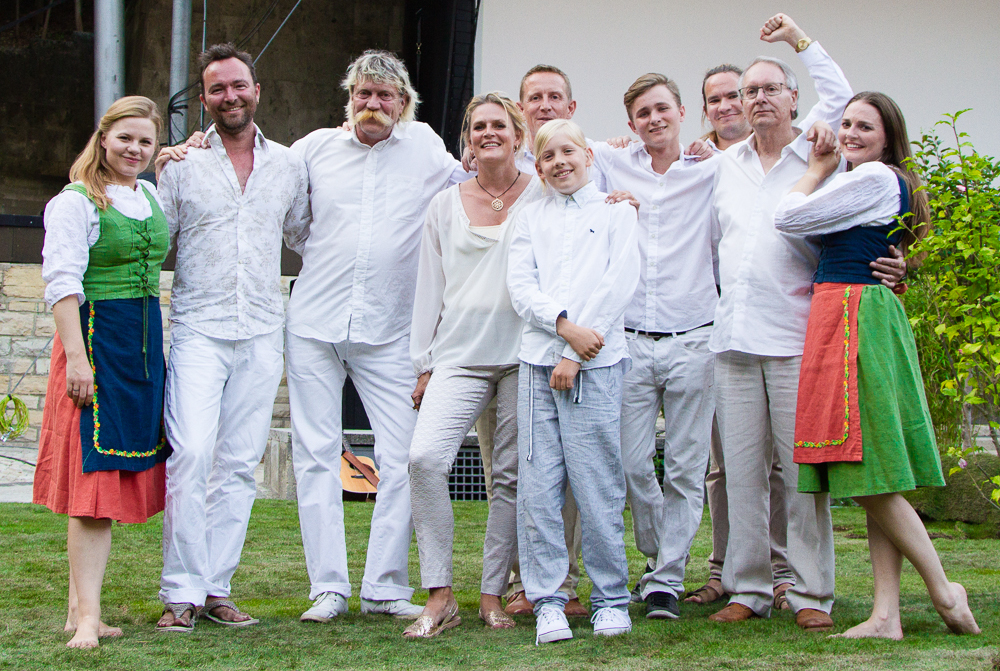
The Danish Tolkien Ensemble has recorded two versions of Namárië, one set to music in Quenya, one spoken in English.

Between 1997 and 2005, the Danish Tolkien Ensemble published four CDs featuring every poem from The Lord of the Rings. The recordings included two versions of "Namárië", both composed by the ensemble leader Caspar Reiff. They are both on the album An Evening in Rivendell, sung by the Danish Mezzo-soprano Signe Asmussen. One sets the original Quenya text to music; the other features the English translation.

=== Howard Shore ===
In his music for The Lord of the Rings film series, composed between 2000 and 2004 to support Peter Jackson's film trilogy, Howard Shore made use of part of Namárië. The scene "The Fighting Uruk-hai" is accompanied, non-diegetically, by a female chorus singing the poem in Quenya, over images of the Elf-lady Galadriel gazing at the remaining eight members of the Fellowship of the Ring as they leave Lothlórien.

=== Other composers ===
In 2001, the Finnish composer Toni Edelmann wrote a setting of the poem for the musical Sagan om Ringen ("The Lord of the Rings") at the Swedish Theatre, Helsinki. In 2008, the Spanish neoclassical dark wave band Narsilion published a studio album called Namárië. Among other Tolkien-inspired songs it features a track Namárië: El Llanto de Galadriel ("Namárië: Galadriel's Lament"). Kogaionon magazine called it a mature and complex album "with a medieval and ... forceful aura".

== Analysis ==
As the longest text in the Elvish language Quenya that Tolkien provided in The Lord of the Rings or elsewhere, Namárië has attracted the attention of linguists. Helge Fauskanger has made a word-by-word analysis of the text, noting that the version in The Road Goes Ever On is "nearly" identical to that in the novel: Tolkien added accent marks to indicate stronger and weaker stresses to guide the singer. Fauskanger describes the language used in the poem as the "Late Exilic" or "Third Age" variant of Quenya. Fauskanger comments that while "Valimar", named in the poem, normally denotes the city of the Valar, the poem uses it to mean the whole of Valinor, the blessed realm. Allan Turner states that Tolkien meant the poem to embody the Elvish culture from the deep past that Galadriel remembers. The poem does not rhyme or scan conventionally; Jonathan McColl, writing in Mallorn, comments that while he prefers poems which use those devices, he finds "even ... the translation" of Namárië poetic, while the original Quenya with its Gregorian setting is "lovely". (Note: The Tolkien scholar Tom Shippey, discussing other poems in The Lord of the Rings, writes that Tolkien uses multiple poetic devices, including internal half-rhyme, alliteration, and alliterative assonance. Further, he states of another Elvish poem, A Elbereth Gilthoniel, that Tolkien "believed that untranslated elvish would do a job that English could not". Shippey calls the usage "idiosyncratic and daring", and suggests that readers take something important from a song in another language, namely the feeling or style that it conveys, even if "it escapes a cerebral focus".)

The Quenya word namárië is a reduced form of á na márië, meaning literally "be well", an Elvish formula used for greeting and for farewell. (Note: Tolkien, J. R. R., "Parma Eldalamberon", 17, p. 162.) The earliest version of the poem was published posthumously in The Treason of Isengard. Tolkien did not provide a translation of that version, and some of the words used differ in form from those in the version that appeared in The Lord of the Rings. (Note: Tolkien 1989, pp. 284–285)

== Adaptations ==
The band Led Zeppelin adapted the first line of "Namárië" for the opening of their 1969 song "Ramble On" on their studio album Led Zeppelin II. The English line "Leaves are falling all around" represents Tolkien's "Ah! like gold fall the leaves in the wind". Further references to Tolkien's writing appear in the rest of the song, which mentions Gollum and Mordor.
