= A Night in Rivendell =

Studio album by The Tolkien Ensemble
- Released: April 2000
- Recorded: 1998–99
- Studio: Focus Recording, Kastels Kirken, Copenhagen, Denmark
- Genre: Classical
- Length: 54:16
- Label: Classico
- Producer: Morten Ryelund Sørensen

The Tolkien Ensemble chronology
An Evening in Rivendell (1997)	A Night in Rivendell (2000)	At Dawn in Rivendell (2003)

A Night In Rivendell is the second album by the Danish group the Tolkien Ensemble. It features songs composed to the lyrics found in J. R. R. Tolkien's the Lord of the Rings and forms the second part of what was to become a complete musical interpretation of all lyrics in the book.

== Track listing ==
1. "A Rhyme of Lore" (Caspar Reiff) – 2.03
2. "Gandalf's Song of Lórien" (Caspar Reiff) – 3.13
3. "Lament of the Rohirrim" (Caspar Reiff) – 3.05
4. "Frodo's Lament for Gandalf" (Peter Hall) – 5.46
5. "Bilbo's Song" (Caspar Reiff) – 3.59
6. "Gollums Song/Riddle" (Caspar Reiff) – 3.46
7. "Lament for Boromir" (Caspar Reiff) – 8.23
8. "Song in the Woods" (Peter Hall) – 1.44
9. "The Fall of Gil-galad" (Peter Hall) – 3.38
10. "Lament for Théoden" (Caspar Reiff) – 9.34
11. "Song of the Mounds of Mundborg" (Caspar Reiff) – 5.55
12. "Elven Hymn to Elbereth Gilthoniel, A Elbereth Gilthoniel..." (Caspar Reiff) – 2.09

== Credits ==
- Peter Hall – vocal, guitar, mandolin, Penny-whistle, Frodo and Sam
- Caspar Reiff - guitar
- Morten Ryelund Sørensen - violin
- Øyvind Ougaard - Accordion
- Morten Ernst Lassen – Aragorn
- Signe Asmussen – voice of Rivendell and Galadriel
- Mads Thiemann – Bilbo
- Ulrik Cold – Gandalf
- Kurt Ravn – Legolas
- Povl Dissing – Gollum
- Gabriella Persson – Bassoon
- Torben H. S. Svendsen – Double-bass
- Kresten Stubbe Teglbjerg – Piano
- Francis Norén – voices
- Morten Kramp – voices
- String quartet: Morten Ryelund, Mette Tjærby, Jørgen Eyvind Hansen and Dorthe Buch-Andersen
- The Chamber Choir Hymnia conducted by Flemming Windekilde

== Production ==
- Musical Director: Morten Ryelund Sørensen
- Producers: Caspar Reiff, Peter Hall and Morten Ryelund Sørensen
- Engineering: Hans Nielsen and Viggo Mangor
- Cover Illustration: Queen Margrethe II of Denmark
- Cover Design: Dan Eggers and Connie B. Berentzen
