= An Evening in Rivendell =

Studio album by The Tolkien Ensemble
- Released: 30 September 1997
- Recorded: 1997
- Studio: Focus Recording, Copenhagen, Denmark
- Genre: Classical
- Length: 67:49
- Label: Classico
- Producer: Morten Ryelund Sørensen

The Tolkien Ensemble chronology
An Evening in Rivendell (1997)	A Night in Rivendell (1999)

An Evening in Rivendell is the first album by the Danish group The Tolkien Ensemble. It features songs composed to the lyrics found in J. R. R. Tolkien's The Lord of the Rings and forms the first part of what was to become a complete musical interpretation of all lyrics in the book.

== Track listing ==
No.	Title	Writer(s)	Length
1.	"Verse of the Rings"	Caspar Reiff	4:06
2.	"The Old Walking Song, The Road..."	Caspar Reiff	4:58
3.	"Tom Bombadil's Song, Hey dol! Merry dol!"	Peter Hall	5:40
4.	"There is an inn, a merry old inn..."	Caspar Reiff and Peter Hall	4:58
5.	"Song of Beren and Lúthien"	Caspar Reiff	7:59
6.	"Galadriel's Song of Eldamar, I sang of leaves"	Caspar Reiff	6:23
7.	"Elven Hymn to Elbereth Gilthoniel, Snow-white! Snow-white!"	Caspar Reiff	5:31
8.	"The Ent and the Ent-wife"	Caspar Reiff	7:45
9.	"Sam's Rhyme of the Troll"	Peter Hall	5:19
10.	"Galadriel's Song of Eldamar, Ai! Laurië lantar..."	Caspar Reiff	6:10
11.	"Sam's Song in the Orc-tower"	Caspar Reiff and Peter Hall	5:20
12.	"The Old Walking Song, The Road..., Reprise"	Caspar Reiff	2:41

== Reception ==
Af Søren Aabyen, reviewing the album for the Danish Tolkien Association, found that rarely had any music appealed to him as much. He was delighted by the mezzo-soprano Signe Asmussen's mellow rendering of "Galadriel's Song of Eldamar". He enjoyed the playful hobbit-song "There is an Inn, a merry old Inn", and Caspar Reiff's suitably melancholy guitar for "The Old Walking Song" alongside the rich baritone voice of Mads Thiemann and the lyrical violin of Mette Tjærby. Aabyen noted also the pleasure of finding Queen Margaret of Denmark's illustrations in the accompanying booklet. Anthony Burdge and Jessica Burke, in The J. R. R. Tolkien Encyclopedia, note that the album was the first of four by the ensemble, complete with the queen's illustrations "greatly admired by Tolkien."

The Tolkien Ensemble called their Danish reviews "outstanding", noting that in other countries Tolkien Online had described it as "the most beautiful presentation of the poems of The Lord of the Rings", while Classic CD named it "Highly persuasive and splendidly performed".

== Credits ==
- Peter Hall – vocal, guitar, harmonica, penny-whistle, Frodo, Sam and Tom Bombadil
- Caspar Reiff – guitar
- Morten Ryelund Sørensen – violin
- Øyvind Ougaard – Accordion
- Morten Ernst Lassen – Aragorn
- Signe Asmussen – Galadriel and Ent-wife
- Mads Thiemann – Bilbo and Ent
- Ole Jegindø Norup – Gildor
- Melene Nordtorp – Goldberry
- Torben H. S. Svendsen – double-bass
- Peter Halaburt – oboe
- Jesper Korneliussen – Vibraphone, Marimba, bells and chimes
- Mette Tjærby – violin
- Anne Eltard – folk-violin
- Tom McEwan – percussion, spoons and dishes
- Maria Boelskov – harp
- Michael Friis – bass
- Berit Johanson – piano
- Nina Reintoft – cello
- The Commotio quartet: Morten Ryelund Sørensen, Mette Tjærby, Jørgen Eyvind Hansen and Nina Reintoft
- Male choir: Steffen Bruun, Johnny Johansen, Anders Holte, Björn Tengstrand, Frank Sylvan, Morten Clausen, Jacob Ægidius, Morten Ryelund Sørensen, Torben Eskildsen and Caspar Reiff

== Production ==
- Musical Direction: Morten Ryelund Sørensen
- Production: Caspar Reiff, Peter Hall and Morten Ryelund Sørensen
- Engineering: Hans Nielsen and Saqib
- Cover Illustration: Queen Margrethe II of Denmark
- Cover Design: Dan Eggers and Connie B. Berentzen
