= At Dawn in Rivendell =

Studio album by The Tolkien Ensemble
- Released: 11 March 2003
- Recorded: November 2001 – September 2002 in Copenhagen, Denmark
- Genre: Classical
- Length: 53:09
- Label: Decca
- Producer: Morten Ryelund Sørensen

The Tolkien Ensemble chronology
A Night in Rivendell (1999)	At Dawn in Rivendell (2003)	Leaving Rivendell (2005)

Professional ratings
Review scores
Source	Rating
Allmusic	3/5 stars
Sci-Fi Weekly	B

At Dawn in Rivendell is the third album by the Danish group the Tolkien Ensemble. It featured a guest appearance by the actor and singer Christopher Lee, who voiced the spoken word tracks and sang the part of the Ent Treebeard.

The album was broadly welcomed by critics, though they felt that many of the more serious settings were too modern and discordant for Tolkien's more traditional words. They enjoyed the cheerful hobbit-songs, and the final song, the Elvish hymn to Elbereth, sung by the mezzo-soprano Signe Asmussen, was admired.

== Album ==
At Dawn in Rivendell is an album of twenty tracks by the Tolkien Ensemble. All have lyrics from J. R. R. Tolkien's The Lord of the Rings; some of the tracks are spoken word; the remainder are songs with musical settings composed by Peter Hall or Caspar Reiff, the Ensemble's founders. The album forms the third part of what became a complete musical interpretation of all poems and songs in the book.

It is the first of the Tolkien Ensemble's albums to feature the actor Christopher Lee reciting the spoken poems; this brought the ensemble to the attention of many internationally.

== Reception ==
Michael Cunningham of The Tolkien Society praises Christopher Lee's voicework, conveying something of a solemn mood, echoing "the old northern spirit in the face of inexorable doom". In contrast, he enjoys the "capering melodies and good interplay of vocals" of the cheerful hobbit-songs ("A Walking Song", "A Drinking Song", and "A Bath Song"). Different again, he felt, was the "Elven Hymn to Elbereth Gilthoniel", which could have come across like much "Elven song" as "all too diaphanous", but which seemed solid and professional, with Signe Asmussen's mezzo-soprano and an Irish harp to weave a plausible Elvish landscape. Finally, Cunningham notes that the ensemble avoid the trap of writing another "cinematic score", instead creating a fresh and lively interpretation of Tolkien's songs.

Mark Donkers, reviewing the album for AllMusic, noted that it benefited from Lee's spoken word poems and his sung rendering of "Treebeard's Song". Donkers found it "quite a jaunty piece of orchestration [with] well-sung poetic renditions" of Tolkien's verse.

Grey Walker, for the Green Man Review, found the musicianship "of the highest possible standard", with classically trained voices and outstanding instrumentalists, but gave the album "mixed reactions". Lee shone at all he was given, whether as a deep rumbling Treebeard, a fine stern Malbeth the seer, or singing as Treebeard, though Walker found the musical setting for Treebeard's song "too discordant and modernistic". In fact, he found most of the "more serious pieces" too atonal or jarring for Tolkien's more traditional-sounding words. An exception was "Eomer's Song", where the "strong, wide sounds, full of sorrow and wrath" fitted well with the lyrics about riding "for wrath, now for ruin and a red nightfall!". By contrast, Walker found the happy "hobbit-ish" songs perfect, complete with the "rollicking mirth" of Øyvind Ougaard's accordion and Tom McEwen's entertaining percussion effects. The final song, "Elven Hymn to Elbereth Gilthoniel", which Walker had been dreading, was wonderful, with Signe Asmussen's soaring, ethereal voice. In his view, Helen Davies's Irish harp would have delighted Tolkien, exactly matching his description of Elvish music in his poem "Kortirion among the Trees": "for thin and clear and cold the note, as strand of silver glass remote".

== Track listing ==
1. "Verse of the Rings" (Caspar Reiff) – 1:20
2. "Song of Gondor" (Caspar Reiff) – 2:59
3. "A Walking Song (I)" (Peter Hall) – 2:50
4. "Warning of Winter" (Caspar Reiff) – 0:35
5. "Malbeth the Seer's Words" (Caspar Reiff) – 5:55
6. "A Drinking Song" (Peter Hall) – 2:46
7. "The Long List of the Ents, No. 1" (Peter Hall) – 2:17
8. "Éomer's Song" (Caspar Reiff) – 2:41
9. "Boromir's Riddle" (Caspar Reiff) – 0:34
10. "The Bath Song" (Peter Hall, Caspar Reiff) – 1:45
11. "Song of Lebennin" (Caspar Reiff) – 5:00
12. "Gandalf's Riddle of the Ents" (J. R. R. Tolkien) – 0:25
13. "Ho! Tom Bombadil" (Peter Hall) – 0:57
14. "The Riddle of Strider (I)" (Caspar Reiff) – 0:57
15. "Song of Nimrodel" (Caspar Reiff) – 4:42
16. "Treebeard's Song" (Peter Hall) – 4:11
17. "Farewell Song of Merry and Pippin" (Peter Hall) – 3:09
18. "Athelas" (Caspar Reiff) – 0:35
19. "A Walking Song (II)" (Peter Hall) – 1:38
20. "An Elven Hymn to Elbereth Gilthoniel (III)" (Caspar Reiff) – 7:44

== Credits ==
- Peter Hall – vocal, guitar, mandolin, Penny-whistle, Frodo and Sam
- Caspar Reiff – guitar
- Morten Ryelund Sørensen – violin
- Øyvind Ougaard – Accordion
- Morten Ernst Lassen – Aragorn
- Signe Asmussen – voice of Rivendell and Galadriel
- Mads Thiemann – Bilbo
- Ulrik Cold – Gandalf
- Kurt Ravn – Legolas
- Povl Dissing – Gollum
- Gabriella Persson – Bassoon
- Torben H. S. Svendsen – Double-bass
- Kresten Stubbe Teglbjerg – Piano
- Francis Norén – voices
- Morten Kramp – voices
- String quartet: Morten Ryelund, Mette Tjærby, Jørgen Eyvind Hansen and Dorthe Buch-Andersen
- The Chamber Choir Hymnia conducted by Flemming Windekilde
- Christopher Lee – spoken word, and Treebeard

== Production ==
- Musical direction: Morten Ryelund Sørensen
- Production: Caspar Reiff, Peter Hall and Morten Ryelund Sørensen
- Engineering: Hans Nielsen and Viggo Mangor
- Cover illustration: Queen Margrethe II of Denmark
- Cover design: Dan Eggers and Connie B. Berentzen
