= The Tolkien Ensemble =

Danish musical group

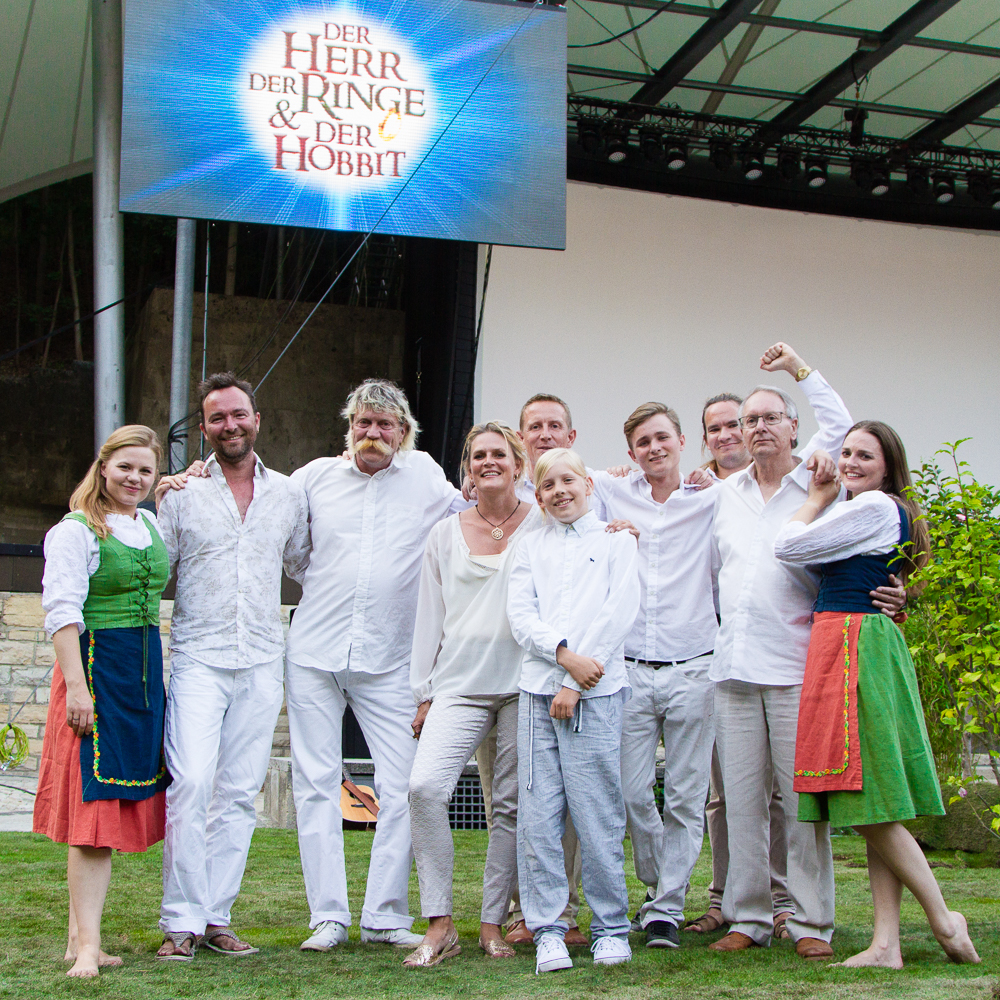
- The Tolkien Ensemble, 2015

Background information
- Origin: Denmark
- Genres: Symphonic music, folk music
- Years active: 1995–2013
- Label: Classico
- Members: Caspar Reiff, Peter Hall, Morten Ryelund Sørensen, Signe Asmussen, Øyvind Ougaard, Katja Nielsen
- Website: http://www.tolkien-ensemble.net/

The Tolkien Ensemble (founded in 1995) is a Danish ensemble which created "the world's first complete musical interpretation of the poems and songs from The Lord of the Rings". They published four CDs from 1997 to 2005, in which all the poems and songs of The Lord of the Rings are set to music. The project was approved by the Tolkien Estate. Queen Margrethe II of Denmark gave permission to use her illustrations on the CD covers.

Permanent members are Caspar Reiff and Peter Hall (composition, singing and guitar), Signe Asmussen (singing), Øyvind Ougaard (accordion), Katja Nielsen (double-bass), and Morten Ryelund Sørensen (conductor and violin). The ensemble have been described as elves, Tolkien's refined Middle-earth race, in contrast to the more rustic hobbit-like groups such as Brocéliande and the Hobbitons. Scholars have praised their settings as among the most atmospheric recordings of Tolkien's poems.

== History ==
Ensemble members first met in January 1996 at the Royal Danish Academy of Music. The founder members were (left to right) Mads Thiemann, Caspar Reiff, Mette Tjærby, Ole Norup & Signe Asmussen.

Composer Caspar Reiff founded the Tolkien Ensemble in Copenhagen in autumn 1995. At that time, Reiff (1971) was studying guitar at the Royal Danish Academy of Music in Copenhagen. He formed an ensemble consisting of fellow students from the academy and his former guitar teacher, the composer and musician Peter Hall (1946), LLCM (TD) London College of Music.

The goal set by the two composers, Reiff and Hall, was to create the world's first complete musical interpretation of the poems from J. R. R. Tolkien's "masterpiece" The Lord of the Rings. The ensemble, which was to form the base of this vision, was named 'The Tolkien Ensemble' — entirely devoted to the works of Tolkien. The ensemble first took shape with a group of invited musicians in January 1996 at the Royal Danish Academy of Music. The founder members (other than Reiff and Hall) were Mads Thiemann, Mette Tjærby, Ole Norup & Signe Asmussen.

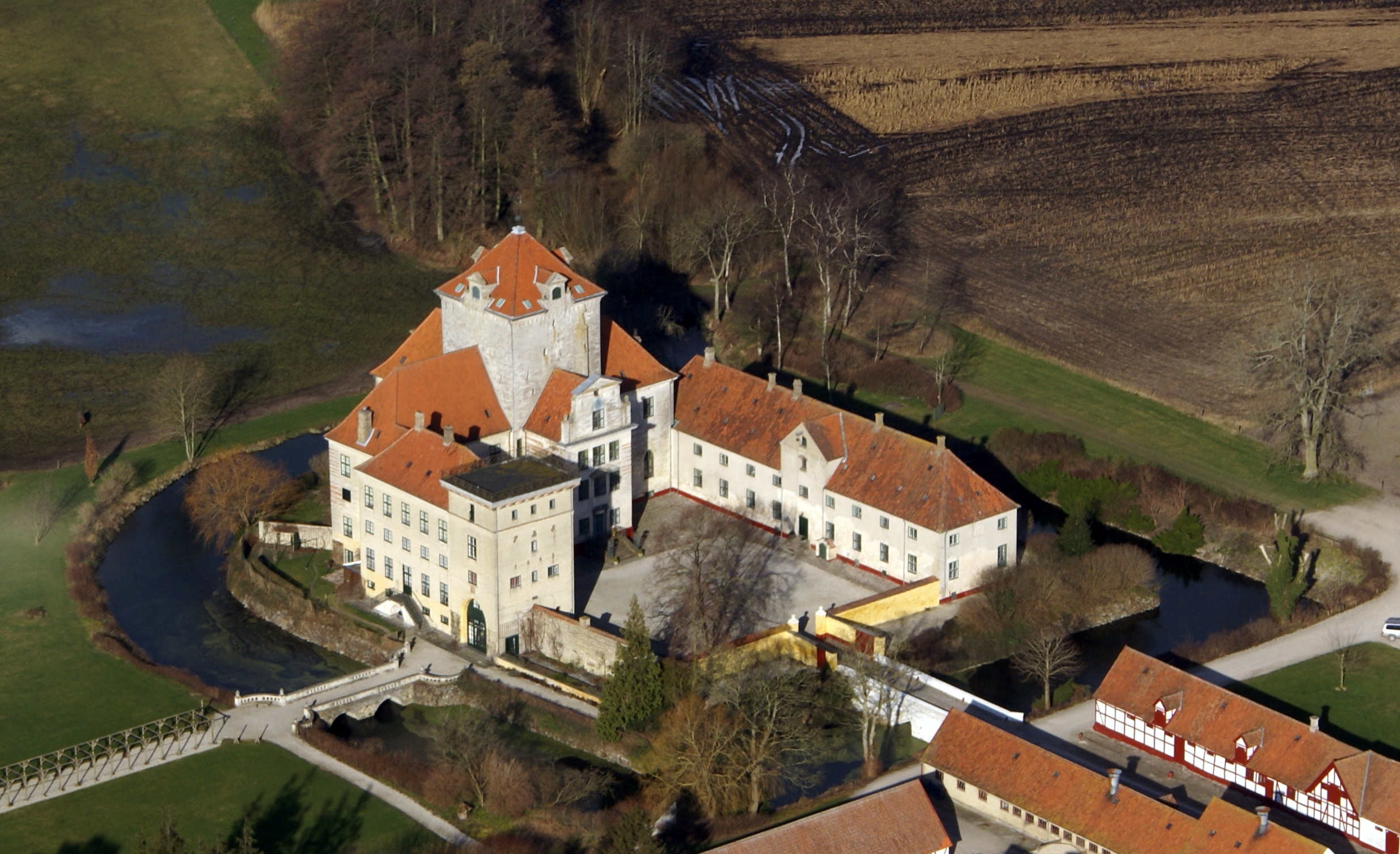
Gjorslev Castle, site of the ensemble's first concert, and described by Caspar Reiff as "a wonderful 'Lord of the Ring-ish' castle dating back to 1396"

The Tolkien Ensemble's first concert took place at Gjorslev Castle on 21 January 1996; this was followed by concerts in Denmark. In January 1997, Reiff and Peter Hall were granted permission by the Tolkien Estate to record the first 12 songs from The Lord of the Rings.

The two composers chose the young Danish conductor Morten Ryelund as producer and this was to have a major influence on the interpretation of the music and the project as a whole. Ryelund later became a full member of the Tolkien Ensemble and the ensemble was granted permission by Queen Margrethe II of Denmark to use her illustrations on the CD cover. These unique illustrations, created when she was Crown Princess of Denmark, became a recurrent feature on all the ensemble's later CDs.

The first album, An Evening in Rivendell, was released in autumn 1997 to widespread critical acclaim. A number of concerts followed. Notably, in a 1998 concert in Oxford, the audience included members of the Tolkien family, to the ensemble's delight.

An Evening in Rivendell was followed by the 2000 release A Night in Rivendell. The album contained more sombre songs from the Lord of The Rings; the ensemble worked with, among others, the singers Povl Dissing, who sang the part of Gollum, Kurt Ravn (Legolas) and Ulrik Cold (Gandalf).

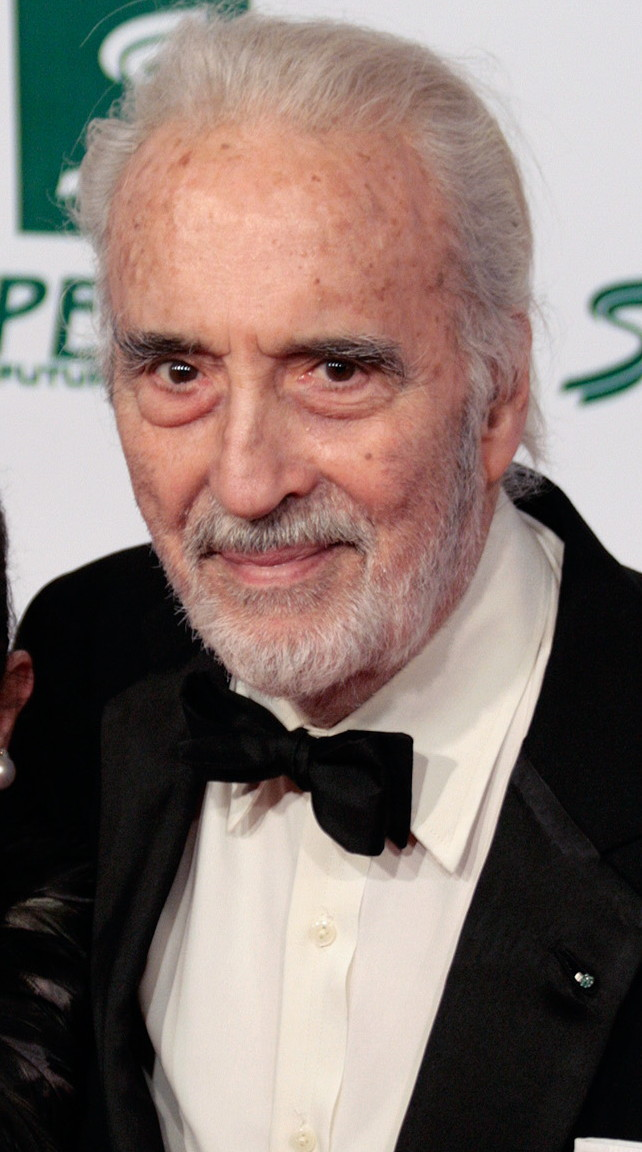
Christopher Lee, who had played Saruman in Peter Jackson's The Lord of the Rings film trilogy, performed on At Dawn in Rivendell and went on tour with the ensemble.

Interest in The Lord of the Rings grew dramatically in 2001 when Peter Jackson started to release his films of Tolkien's books. The Tolkien Ensemble was invited to take part in the Danish premiere of the first film in the Jackson's trilogy: The Lord of the Rings: The Fellowship of the Ring. Among the celebrities representing the film in Copenhagen was the actor Christopher Lee, who played the traitorous wizard Saruman. The Tolkien Ensemble invited him to take part in their third album, At Dawn in Rivendell, partly as narrator and partly as singer of Treebeard's songs. Lee's cooperation, combined with the growing interest for the work of Tolkien, resulted in a huge success for the album. It was released in 22 countries, was widely played by radio stations, and received excellent reviews. The International Herald Tribune called it "Total Lord of the Rings magic!" At Dawn in Rivendell later sold well worldwide. The cooperation with Lee developed to include concerts. In the autumn of 2002, Lee took part in a release concert at Tivoli Concert Hall. Then followed a major tour of, among other countries, England and Sweden, culminating in the summer of 2003 when the ensemble gave a concert in Denmark for an audience including HM Queen Margrethe II of Denmark and Prince Henrik of Denmark.

In 2004, the two composers, Reiff and Hall, together with Lee, took part in a major sell-out concert in Concertgebouw, Amsterdam. In 2005, The Tolkien Ensemble played at two major Lord of the Rings concerts at Ledreborg Castle, Denmark to an audience of over 22,000 people. Among the performers was the ensemble's new member, Nick Keir of the Scottish folk-trio The McCalmans. These concerts, with the Danish National Chamber Orchestra, the Danish National Chamber Choir, and soloists, marked the release of the fourth and last album of the series, Leaving Rivendell. Besides Lee, Keir, the Danish National Chamber Orchestra/DR and the Danish National Chamber Choir/DR performed with The Tolkien Ensemble on the fourth album. The ensemble toured Europe in 2007, combining their own works with soundtrack pieces from Howard Shore's soundtrack to the film trilogy as well as live narration by Lee. In 2008, the ensemble gave their longest concert tour of German cities including Berlin's Friedrichstadt-Palast, Hamburg, Hannover, Dresden, Bremen, and Leipzig's Gewandhaus. The ensemble continued to give concert tours each year until 2013.

The release of the four-CD-box in 2006 marked the completion of more than ten years' work and the attainment of the ensemble's goal: the release of their Complete Songs & Poems from The Lord of the Rings. More than 150 professional musicians participated in the effort. The four-CD-box is dedicated to the memory of J.R.R. Tolkien, to The Tolkien Society in Oxford, and to the millions of people for whom The Lord of the Rings has a special place in their hearts.

== Reception ==
The Tolkien scholar David Bratman calls the ensemble "[refined] elves", unlike groups like Brocéliande and the Hobbitons, who he calls "[rustic] hobbits in ethos". He calls their music "some of the most atmospheric Tolkien settings on disc". He mentions Lee's recitation of some of Tolkien's poems, where "[he] impersonates Treebeard half rhythmically talking and half singing, à la Rex Harrison as Professor Higgins." Bratman describes the ensemble's approach as an "effective combination" of folk and classical, and the ensemble itself as consisting of conservatory students and folk musicians. In his view there is an "ethereal air of wistfulness" throughout the Tolkien Ensemble's music, which contributes powerfully to their Elvish songs; he at once adds that their hobbit songs work out well too, with a light guitar setting and simple sturdy tune that handles Tom Bombadil's songs effectively. He especially admires the third album's last track, "Sam's invocation of Elven Hymn to Elbereth Gilthoniel" by Hall, where "Frodo's walking song meets an Elvish hymn to Elbereth".

The scholar of English literature Leslie A. Donovan calls the Ensemble's four albums the most notable of the attempts "to capture the airs of Middle-earth by creating their own music for Tolkien's lyrics". The Green Man Review writes that the Tolkien Ensemble "has made excellent use" of the songs in The Road Goes Ever On. Af Søren Aabyen, reviewing the Ensemble's first album, An Evening in Rivendell, for the Danish Tolkien Society, found that rarely had any music appealed to him as much. He was delighted by the mezzo-soprano Asmussen's mellow rendering of "Galadriel's Song of Eldamar". He enjoyed the playful hobbit-song "There is an Inn, a merry old Inn", and Reiff's suitably melancholy guitar for "The Old Walking Song" alongside the rich baritone voice of Thiemann and the lyrical violin of Tjærby. Aabyen noted also the pleasure of finding Queen Margrethe II of Denmark's illustrations in the accompanying booklet. Anthony Burdge and Jessica Burke, in The J. R. R. Tolkien Encyclopedia, note that the album was complete with the queen's illustrations "greatly admired by Tolkien."

== Permanent members ==
- Peter Hall – founder, composer, vocals, guitar
- Caspar Reiff – founder, composer, guitar
- Signe Asmussen – vocals
- Morten Ernst Lassen – vocals
- Katja Nielsen – double-bass
- Øyvind Ougaard – accordion
- Morten Ryelund Sørensen – conductor, violin
- Mads Thiemann – vocals

== Discography ==
- Complete Songs & Poems (2006), consisting of:
  - An Evening in Rivendell (1997)
    Malene Nordtorp, Ole Jegindø Norup, Mads Thiemann, Morten Ernst Lassen, Commotio-Kvartetten choir, Polkageist.
  - A Night in Rivendell (2000)
    Ulrik Cold, Kurt Ravn, Povl Dissing, Mads Thiemann, Morten Ernst Lassen, The Chamber Choir Hymnia.
  - At Dawn in Rivendell (2002)
    Kurt Ravn, Morten Ernst Lassen, Peter Hall, Tom McEwan, Caspar Reiff, Kammerkoret Camerata, Copenhagen Young Strings. Recitation by Christopher Lee.
  - Leaving Rivendell (2005)
    Jørgen Ditlevsen, Kurt Ravn, Nick Keir, DR VokalEnsemblet, the Danish Radio Sinfonietta/DR. Recitation by Christopher Lee.

== See also ==
- Works inspired by J. R. R. Tolkien
