= A Walking Song =

Poem in The Lord of the Rings

"A Walking Song" is a poem in The Lord of the Rings. It appears in the third chapter, entitled "Three is Company". It is given its title in the work's index to songs and poems. (Note: Tolkien 1955, Index) There is a companion poem near the end of the novel. The poem has been set to music by the Danish group The Tolkien Ensemble. The road of the poem has been seen as a metaphor for destiny and experience, for both Bilbo and Frodo.

While the poem itself does not appear in The Lord of the Rings film trilogy, parts of it are featured throughout, including in the song "The Edge of Night" sung by Billy Boyd in The Lord of the Rings: The Return of the King which has lyrics from the last verse.

== Context ==
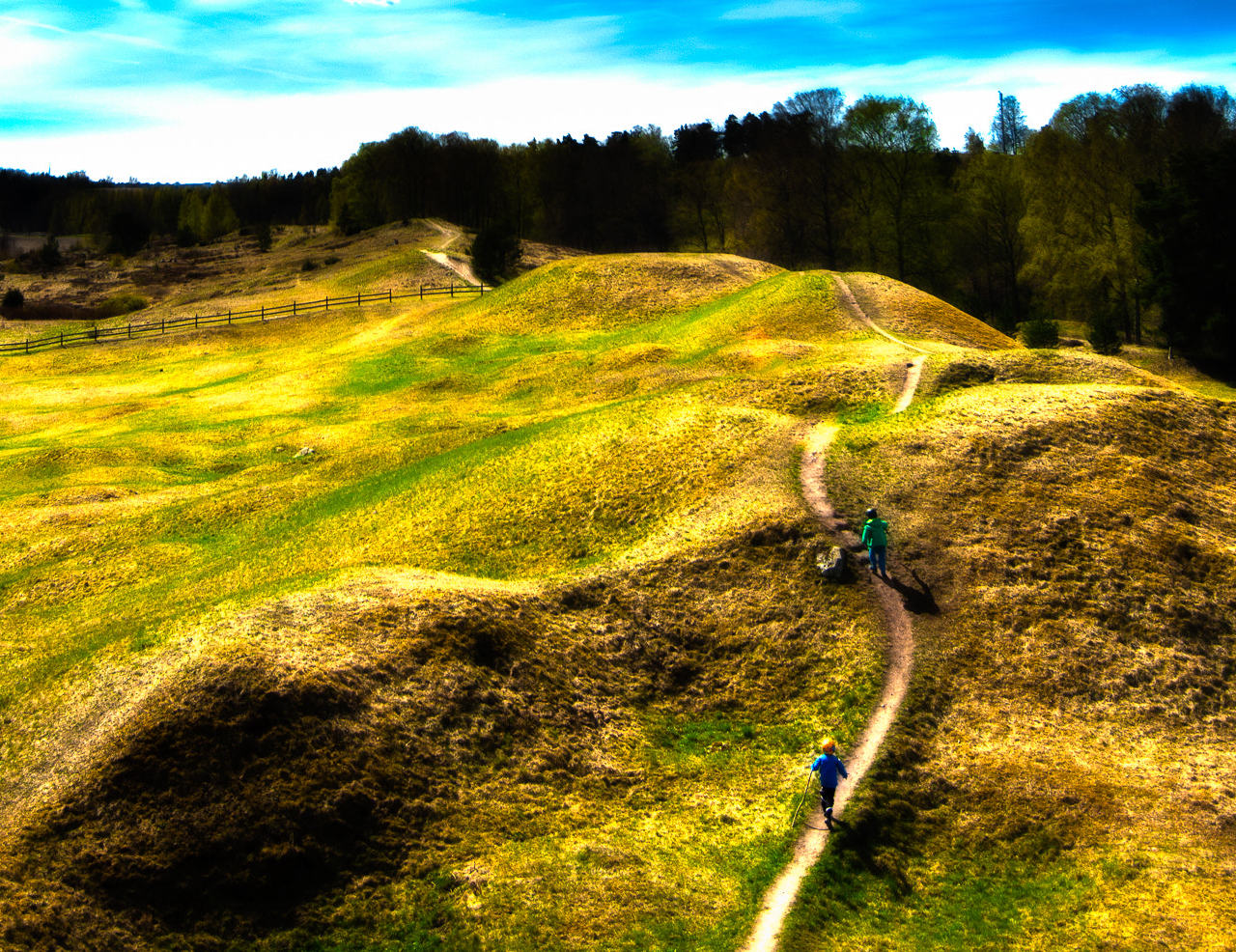
The Hobbits, having set out across the Shire, sing a song as they walk at the start of their epic journey.

The hobbit Frodo Baggins is travelling to Bucklebury in the Shire, accompanied by his gardener and friend Sam Gamgee and his kinsman Pippin Took. Frodo is ostensibly moving to a newly purchased house, having sold his hobbit-hole to his relatives, the Sackville-Bagginses. However, he and Sam have secretly planned to journey beyond, to Bree where he will meet again with Gandalf, so that they can travel to Rivendell; Frodo has the Ring of the Dark Lord Sauron in his possession, and he believes it will be safe there. They journey into the night, and at this point

They began to hum softly, as hobbits have a way of doing as they walk along, especially when they are drawing near to home at night. With most hobbits it is a supper-song or a bed-song; but these hobbits hummed a walking-song (though not, of course, without any mention of supper and bed). (Note: Tolkien 1954a, "Three is Company")

The song begins:

Upon the hearth the fire is red,
Beneath the roof there is a bed;
But not yet weary are our feet,
Still round the corner we may meet
A sudden tree or standing stone
That none have seen but we alone.

Frodo's uncle Bilbo Baggins, who had adopted him, had made up the words "to a tune that was as old as the hills, and taught it to Frodo as they walked in the lanes of the Water-valley and talked about Adventure". After the song ends, the hobbits encounter a Black Rider for the second time.

A different walking song, "The Road Goes Ever On", appears in different versions in The Hobbit, in two places in The Fellowship of the Ring – the first two by Bilbo, the third instance spoken by Frodo, alongside "A Walking Song"; (Note: Tolkien 1954a, book 1, ch. 1 "A Long-Expected Party") (Note: Tolkien 1954a, book 1, ch. 3 "Three is Company") and again in The Return of the King, where again it is voiced by Bilbo. (Note: Tolkien 1955, book 6, ch. 6 "Many Partings")

"A Walking Song" is mirrored at the end of the novel, in the chapter "The Grey Havens". Frodo sings part of the song with slightly changed words, as he is leaving for the Undying Lands. (Note: Tolkien 1955, book 6, ch. 9 "The Grey Havens")

== Interpretation ==
The road in A Walking Song has been seen as a metaphor for destiny and experience for both Bilbo and Frodo that begins at their home, Bag End. According to Tom Shippey, the name Bag End is a direct translation of French cul-de-sac meaning a dead end or a road with only one outlet. The journeys of Bilbo and Frodo have been interpreted as such a confined road as they both start and end their respective adventures in Bag End. According to Don D. Elgin, A Walking Song is "a song about the roads that go ever on until they return at last to the familiar things they have always known."

The Old Straight Road allows the Elves to sail from Middle-earth to Valinor. Frodo is one of the few mortals allowed to take that road.

Shippey writes that especially in the second version of the song, the wording subtly changed to be more definite, even final, when Frodo knows he will soon leave Middle-earth, he sings of taking the hidden paths.

A day will come at last when I
Shall take the hidden paths that run
West of the Moon, East of the Sun.

The verse alludes to his coming journey on the Old Straight Road, the Elvish path normally barred to mortals that departs from Arda at a tangent, going directly to Valinor, somewhere far away in the Uttermost West. Frodo is one of the few mortals allowed to take that road, departing with the Elves from the Grey Havens. This version of the song has been likened to Nick Bottom's dream in William Shakespeare's A Midsummer Night's Dream, which speaks of something that "the eye of man hath not heard, the ear of man hath not seen".

Ralph C. Wood writes that from a Christian point of view, the song references the inevitable journey towards death and beyond.

== Adaptations ==
=== In film ===
Part of "A Walking Song" is featured in Peter Jackson's 2003 The Lord of the Rings: The Return of the King. Some lines from the poem are part of a larger montage entitled "The Steward of Gondor", written by Howard Shore and arranged by Philippa Boyens. The song is called "The Edge of Night" after a phrase in the lyrics. Its melody was composed by Billy Boyd, who plays Pippin. The lyrics sung in the film are:

Home is behind, the world ahead
And there are many paths to tread
Through shadow, to the edge of night
Until the stars are all alight
Mist and shadow
Cloud and shade
All shall fade
All shall fade

In the film version, Denethor, the Steward of Gondor residing in its capital Minas Tirith, asks Pippin to sing for him while he eats. At the same time, Denethor's son Faramir makes a futile attempt to retake the city of Osgiliath, as requested by his father. Pippin's song is cut down from Tolkien's poem, the lines being a rewrite of part of the last stanza. According to Jackson, the song was devised while shooting the film. Boyd envisioned the song to be one that Pippin had "probably heard his grandfather sing, you know, from when the hobbits were looking for the Shire." The song was recorded in Abbey Road Studios in London. Boyd called it "a huge highlight" of his career. Paul Broucek, executive music producer at New Line Cinema, comments: "Instead of a noisy battle scene, you have the juxtaposition of the beautiful, haunting melody that Billy created and sings, and that Howard [Shore] supports with very simple underpinnings of orchestra growing out of it." The scenes featuring "The Edge of Night" were largely invented by the film's writers; in the book, although Denethor asks Pippin if he can sing, no song is ever requested. (Note: Tolkien 1955, "The Siege of Gondor")

Shore wrote the orchestral section of "The Sacrifice of Faramir", which frames Boyd's song. The melody echoes Shore's Gondor theme. (Note: Gondor in Decline theme (listening sample). Archived 29 September 2017 at the Wayback Machine) Frodo's variation of the song was used for the film soundtrack, at the point when Frodo and company are at the Grey Havens, but with the lyrics translated into Sindarin by David Salo. The phrase "home is behind, the world ahead" is uttered by Gandalf near the beginning of the 2012 film The Hobbit: An Unexpected Journey, as Bilbo and the dwarves leave the Shire for the first time.

=== Musical settings ===
Both versions of the poem have been set to music by the Danish group The Tolkien Ensemble, with melodies composed by one of its members, Peter Hall. They appear on the group's album At Dawn in Rivendell (2002). A cover of the "Edge of Night" song as used in the film appears on the eponymous final album of a former Tolkien Ensemble member, Nick Keir.

== See also ==
- Music of the Hobbit film series
- The Road Goes Ever On (song), also called The Old Walking Song
