= The Road Goes Ever On (song) =

Walking songs from The Lord of the Rings

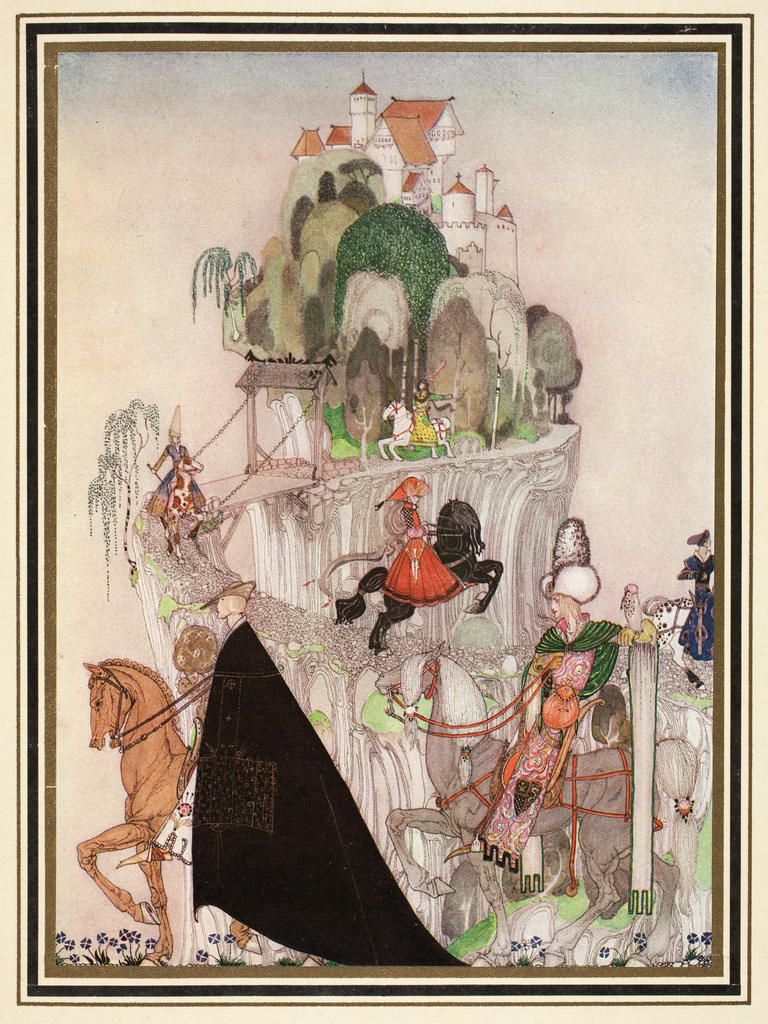
Illustration of the road by Kay Nielsen for the 1914 fairy tale East of the Sun and West of the Moon, whose title Tolkien uses in one of his walking songs for Aman, the desired other world.

"The Road Goes Ever On" is a title that encompasses several walking songs that J. R. R. Tolkien wrote for his Middle-earth legendarium. Within the stories, the original song was composed by Bilbo Baggins and recorded in The Hobbit. Different versions of it also appear in The Lord of the Rings, along with some similar walking songs.

Scholars have noted that Tolkien's road is a plain enough symbol for life and its possibilities, and that Middle-earth is a world of such roads, as both The Hobbit and The Lord of the Rings begin and end at the door of Bag End, Bilbo's home. They have observed, too, that if "the lighted inn" on the road means death, then the road is life, and both the song and the novels can be read as speaking of the process of psychological individuation. The walking song gives its name to Donald Swann's 1967 song-cycle The Road Goes Ever On, where it is the first in the list. All the versions of the song have been set to music by the Tolkien Ensemble.

== Tolkien's versions ==
=== In The Hobbit ===
The original version of the song is recited by Bilbo in chapter 19 of The Hobbit, at the end of his journey back to the Shire. Coming to the top of a rise he sees his home in the distance, and stops and says the following: (Note: Tolkien 1937, ch. 19 "The Last Stage")

Roads go ever ever on,
Over rock and under tree,
By caves where never sun has shone,
By streams that never find the sea;
Over snow by winter sown,
And through the merry flowers of June,
Over grass and over stone,
And under mountains in the moon.

Roads go ever ever on
Under cloud and under star,
Yet feet that wandering have gone
Turn at last to home afar.
Eyes that fire and sword have seen
And horror in the halls of stone
Look at last on meadows green
And trees and hills they long have known.

=== In The Lord of the Rings ===
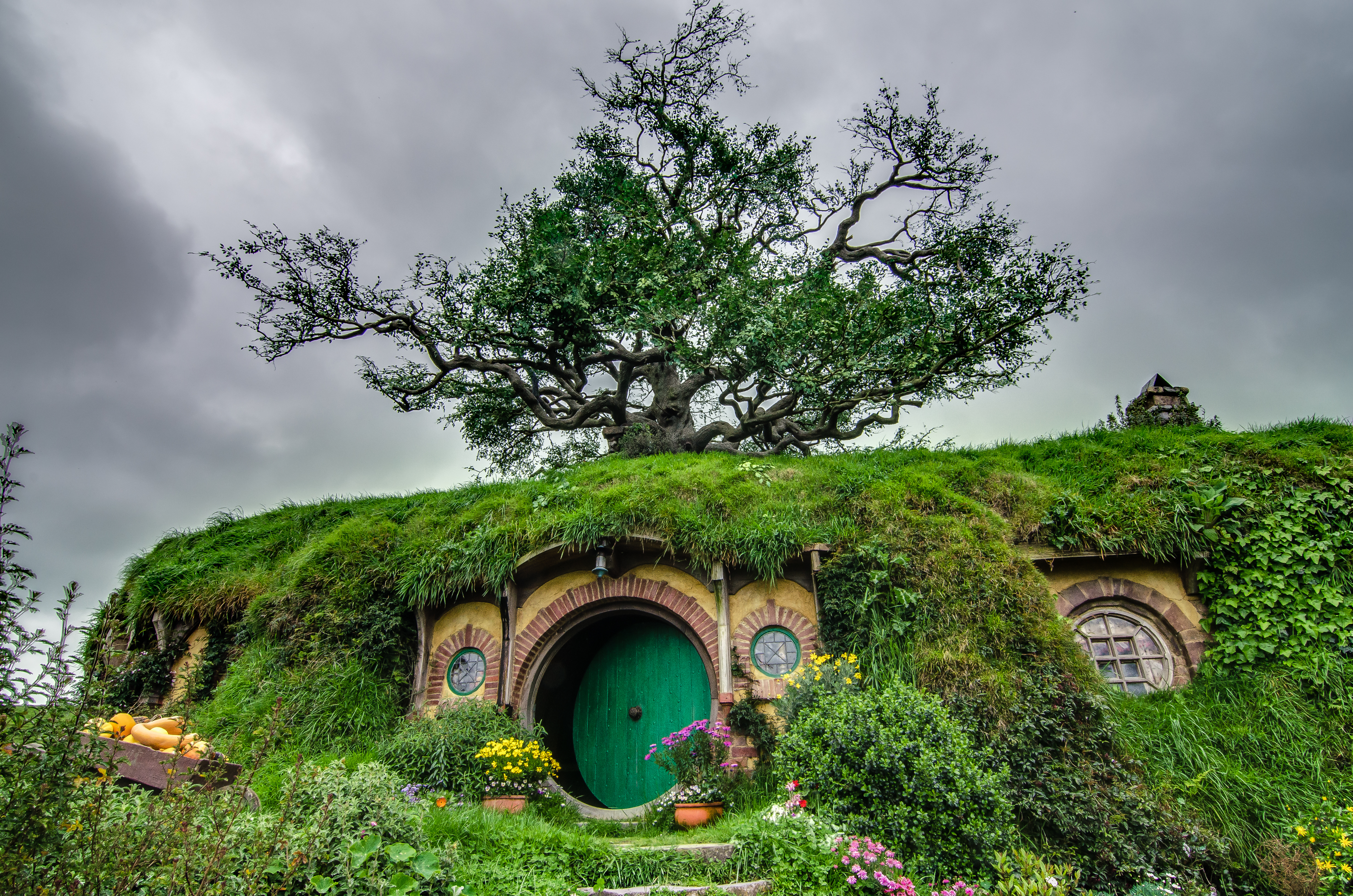
"The door where it began": (Note: Tolkien 1954a, book 1, ch. 1 "A Long-expected Party") the house of Bilbo and later Frodo Baggins at Bag End, Hobbiton, as created for Peter Jackson's Middle-earth films

There are three versions of "The Road Goes Ever On" in The Lord of the Rings. The first is in The Fellowship of the Ring, Book 1, Chapter 1. The song is sung by Bilbo when he leaves the Shire. He has given up the One Ring, leaving it for Frodo to deal with, and is setting off to visit Rivendell, so that he may finish writing his book.

The Road goes ever on and on
Down from the door where it began.
Now far ahead the Road has gone,
And I must follow, if I can,
Pursuing it with eager feet,
Until it joins some larger way
Where many paths and errands meet.
And whither then? I cannot say.

The second version appears in Book 1, Chapter 3. It is identical to the first, except for changing the word "eager" to "weary" in the fifth line. It is spoken aloud, slowly, by Frodo, as he and his companions arrive at a familiar road – the Stock Road – on their journey to leave the Shire. (Note: Tolkien 1954a, book 1, ch. 3 "Three is Company")

The third version appears in The Return of the King, Book 6, Chapter 6. It is spoken by Bilbo in Rivendell after the hobbits have returned from their journey. Bilbo is now an old, sleepy hobbit, who murmurs the verse and then falls asleep. (Note: Tolkien 1955, book 6, ch. 6 "Many Partings")

The Road goes ever on and on
Out from the door where it began.
Now far ahead the Road has gone,
Let others follow it who can!
Let them a journey new begin,
But I at last with weary feet
Will turn towards the lighted inn,
My evening-rest and sleep to meet.

The scholar of humanities Brian Rosebury quotes Frodo's recollection to the other hobbits of Bilbo's thoughts on 'The Road': "He used often to say there was only one Road; that it was like a great river: its springs were at every doorstep, and every path was its tributary. 'It's a dangerous business, Frodo, going out of your door,' he used to say. 'You step into the Road, and if you don't keep your feet, there is no knowing where you might be swept off to.'" Rosebury comments that the "homespun symbolism" here is plain enough, that "the Road stands for life, or rather for its possibilities, indeed probabilities, of adventure, commitment, and danger; for the fear of losing oneself, and the hope of homecoming". He observes further that Middle-earth is distinctly "a world of roads", as seen in The Hobbit and The Lord of the Rings, both of which "begin and end at the door of Bag-End".

The Tolkien scholar Tom Shippey contrasts the versions of the "Old Walking Song" sung by Bilbo and Frodo. Bilbo follows the "Road ... with eager feet", hoping to reach the peace of Rivendell, to retire and take his ease; whereas Frodo sings "with weary feet", hoping somehow to reach Mordor bearing the Ring, and to try to destroy it in the Cracks of Doom: very different destinations and errands. Shippey points out that "if 'the lighted inn' on the road means death, then 'the Road' must mean life", and the poem and the novel could be speaking of the psychological journey of individuation.

=== A different walking song ===
Since the Downfall of Númenor and the Changing of the World, "the hidden paths that run / West of the Moon, East of the Sun" have been the only way to reach Elvenhome, Valinor.

Similar changes in mood and words are seen in two versions of "A Walking Song", in the same metre and similarly at the start and end of The Lord of the Rings.

The first version, in the chapter "Three is Company", is sung by the hobbits when they are walking through The Shire, just before they meet a company of elves. Three stanzas are given in the text, with the first stanza starting "Upon the hearth the fire is red...". The following extract is from the second stanza of the song.

Still round the corner there may wait
A new road or a secret gate,
And though we pass them by today,
Tomorrow we may come this way
And take the hidden paths that run
Towards the Moon or to the Sun.

It is this part of the song that is reprised with different words later in the book. This new version is sung softly by Frodo as he and Sam walk in the Shire a few years after they have returned, and as Frodo prepares to meet Elrond and others and journey to the Grey Havens to take ship into the West.

Still round the corner there may wait
A new road or a secret gate,
And though I oft have passed them by,
A day will come at last when I
Shall take the hidden paths that run
West of the Moon, East of the Sun.

The final line of the verse is a variant on the phrase "East of the Sun and West of the Moon", which is used in fairy-stories like the Norwegian tale of that name for another world that is fantastically difficult to reach – in this case Aman, which can only be reached by the Old Straight Road, accessible only to elves since the world was remade.

== Musical arrangements ==
=== Classical music ===
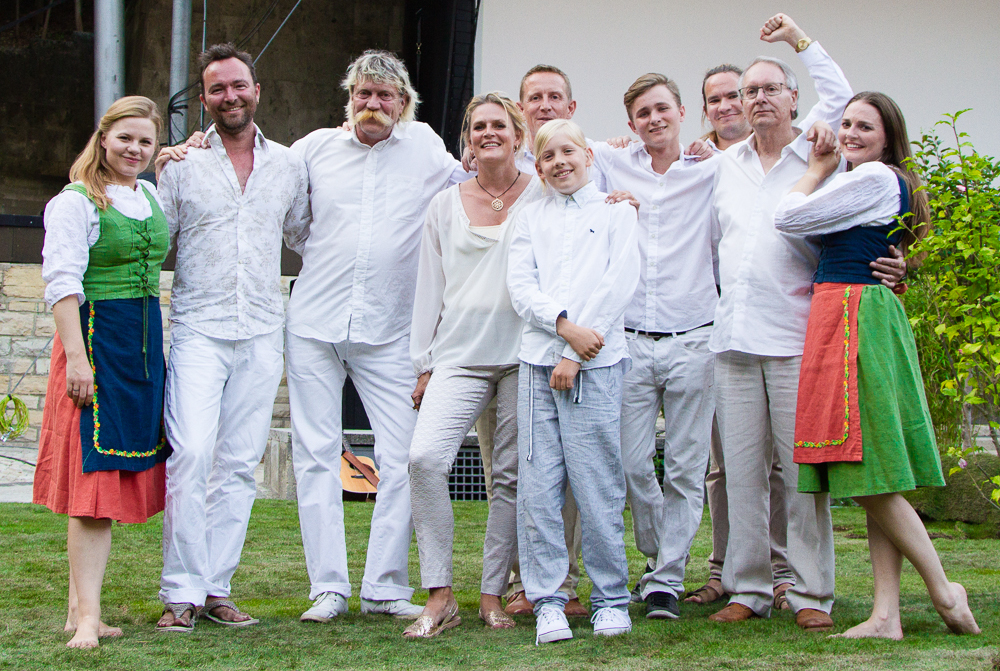
The Danish Tolkien Ensemble has set all the versions of "The Road Goes Ever On" to music.

The title song and several others were set to music by Donald Swann as part of the book and recording The Road Goes Ever On, named for this song. The entire song cycle has been set to music in 1984 by the composer Johan de Meij; another setting of the cycle is by the American composer Craig Russell, in 1995. All the songs have been set to music by The Tolkien Ensemble across their four Tolkien albums, starting with An Evening in Rivendell, as part of the now completed project of setting all poems in The Lord of the Rings to music. The UC Berkeley Alumni Chorus commissioned the American composer Gwyneth Walker to set the poem to music in 2006, which she did in several musically unrelated ways.

=== Film, radio, and musical theatre ===
A musical version of some sections of this song by Glenn Yarbrough can be heard in Rankin/Bass's 1977 animated film version of The Hobbit. A full song, Roads, was written for the film; it can be heard on the soundtrack and story LP. The same melody was used in Rankin/Bass's 1980 animated version of The Return of the King. The song can be heard in the 1981 BBC radio version, sung by Bilbo (John Le Mesurier) to a tune by Stephen Oliver.

A musical version of some sections of the song can be heard in the 2001 film The Lord of the Rings: The Fellowship of the Ring, composed by Howard Shore. It is sung by Gandalf (Ian McKellen) in the opening scene, and also by Bilbo (Ian Holm) as he leaves Bag End. Gandalf's singing can be heard on the track "Bag End" on Complete Recordings of The Lord of the Rings: The Fellowship of the Ring and Bilbo's on "Keep It Secret, Keep It Safe".

A section of the song can also be heard in "Use Well the Days", a song composed by Annie Lennox and Howard Shore for the end credits of the 2003 film The Lord of the Rings: The Return of the King, though ultimately replaced by "Into the West", also composed by Lennox and Shore.

Large parts of the song were included in Billy Boyd's "The Last Goodbye" on the soundtrack and in the credits of The Hobbit: The Battle of the Five Armies.

An unrelated song, composed by Shore, called "The Road Goes Ever On..." ("Pt. 1" and "Pt. 2") is both the thirty-fifth and thirty-seventh track of the Complete Recordings. It is a version of the track "The Breaking of the Fellowship" from the 2001 The Lord of the Rings: The Fellowship of the Ring: Original Motion Picture Soundtrack and features the song "In Dreams" sung by Edward Ross and James Wilson. It plays faintly during the ending credits, following "May It Be".

The 2006 Lord of the Rings stage musical includes a song, "The Road Goes On", whose lyrics are loosely based on this poem.
