= The Man in the Moon Stayed Up Too Late =

Poem in The Lord of the Rings

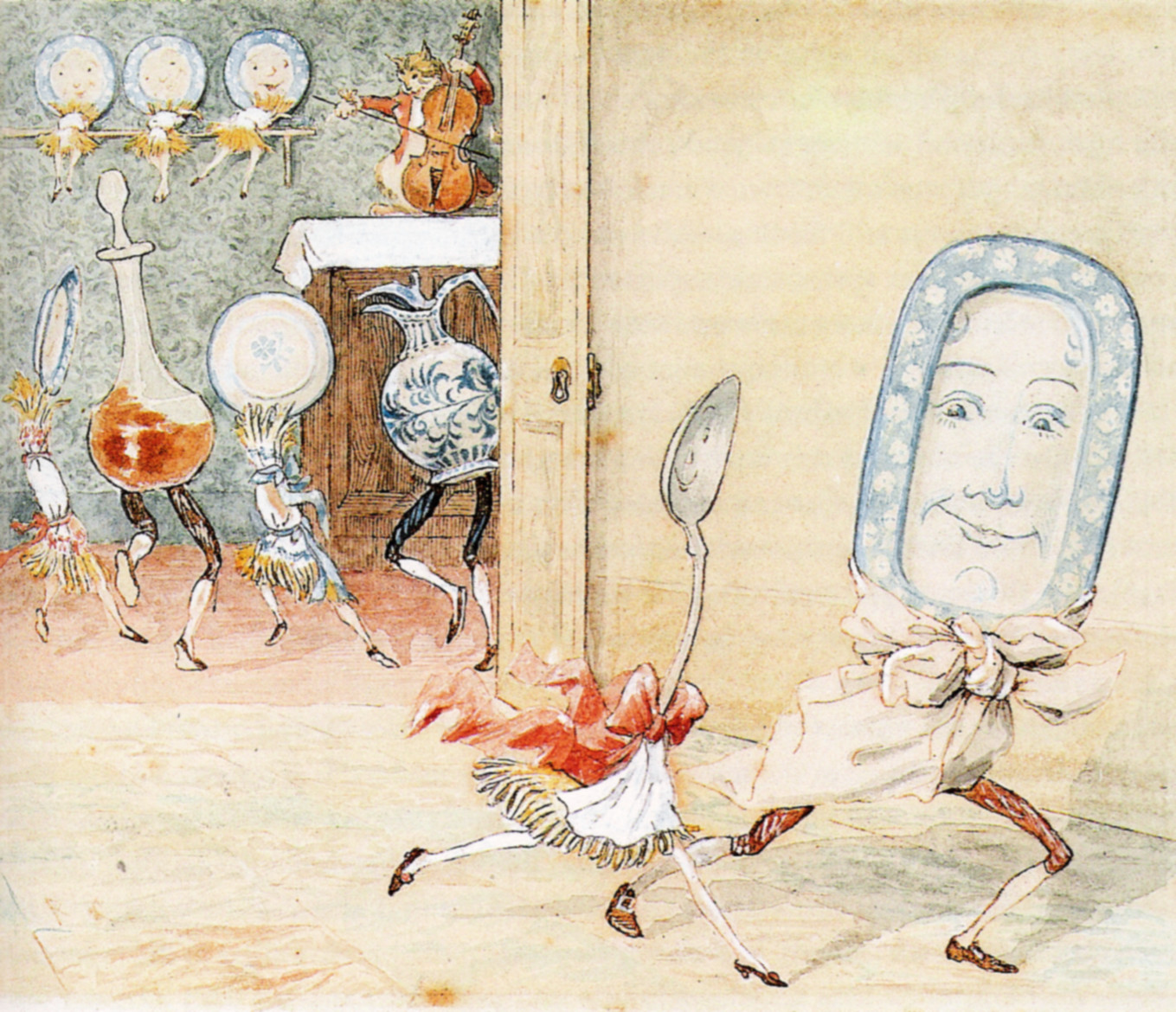
1882 illustration by Randolph Caldecott of the centuries-old nursery rhyme "Hey Diddle Diddle, the Cat and the Fiddle". Tolkien's version features "a tipsy cat that plays a five-stringed fiddle".

"The Man in the Moon Stayed Up Too Late" is J. R. R. Tolkien's imagined original song behind the nursery rhyme "Hey Diddle Diddle (The Cat and the Fiddle)", invented by back-formation. It was first published in Yorkshire Poetry magazine in 1923, and was reused in extended form in the 1954–55 The Lord of the Rings as a song sung by Frodo Baggins in the Prancing Pony inn. The extended version was republished in the 1962 collection The Adventures of Tom Bombadil.

Scholars have noted that Tolkien liked to imitate medieval works, and that the light-hearted poem fits into a reworking by Tolkien of the "Man in the Moon" tradition. This tradition consisted of myths such as that of Phaethon who drove the Sun too close to the Earth, down through a medieval story of the unlucky man who was banished to the Moon, and ultimately to a short nursery rhyme. Tolkien similarly wrote a myth of the creation, with the Sun and Moon carried on ships across the sky; and a story of an Elf who hid on the ship of the Moon, so as to create a multi-layered effect within his writings similar to the real medieval tradition.

The song has been set to music and recorded by The Tolkien Ensemble. In the extended edition of Peter Jackson's 2012 film The Hobbit: An Unexpected Journey, the Dwarf Bofur sings it at Elrond's feast in Rivendell. A rewritten version is sung in Kevin Wallace and Saul Zaentz's 2006 musical theatre production of The Lord of the Rings.

== Context ==
First stanza of
"The Man in the Moon
Came Down Too Soon"

The Man in the Moon had silver shoon
And his beard was of silver thread;
With opals crowned and pearls all bound
about his girdlestead.
In his mantle grey he walked one day
across a shining floor,
And with crystal key in secrecy
he opened an ivory door.

=== Tolkien ===
J. R. R. Tolkien, known as the author of fantasy books on Middle-earth including the bestselling 1937 children's book The Hobbit and the 1954-55 fantasy novel The Lord of the Rings, was a professional philologist, specialising in the understanding of the words used in medieval manuscripts such as Beowulf. He was a professor of English Language at the University of Leeds, and then at the University of Oxford, where he taught at Pembroke College.

Tolkien wrote two Man in the Moon poems, both related to traditional verses. They are "The Man in the Moon Came Down Too Soon" and "The Man in the Moon Stayed Up Too Late", the latter according to Tolkien "derived ultimately from Gondor ... based on the traditions of Men". They are both included in the short collection of Tolkien's verse, The Adventures of Tom Bombadil, with the frame story of being poems enjoyed by hobbits.

Early in The Lord of the Rings, at The Prancing Pony inn at Bree, the protagonist Frodo Baggins jumps on a table and recites "a ridiculous song" supposedly invented by his cousin Bilbo. "Here it is in full", said Tolkien, alluding to the shortness of the nursery rhyme. "Only a few words of it are now, as a rule, remembered." (Note: Tolkien 1954a, book 1, ch. 9 "At the Sign of the Prancing Pony")

The original nursery rhyme

Hey diddle, diddle!
The cat and the fiddle,
The cow jumped over the moon;
The little dog laughed
To see such sport,
And the dish ran away with the spoon.

=== Nursery rhyme ===
The original "Hey Diddle Diddle" nursery rhyme, on which Tolkien's song is based, may date back to the sixteenth century or earlier. Some sources suggest it may be a thousand or more years old: a cat playing a fiddle was a popular image in early medieval illuminated manuscripts.

=== Harley lyrics ===
An unnamed Middle English poem in Harley Manuscript no. 2253 is known under the modern English name "The Man in the Moon". Tolkien was aware of the poem, and may have wanted to connect it in some way to his stories, though he does not use the Middle English poem's central theme, a thornbush. The poem begins:

First stanza of the Middle English "The Man in the Moon"
Harley MS no. 2253

Mon in þe mone stond and strit;
On is bot-forke is burþen he bereþ.
Hit is muche wonder þat he n'adoun slyt—
For doute leste he valle he shoddreþ ant shereþ
When þe forst feseþ, muche chele he byd.
Þe þornes beþ kene—is hattren totereþ.
Nis no wyþt in þe world þat wont wen he syt,
Ne (bote hit bue þe hegge) whet wedes he wereþ.

Translation

The Man in the moon stands and strides
On his hay-fork his burden he bears.
It is a great wonder that he does not slip down—
For fear of falling he shudders and swerves!
When the frost freezes, great cold he suffers.
The thorns are sharp—his clothes [they] tear.
There is no wight in the world that knows when he sits down,
Nor (unless it is the hedgerow) what clothes he wears.

== Song ==
The first two stanzas of
"The Man in the Moon
Stayed Up Too Late"

There is an inn, a merry old inn
beneath an old grey hill,
And there they brew a beer so brown
That the Man in the Moon himself came down
one night to drink his fill.

The ostler has a tipsy cat
that plays a five-stringed fiddle;
And up and down he runs his bow,
Now squeaking high, now purring low,
now sawing in the middle.

The song is written in 13 stanzas. The first five introduce the characters of the Hey diddle diddle nursery rhyme, and add the Man in the Moon and an inn complete with its ostler and landlord. The last eight stanzas embellish the nursery rhyme; the poetry teachers Collette Drifte and Mike Jubb write that Tolkien use them to enliven the tale with "detail, character, and with fun in his mastery of the language".

=== Structure ===
The rhythm is a "jaunty" pattern of iambic feet in the five-line stanzas, in the pattern of 4-3-4-4-3 feet in the lines. The rhyming scheme is UABBA. (Note: Drifte and Jubb omit to mention the unrhymed first line in the rhyming scheme for the 5-line stanzas.) Tolkien makes use of many poetic devices in the poem, such as alliteration, anthropomorphism, assonance, and internal rhyme. Tolkien varies the metre slightly from the strict iambic in "They rolled the Man slowly up the hill". Literary techniques include personification and simile. The "merry old inn" is contrasted with the "grey hill", the cat's fiddle is appropriately "purring low", while the round Man in the Moon is twice described as rolling.

=== Story ===
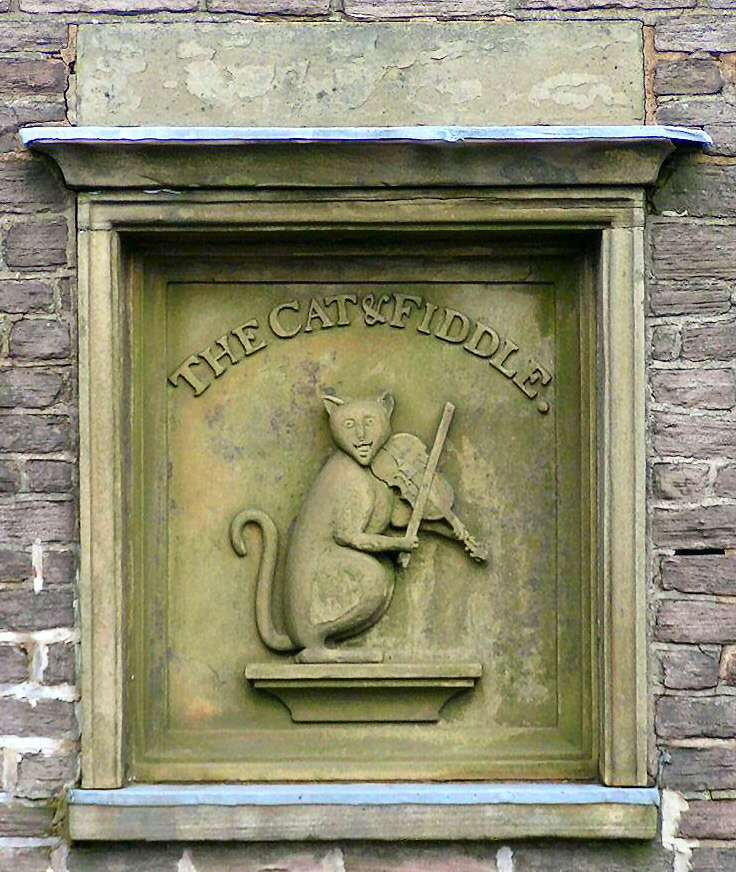
Relief sculpture on wall of the Cat and Fiddle public house. The pub name derives from the nursery rhyme.

Tolkien chooses to set the song's story in the context of "a merry old inn" with fine beer to attract the Man in the Moon. The song introduces each element of the original nursery rhyme in turn: the Man in the Moon in the first stanza, the musical cat in the second, the little dog in the third, the hornéd cow in the fourth, and the silver dishes and spoons in the fifth.

The story proper begins with the sixth stanza, with the Man in the Moon "drinking deep" and the cat wailing. Now is the moment for the dish and the spoon to dance "on the table", as the cow and the little dog start rushing about. Stanza seven sees the Man in the Moon drink another mug of ale, and fall asleep "beneath his chair". This is the cue for the ostler to tell his "tipsy cat" that the Man in the Moon needs to be woken up, and in the ninth stanza, the cat "on his fiddle played hey-diddle-diddle, a jig that would wake the dead" and the landlord tries without success to wake the dozing Man.

Abandoning the attempt, they instead roll the Man back "up the hill" into the Moon, followed by the dish who "ran up with a spoon". The cat plays faster and faster, and all the inn's guests barring the Man himself "bounded from their beds" and danced. Stanza twelve sees the cat's frenzied playing break the fiddle's strings, and "the little dog laughed to see such fun" while "the Saturday dish went off at a run / with the silver Sunday spoon", expanding upon the last of the original nursery rhyme's words. Finally, the Moon rolls "behind the hill" as the Sun rises, astonished to see everyone going back to bed.

=== Publication history ===
The 1923 version was written long before either of Tolkien's hobbit novels, The Hobbit (1937) and The Lord of the Rings, were planned. This version was called "The Cat and the Fiddle: or A Nursery Rhyme Undone and its Scandalous Secret Unlocked".

The version of the song printed in The Lord of the Rings is slightly longer, at thirteen ballad-like five-line stanzas. Shippey writes that Tolkien was in effect "raiding his own larder" for suitable materials. This version was republished, with a new title, in The Adventures of Tom Bombadil. (Note: The Return of the Shadow, ch. 8 "Arrival at Bree", pp. 141-147)

== Reception ==
=== An imagined prehistory of poetry ===
The Tolkien scholar Tom Shippey notes that nobody would call "The Man in the Moon Stayed Up Too Late" a serious poem. All the same, he cites it and its mate, "The Man in the Moon Came Down Too Soon" (also from 1923, also subsequently included in The Adventures of Tom Bombadil), as typical examples of Tolkien's working strategy for reconstructing philological information about sources now lost. In this case, the question is what the history is behind the abbreviated version of this poem that survives as a well-known but nonsensical nursery rhyme. By imagining a text that might reasonably have left the surviving rhyme, one can deduce clues that might have left other artefacts in surviving literature. Shippey argues that many of the scenarios in Tolkien's more serious work are similar recreations ("'asterisk' poems" in Shippey's phrase), attempting to explain abstruse passages in surviving Old English and Old Norse texts. The seemingly frivolous nursery rhymes are taken to have

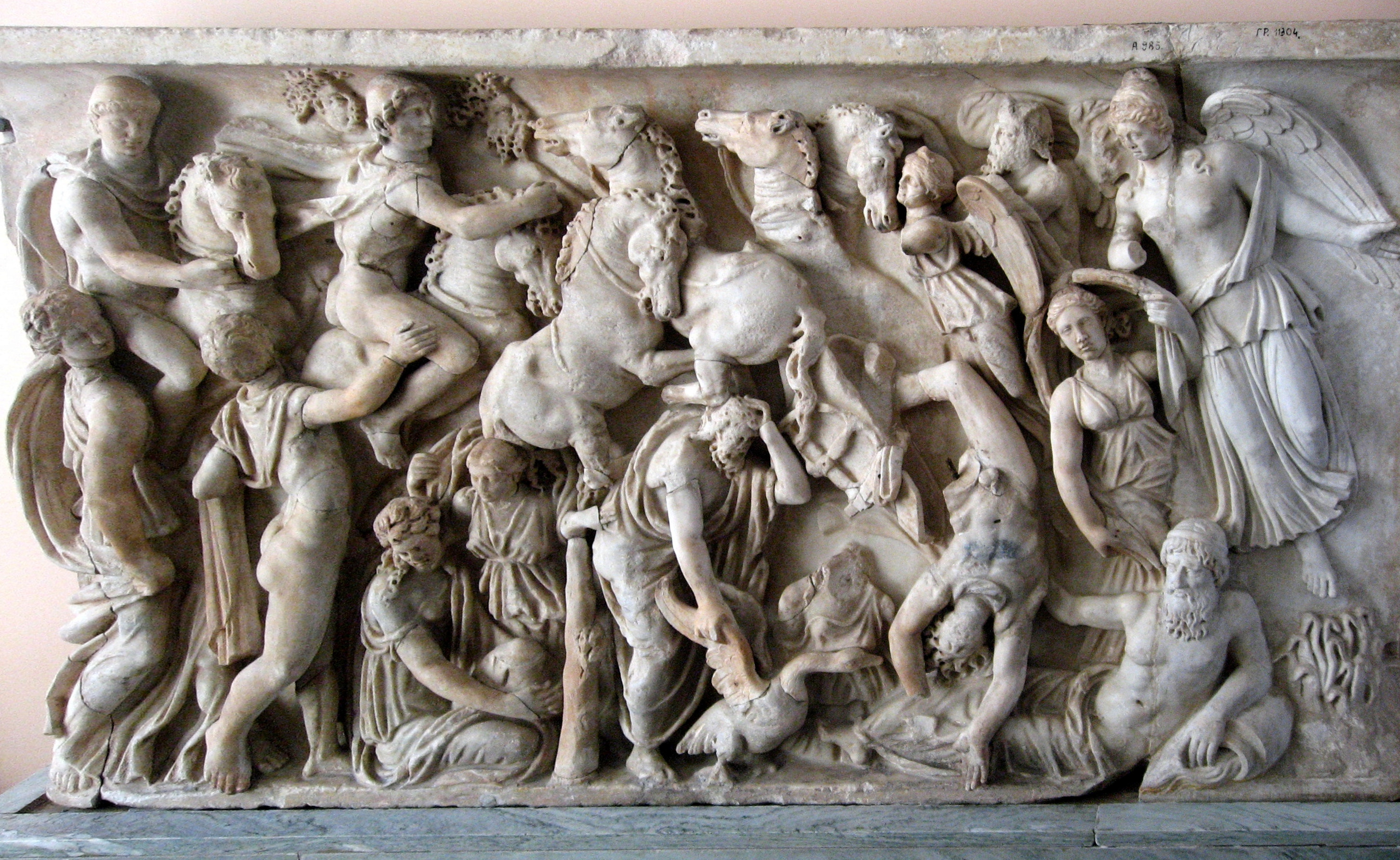
Scholars have compared the song to Moon and Sun stories at different levels, all the way back to the Greek myth of Phaethon who brought the Sun too close to the Earth. Roman sarcophagus depicting the fall of Phaethon.

contain[ed], at least in their early versions, hints of mythological significance – the Man in the Moon who fails to drive his chariot while mortals panic and his white horses champ their silver bits and the Sun comes up to overtake him is not totally unlike the Greek myth of Phaethon, who drove the horses of the sun too close to Earth and scorched it.

Steven M. Deyo, in Mythlore, endorses Shippey's suggestion of an imagined prehistory of the nursery rhyme, where

If one assumes a long tradition of 'idle children' repeating 'thoughtless tales' in increasing confusion, one might think that poems like Tolkien's were the remote ancestors of the modern rhymes.

=== Performance versus folklore transmission ===
The Tolkien scholar Dimitra Fimi writes that Tolkien is clearly setting Frodo's song apart as a performance of a traditional work. She states that readers quickly appreciate that Frodo's performance of an entertaining but "ridiculous song", supposedly written by his cousin Bilbo, is evidently "a highly sophisticated and literary derivative of the 'real world' nursery rhyme 'The Cat and the Fiddle'". This stands in sharp contrast with Sam Gamgee's recital of "The Stone Troll", at once amusing and "metrically intricate", which the other hobbits make clear is new. It is clear, writes Fimi, that Sam, despite his basic education, must have created it; it has "the rare quality of impromptu improvisation modelled upon traditional forms, a quality that many traditional folksingers display".

=== Multi-layered tradition ===
The medievalist Thomas Honegger writes that Tolkien gives the theme of the Man in the Moon a "multi-layered treatment" that gives it a "complexity and depth" comparable with the actual folk tradition that reaches back some eight centuries, spanning the 14th-century Middle English "Man in the Moon" poem in the Harley Lyrics, which he quotes at length with a parallel translation. The "nonsensical nursery rhymes" about the Man in the Moon inspired Tolkien's two poems ("... Stayed Up Too Late" and "... Came Down Too Soon"). Honegger comments that Christopher Tolkien seems to have been uncomfortable, even embarrassed, by the "low" folklore aspect of his father's Man in the Moon poetry, though his father, far from feeling discomfort, was happy to hint at a long and varied tradition through his stories and poems. (Note: Tolkien 1984, pp. 193, 202, 206) At the "high mythology" level, he writes, the Old Norse myth of Máni corresponds to Tolkien's creation myths with the ships which carry Sun and Moon (Tilion) across the heavens. At the level of story, the tale of an unlucky fellow banished to the moon roughly matches (Honegger writes) Tolkien's old elf Uole Kuvion who hid on the Ship of the Moon "and has been living there ever since". (Note: Tolkien 1977, ch. 11 "Of the Sun and Moon and the Hiding of Valinor")

Honegger's analysis of Tolkien's reworking of the Man in the Moon tradition
Type	Literary mode	Tolkien	Classical and Medieval
Myth	Mythic	Creation, ships carry Sun and Moon across sky	Greek myth of Phaethon; Old Norse myth of Máni
Story	High mimetic	Elf Uole Kuvion who hid on Ship of the Moon	Unlucky man banished to Moon
Rhyme	Low mimetic	"The Man in the Moon Stayed Up Too Late"	"Hey Diddle Diddle"

=== Medieval borrowings ===
John D. Rateliff notes that Tolkien stated that when he read a medieval work, he wanted to write a modern one in the same tradition. He constantly created these, whether pastiches and parodies like "Fastitocalon"; adaptations in medieval metres, like "The Lay of Aotrou and Itroun" or "asterisk texts" like his "The Cat & The Fiddle"; and finally "new wine in old bottles" such as "The Nameless Land" and Aelfwine's Annals. The works are extremely varied, but all are "suffused with medieval borrowings", making them, writes Rateliff, "most readers' portal into medieval literature". Not all found use in Middle-earth (as "The Cat & The Fiddle" eventually did), but they all helped Tolkien develop a medieval-style craft that enabled him to create his attractively authentic Middle-earth legendarium. Hyde writes that the poem was at first a humorous commentary on the plentiful "'nonsense' that had been written" about "The Cat and the Fiddle".

== Settings ==
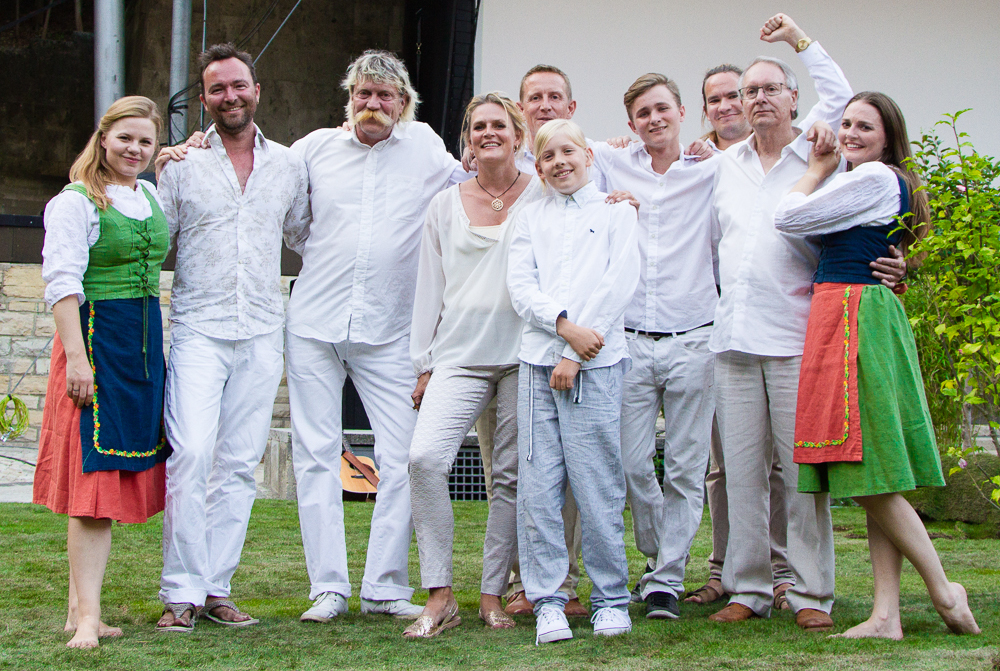
In 1997 the Tolkien Ensemble performed the song in a setting by ensemble members Caspar Reiff and Peter Hall.

The Danish Tolkien Ensemble recorded the song on their 1997 CD of settings of songs from The Lord of the Rings, An Evening in Rivendell. It was set by Caspar Reiff and Peter Hall. Af Søren Aabyen, reviewing the album for the Danish Tolkien Association, praised the "playful hobbit-song". Steve Renard recorded his version online for Signum University, with sheet music.

Peter Jackson does not have Frodo sing the song in his film of The Fellowship of the Ring, but in the extended edition of the 2012 film The Hobbit: An Unexpected Journey, the Dwarf Bofur sings it at Elrond's feast in Rivendell.

In Kevin Wallace and Saul Zaentz's 2006 musical theatre production of The Lord of the Rings, presented in Toronto and London, the hobbits Frodo, Merry, Pippin, Sam, and the Breelanders sing a version of the song as "The Cat and the Moon", cut down to 4-line stanzas with a different metre. Shaun McKenna's lyrics were set to music by A. R. Rahman as the fourth musical number, and performed by the Finnish band Värttinä.

First stanzas
"The Man in the Moon Stayed Up Too Late"
J. R. R. Tolkien

There is an inn, a merry old inn
beneath an old grey hill,
And there they brew a beer so brown
That the Man in the Moon himself came down
one night to drink his fill.

"The Cat and the Moon"
Shaun McKenna

There's an inn of old renown
Where they brew a beer so brown
Moon came rolling down the hill
One Hevnsday night to drink his fill.
