= Treebeard =

Tree-giant in The Lord of the Rings

- Middle-earth character
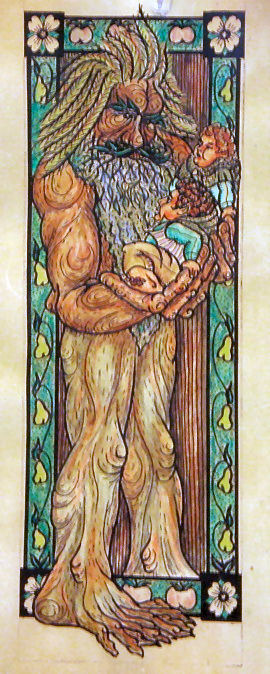
- Treebeard and Hobbits; 2007 depiction by Tom Loback
- First appearance: The Two Towers (1954)

In-universe information
- Aliases: Fangorn; The Ent
- Race: Ent

Fangorn Forest
- Middle-earth location

In-universe information
- Other name: Entwood
- Type: Thick, dense forest Home of the Ents and Huorns; The remnant of a larger ancient forest
- Ruled by: Treebeard
- Locations: Wellinghall, Derndingle, Treebeard's hill, the Entwash
- Location: south-west Wilderland

Treebeard, or Fangorn in Sindarin, is a tree-giant character in J. R. R. Tolkien's The Lord of the Rings. He is an Ent and is said by Gandalf to be "the oldest living thing that still walks beneath the Sun upon this Middle-earth." (Note: Tolkien 1954, book 3, ch. 4 "Treebeard") He lives in the ancient Forest of Fangorn, to which he has given his name. It lies at the southern end of the Misty Mountains. He is described as being at least 14 feet (4.5 m) in height.

In The Two Towers, Treebeard meets with Merry Brandybuck and Pippin Took, two Hobbits of the Shire. This meeting proves to have consequences that contribute significantly to the story and enables the events that occur in The Return of the King.

== Fangorn's forest ==
The Forest of Fangorn was at the south-eastern end of the Misty Mountains near the Gap of Rohan. The mountains formed the western border of Fangorn. At the end of the mountain range stood Saruman's stronghold of Isengard near the southwestern corner of the forest. To the east and south of Fangorn was the land of Rohan, and Lothlórien lay to the north and slightly east. Fangorn Forest stretched for many miles and held many paths. (Note: The Lord of the Rings Map: "The West of Middle-earth at the End of the Third Age")

Two significant rivers ran through the forest. To the north the Limlight flowed from the woods and then formed the northern border of Rohan. The river then merged into the larger Anduin. In the south, the Entwash spread deep into the forest arriving from Methedras, a mountainous region located near the Misty Mountains. The river then flowed through Rohan to the great river, the Anduin. The valley of Derndingle was to the south-west. There was a path where the Entwash passed into a region called Wellinghall with one of Treebeard's homes.

Fangorn Forest was said to be humid, and trunks and branches of many kinds of tree grew thick, allowing little light to penetrate. Huorns also lived deep within the forest, like Ents but more discreet. The Ents and Huorns drank from the river Entwash, and from it the Ents brewed their legendary drink, the Ent-draughts.

== Fictional biography ==
Ents were created in the Elder Days to be the "Shepherds of the Trees" and protect trees from the anticipated destruction that Dwarves would cause. In The Lord of the Rings, Treebeard recounts to the hobbits Merry and Pippin how the Ents were "awakened" and taught to speak by the Elves. He says that only three Ents remain from the Elder Days: himself, Leaflock and Skinbark. He recalls when he could walk through the woods of Middle-earth for days. He sings a song about roaming the woods of Middle-earth, naming regions of Beleriand which were destroyed in the war with Morgoth and now lie "beneath the waves." He says there are valleys in Fangorn forest where the Great Darkness, the period of Morgoth's rule before the arising of the Moon and Sun, never lifted, and the trees are older than he.

Treebeard is described in some detail:

"They found they were looking at a most extraordinary face. It belonged to a large man-like, almost Troll-like, figure, at least fourteen foot high, very sturdy, with a tall head, and hardly any neck. Whether it was clad in stuff like green and grey bark, or whether that was its hide, was difficult to say. At any rate the arms, at a short distance from the trunk, were not wrinkled, but covered with a brown smooth skin. The large feet had seven toes each. The lower part of the long face was covered with a sweeping grey beard, bushy, almost twiggy at the roots, thin and mossy at the ends. But at the moment the hobbits noted little but the eyes. These deep eyes were now surveying them, slow and solemn, but very penetrating. They were brown, shot with a green light."

Treebeard learns that the hobbits think that Gandalf is dead, though apparently he knows otherwise. He takes them to a place called Wellinghall, where the hobbits tell him their adventures and of Saruman's treachery. Treebeard replies that there is "something very big going on, that I can see", and comments that the hobbits "seem to be caught up in a great storm."

Treebeard muses, "I must do something, I suppose." He recalls although he told Saruman many things, Saruman never told him anything. He realizes that Saruman is plotting to be "a Power", and wonders what evil he is really doing: why has Saruman taken up with Orcs, why there are so many Orcs in his woods, and why these Orcs are able to bear sunlight. He is angered by trees being felled "to feed the fires of Orthanc". He overcomes his anger and then, thinking aloud, begins to make plans for the next day, and tells Merry and Pippin about the Entwives.

The next day, Treebeard announces that he has been busy, and they will drink and then go to the Entmoot, a gathering of Ents. He carries them there; the gathering lasts three days. It ends with all the Ents shouting, and then singing a marching song and striding to Isengard with Treebeard in the lead: "the last march of the Ents", as Treebeard calls it. Huorns follow, marching, as they later discover, to the Battle of Helm's Deep.

The Ents arrive at Isengard as Saruman's army is leaving, and they wait until it has gone. Treebeard bangs on the gates and shouts for Saruman to come forth. Saruman refuses, and the Ents attack. They reduce the outer walls to rubble and destroy much of what is inside. Treebeard gets the Ents to divert the river Isen, drowning the ruined fortress and its underground furnaces and workshops. Saruman is left in the impregnable tower, surrounded by water and watchful Ents. (Note: Tolkien 1954, book 3, ch. 9 "Flotsam and Jetsam")

A delegation led by Gandalf arrives at Isengard and, except for Gandalf, are amazed that it has been destroyed. Treebeard promises that Saruman will remain in the tower. (Note: Tolkien 1954, book 3, ch. 8 "The Road to Isengard")

Treebeard is still at Isengard, now renamed the Treegarth of Orthanc, when a group led by Aragorn, King of Gondor, arrives after the victory over Sauron, made possible partly because the Ents had helped to destroy Saruman's forces. Treebeard admits that he had let Saruman go. Gandalf gently chastises him, saying that Saruman might have persuaded Treebeard to let him go by "the poison of his voice." Treebeard delivers the keys of Orthanc to the King, who gives the valley of Orthanc to Treebeard and his ents. (Note: Tolkien 1955, book 6, ch. 6 "Many Partings")

== In-fiction origins ==
In Sindarin, one of Tolkien's Elvish languages, "Fangorn" is a compound of fanga, "beard", and orne, "tree", so it is the equivalent of the English "Treebeard". The Riders of Rohan called Fangorn Forest the "Entwood", the wood of the Ents. Treebeard gave it various names in Quenya, another Elvish language: "Ambaróna" means "uprising, sunrise, orient" from amba, "upwards" and róna, "east". "Aldalómë" means "tree twilight" from alda, "tree" and lómë, "dusk, twilight". (Note: Tolkien 1977, Appendix: "Elements in Quenya and Sindarin Names") "Tauremorna" means "gloomy forest" from taur, "forest", and morna, "gloomy". "Tauremornalómë" means "gloomy twilight forest".

== Analysis ==
=== Medieval echoes ===
The word "Ent" was taken from the Old English ent or eoten, meaning "giant". Tolkien borrowed the word from a phrase in the Anglo-Saxon poems The Ruin and Maxims II, orþanc enta geweorc ("cunning work of giants"), which describes Roman ruins in Britain. (Note: Carpenter 2023, #163 to W. H. Auden, 7 June 1955)

The philologist and Tolkien scholar Tom Shippey notes that Treebeard says farewell to the elf-rulers Celeborn and Galadriel "with great reverence" and the words "It is long, long since we met by stock or by stone", in words which echo a line in the Middle English poem Pearl: "We meten so selden by stok other stone". Where in Pearl the mention of stock and stone means in earthy reality, Shippey writes, the phrase fits the Fangorn context well, since Treebeard's "sense of ultimate loss naturally centres on felled trees and barren ground."

=== Environmentalism ===
Matthew T. Dickerson and Jonathan Evans see Treebeard as vocalizing a vital part of Tolkien's environmental ethic, the need to preserve and look after every kind of wild place, especially forests. Tolkien's biographer John Garth writes that "A deep feeling for trees is Tolkien's most distinctive response to the natural world."

=== Professorial figure ===
Shippey, who like Tolkien had been a university professor, writes that Fangorn's explanations are "authoritative and indeed .. 'professorial'. They admit no denial." Tolkien's biographer, Humphrey Carpenter, wrote that Treebeard's deep booming voice with his "hrum, hoom" mannerism was based on that of Tolkien's friend, fellow-Inkling, and professor of English at the University of Oxford, C. S. Lewis.

== Portrayal in adaptations ==
Treebeard, as portrayed in Ralph Bakshi's The Lord of the Rings

Treebeard has inspired artists and illustrators such as Inger Edelfeldt, John Howe, Ted Nasmith, Anke Eißmann, and Alan Lee. In Ralph Bakshi's 1978 animated adaptation of The Lord of the Rings, John Westbrook provided the voice of Treebeard. Stephen Thorne voiced the character in BBC Radio's 1981 serialization.

Treebeard (voiced by John Rhys-Davies) in Peter Jackson's The Lord of the Rings: The Two Towers

In Peter Jackson's films The Lord of the Rings: The Two Towers (2002) and The Lord of the Rings: The Return of the King (2003), Treebeard is a combination of a large animatronic model and a CGI construct; his voice is performed by John Rhys-Davies, who also portrays Gimli. Jackson's interpretation of Treebeard makes him far more suspicious of the Hobbits (as possible Orcs) than Tolkien does, and far more reluctant to go to war with Saruman until he sees the damage done to the forest.

A 6-metre-high sculpture of Treebeard by Tolkien's great-nephew Tim Tolkien received planning permission in Birmingham, where Tolkien grew up. On The Tolkien Ensemble's album At Dawn in Rivendell, Treebeard is voiced by Christopher Lee.

== Sources ==
- Carpenter, Humphrey (1977). J. R. R. Tolkien: A Biography. New York: Ballantine Books. ISBN 978-0-04-928037-3.
- Carpenter, Humphrey, ed. (2023) [1981]. The Letters of J. R. R. Tolkien: Revised and Expanded Edition. New York: HarperCollins. ISBN 978-0-35-865298-4.
- Dickerson, Matthew T.; Evans, Jonathan (2006) [2004]. Ents, Elves, and Eriador: The Environmental Vision of J. R. R. Tolkien. University Press of Kentucky. ISBN 0-8131-7159-8.
- Garth, John (2020). "Tree-woven Lands". The Worlds of J.R.R. Tolkien: The Places that Inspired Middle-earth. London: Frances Lincoln Publishers. pp. 112–131. ISBN 978-0-71124-127-5.
- Lobdell, Jared (1975). A Tolkien Compass. La Salle, Illinois: Open Court. ISBN 978-0-87548-316-0.
- Shippey, Tom (2005) [1982]. The Road to Middle-Earth: How J. R. R. Tolkien Created a New Mythology (Third ed.). HarperCollins. ISBN 978-0-261-10275-0.
- Tolkien, J. R. R. (1954). The Two Towers. The Lord of the Rings. Boston: Houghton Mifflin. OCLC 1042159111.
- Tolkien, J. R. R. (1955). The Return of the King. The Lord of the Rings. Boston: Houghton Mifflin. OCLC 519647821.
- Tolkien, J. R. R. (1977). Christopher Tolkien (ed.). The Silmarillion. Boston: Houghton Mifflin. ISBN 978-0-395-25730-2.
- Tolkien, J. R. R. (1987). Christopher Tolkien (ed.). The Lost Road and Other Writings. Boston: Houghton Mifflin. ISBN 0-395-45519-7.
