= The McCalmans =

Scottish folk band

- Origin: Scotland
- Genres: Folk music
- Years active: 1964–2010
- Past members: Ian McCalman; Derek Moffat; Hamish Bayne; Nick Keir; Stephen Quigg

The McCalmans (originally The Ian MacCalman Folk Group) were a Scottish folk trio. Formed on 6 October 1964, they recorded and toured without interruption until they disbanded in December 2010. Their performance was based on three part harmony, humour and a deep love and respect for the folk tradition in Scotland. They performed all over Europe, and in the United States, Canada, Australia, New Zealand, Bermuda, Kenya, Cyprus, Belize and the Falkland Islands. They had six television series and BBC Network Radio series and appearances.

The original trio was formed by Ian McCalman (born 1 September 1946, in Edinburgh) on his first day at Edinburgh College of Art, where he, Derek Moffat (born near Dundee) and Hamish Bayne (born in Nairobi, Kenya) were studying architecture. Bayne left the band in 1982 and was replaced by Nick Keir. Moffat died as a result of cancer in 2001, and was replaced by long-term friend of the band, Stephen Quigg. The group disbanded in 2010, when McCalman decided to retire from touring. He now runs a recording studio. Keir and Quigg continued to tour together until Keir's death in 2013.

== Discography ==
- All in One Mind (as The Ian MacCalman Folk Group; 1968)
- Singers Three (1969)
- Turn Again (1970)
- No Strings Attached (1971)
- An Audience with the McCalmans (1973)
- Smuggler (1975)
- House Full (1976)
- Side By Side By Side (1977)
- Burn The Witch (1978)
- The Best of (1979)
- The Ettrick Shepherd (1980)
- At Your Service (1980)
- Bonnie Bands Again (1982)
- Ancestral Manoeuvres (1984)
- Scottish Songs (1986)
- Peace and Plenty (1986)
- Listen to the Heat (1988)
- Flames on The Water (1990)
- Songs From Scotland (1991)
- Honest Poverty (1993)
- In Harmony (1994)
- Festival Lights (1995)
- High Ground (1997)
- Keepers (1999)
- Hard Night's Day (2000)
- Where The Sky Meets The Sea (2002)
- Tangled Web (2004)
- Scots Abroad (2006)
- Coming Home (2009)
- The Greentrax Years (2010)
- Lost Tracks (2016)
