= Nick Keir =

Scottish musician (1953–2013)

- Born: 14 March 1953; Edinburgh, Scotland
- Died: 2 June 2013 (aged 60)
- Genres: Folk
- Occupations: Musician, singer-songwriter
- Formerly of: Finn McCuill The McCalmans The Tolkien Ensemble
- Website: nickkeir.com

Nick Keir (14 March 1953 – 2 June 2013) was a Scottish musician from Edinburgh, Scotland, who is best known for his work with The McCalmans. More recently Keir emerged as a singer-songwriter, producing three solo albums and performing as a soloist with The Tolkien Ensemble. Keir regularly played in both Scotland and Denmark at folk festivals and on tours, both with The McCalmans and also at solo gigs.

Keir studied at Stirling University, where he founded Finn MacCuill, a folk-rock band, which for a while expanded into The Finn MacCuill Folkshow, a small touring theatre group, for which he wrote the scripts. In the late 1970s, Keir joined 7:84 Theatre Company Scotland as a writer and musician, and soon after joined The McCalmans Folk Group.

Keir later played with Stephen Quigg (a former member of The McCalmans) in a duo as well as being a soloist. Other collaborations included work on The Complete Works of Robert Tannahill and appearing regularly with the Holbaek Ensemble in Denmark in a programme of Scots and Baroque Music. Keir mostly played the acoustic guitar and the penny whistle, although he was proficient in many other instruments.

Keir died of cancer on 2 June 2013 at the age of 60, after being diagnosed the year previously. A compilation album of his greatest hits was released in 2017 to commemorate his life and career.

== Discography ==
- Finn mac Cuill (1975) Finn mac Cuill. REL Records
- Sink Ye Swim Ye (1977) Finn mac Cuill. REL Records
- Rumours of Snow (2000) Laverock Records LRK1
- All Over This Town (2004) Laverock Records LRK2
- Fishing Up the Moon (2008) Laverock Records LRK3
- The Edge of Night (2012) Laverock Records LRK4
- Nick Keir 1953-2013 (2017) Greentrax CDTRAX397
