= Danish Chamber Orchestra =

Chamber orchestra in Denmark

- Orchestra
- Native name: Danmarks Underholdningsorkester
- Former name: Danish National Chamber Orchestra (1939–2014)
- Founded: 1927; 98 years ago
- Location: Copenhagen, Denmark
- Website: Official website

The Danish Chamber Orchestra (Danish: Danmarks Underholdningsorkester) is a chamber orchestra in Denmark. It was the Danish National Chamber Orchestra (Note: It had several names in Danish: DR Underholdningsorkestret (also stylised as DR UnderholdningsOrkestret, with camelCase), RadioUnderholdningsOrkestret (or RUO for short), or; Radioens Underholdningsorkester.) from 1939 to 2014, when it was under the Danish Broadcasting Corporation (DR). Since 2015, it has been funded privately.

== History ==
The roots of the orchestra date back to 1927, with the formation of an orchestra to perform light music at the Hotel Phoenix by Louis Preil. By 1933, Louis Preils Danseorkester (Louis Preil's Dance Orchestra) consisted of 22 musicians and attained great popularity in Denmark via radio transmissions. In 1939, DR then formally established the DR Underholdningsorkester (lit. "Danish Radio Entertainment Orchestra") as the national broadcaster's in-house orchestra. It focused on lighter, popular repertoire. Teddy Petersen took over direction of the ensemble in 1943.

The repertoire of the orchestra included classical repertoire such as Mozart, to modern musicals and more recently, collaborations with rock groups. During the tenure of chief conductor Ádám Fischer, which began in 1999, the orchestra made a number of commercial recordings of symphonies and operas by Mozart. As of 2014, the orchestra numbered 42 performers.

In September 2014, DR announced the disbanding of the orchestra, effective 1 January 2015, citing budget cutbacks. Protests at the decision resulted, including objections to the haste of the decision by the DR board of directors, and that the Minister of Culture, Marianne Jelved, had authorised the dismantling before the orchestra had the opportunity to present a savings plan to allow it to continue. The orchestra gave its final performance as a DR ensemble on 21 November 2014, with a performance of Beethoven's Symphony No. 9.

The musicians of the orchestra then began a crowdfunding campaign to keep the orchestra in existence. Via Kickstarter, this campaign raised 1,000,000 DKK in funds from private individuals, and several Danish corporations pledged the remaining 2,000,000 DKK. Because of Kickstarter's single-donation limits (50,000 DKK), the orchestra was required to cancel its Kickstarter account, to return those donations, and to request that donors re-submit their donations in cash by 28 February 2015.

After ending its affiliation with DR, the orchestra renamed itself the Danmarks Underholdningsorkester (lit. "Danish Entertainment Orchestra"), and its English official name dropped the word "national", becoming "Danish Chamber Orchestra". It gave its first concert as a privately funded ensemble on 1 February 2015 at the Royal Danish Academy of Music.
