= A Elbereth Gilthoniel =

Poem in the Elvish language Sindarin

A Elbereth Gilthoniel is an Elvish hymn to Varda (Sindarin: Elbereth) in J. R. R. Tolkien's The Lord of the Rings. It is the longest piece of Sindarin in The Lord of the Rings. It is not translated in the main text where it is first presented.

The poem, written in iambic tetrameters, has been likened to a Roman Catholic Marian hymn. Among the musical renderings of the poem, the earliest is Donald Swann's, published in his song cycle The Road Goes Ever On, while The Tolkien Ensemble recorded four different renditions.

== Text ==
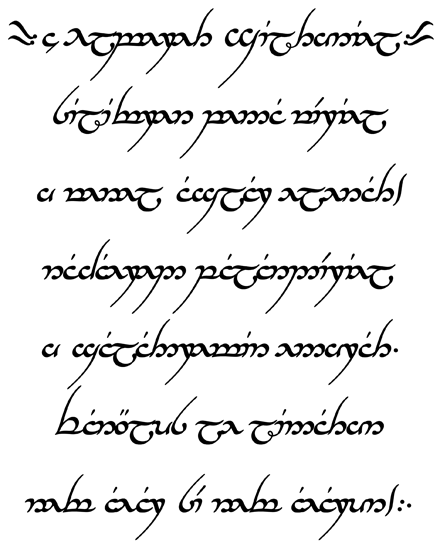
The first stanza of the long version of "A Elbereth Gilthoniel", written in Tengwar script (Note: Tolkien & Swann 2002, pp. 29–31 (Swann's sheet music), 72–75 (Tolkien's guide to pronunciation and meaning), CD inside rear cover (recording, sung by William Elvin). The Tengwar is illustrated on the dust jacket.)

There are three versions of this iambic tetrameter hymn, the first of which is the largest portion of Sindarin in The Lord of the Rings: (Note: Tolkien 1954a, book 1, ch. 3 "Three is Company") (Note: Tolkien 1954a, book 2, ch. 1 "Many Meetings") (Note: Tolkien 1954, book 4, ch. 10 "The Choices of Master Samwise")

Sindarin

A Elbereth Gilthoniel
silivren penna míriel
o menel aglar elenath!
Na-chaered palan-díriel
o galadhremmin ennorath,
Fanuilos, le linnathon
nef aear, sí nef aearon!

A Elbereth Gilthoniel
o menel palan-díriel,
le nallon sí di'nguruthos!
A tiro nin, Fanuilos!

Translation:
English

O Elbereth Starkindler,
white-glittering, slanting falls, sparkling like jewels,
from the firmament the glory of the starry host!
Having gazed afar into remote distance
from the tree-tangled Middle-lands,
Everwhite, to thee I will chant
on this side of the ocean, here on this side of the Great Ocean!

O Elbereth Starkindler,
from heaven gazing afar,
to thee I cry here beneath the shadow of death!
O look towards me, Everwhite!

== Analysis ==
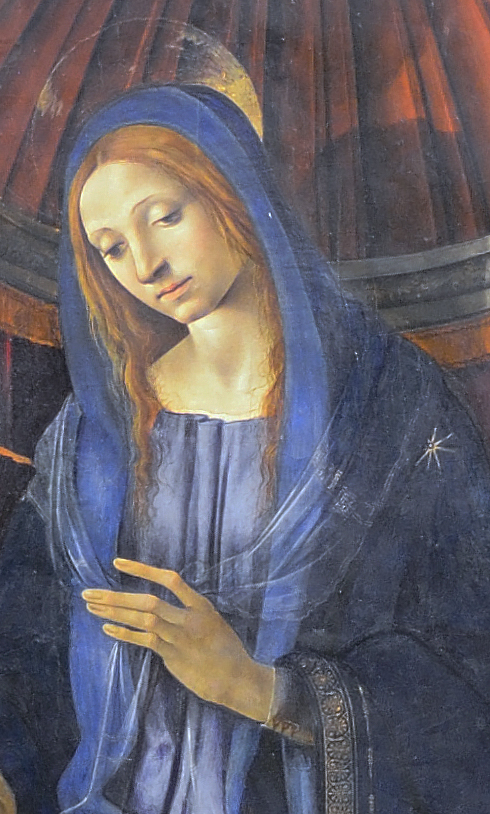
Scholars have remarked the resemblance of Tolkien's song to Elbereth to Catholic veneration of the Virgin Mary. Detail of Madonna with child by Filippo Lippi

In Tolkien's legendarium, Varda (Sindarin: Elbereth) is one of the godlike Valar and the highest of the "guardians". Peter Kreeft sees her as one of the clearest reflections of Roman Catholic devotion to the Virgin Mary in Tolkien's work.

In A Elbereth Gilthoniel, scholars such as Marjorie Burns and Stratford Caldecott see an echo of John Lingard's Marian hymn, Hail Queen of Heaven, the Ocean Star. Caldecott commented that "Tolkien would have been familiar with one of the most popular Catholic hymns from his childhood, the tone and mood of which are markedly close to those of Tolkien's song to Elbereth."

The hymn is not translated in The Lord of the Rings, though it is described:

the sweet syllables of the elvish song fell like clear jewels of blended word and melody. 'It is a song to Elbereth', said Bilbo,

and at the very end of the chapter there is a hint as to its meaning:

'Good night! I'll take a walk, I think, and look at the stars of Elbereth in the garden. Sleep well!'

A translation appeared much later, in the song-cycle The Road Goes Ever On, and it indeed concerns Elbereth and the stars. Readers, then, were not expected to know the song's literal meaning, but they were meant to make something of it: as the Tolkien scholar Tom Shippey says, it is clearly something from an unfamiliar language, and it announces that "there is more to Middle-earth than can immediately be communicated". In addition, Tolkien believed, contrary to most of his contemporaries, that the sounds of language gave a specific pleasure that the listener could perceive as beauty; he personally found the sounds of Gothic and Finnish, and to some extent also of Welsh, immediately beautiful. In short, as Shippey writes, Tolkien "believed that untranslated elvish would do a job that English could not". Shippey suggests that readers do take something important from a song in another language, namely the feeling or style that it conveys, even if "it escapes a cerebral focus".

The philologist Helge Fauskanger provides a word-by-word analysis of the hymn. He includes a comparison with Sam Gamgee's exclamation "in a language which he did not know", A Elbereth Gilthoniel o menel palan-diriel, le nallon / sí di-nguruthos! A tiro nin, Fanuilos! He notes that Tolkien translates and briefly comments on it in a letter. (Note: Carpenter 2023, letter 278 to C. Kilby, October 1965)

== Musical settings ==
In 1967, Donald Swann published a musical rendition in the score of his song cycle The Road Goes Ever On, where it forms the second part of the setting of "I Sit beside the Fire". He and William Elvin recorded it on an LP record, which included a recording of Tolkien reading the prayer. The Road Goes Ever On was republished in 1978, 1993, and 2002, and the recording was released as a CD in 1993, but it omitted Tolkien's reading.

The BBC's 1981 radio dramatisation of the Lord of the Rings included a version composed by Stephen Oliver which was released as the second track of the soundtrack album, which itself is included in some commercial versions of the BBC's production.

In 2006, The Tolkien Ensemble and Christopher Lee released a collection of previously released songs, The Lord of the Rings: Complete Songs and Poems. This included four different musical renditions of the poem. One of these, marked as number III (on their album At Dawn in Rivendell), is the complete poem; it is sung by Signe Asmussen, a mezzo-soprano.

A rendition composed by David Long with Plan 9 is briefly heard in the Extended Edition of The Lord of the Rings: The Fellowship of the Ring, where Sam and Frodo encounter "wood elves" who are singing the hymn while leaving Middle-earth. The complete song ("Passing of the Elves" / "Elvish Lament") is included in The Complete Recordings edition of the soundtrack for the film.

The Australian composer Laura Bishop composed her own rendition of the hymn. Beginning with a solo by a soprano it then repeats with an SATB choir. The Norwegian classical composer Martin Romberg has set the lyrics to music in his work Eldarinwë Liri for girls' choir, which also includes the four other poems Tolkien wrote in Elven languages. The work premiered in 2010 with the Norwegian Girls Choir and Trio Mediæval at the Vestfold International Festival.
