= Ulrik Cold =

Danish operatic bass (1939–2010)

Ulrik Thestrup Cold (15 May 1939 — 13 October 2010) was a Danish operatic bass. In 1963 he made his professional opera debut at the Copenhagen Student Opera as Seneca in Claudio Monteverdi's L'incoronazione di Poppea. He was born and died in Copenhagen and was active at the Royal Danish Theatre (RDT) for the next several decades and served as the director of the RDT from 1975 to 1977.

He was committed to the Staatstheater Kassel from 1969 to 1971. He has appeared as a guest artist with several major opera houses internationally, including the English National Opera, the San Francisco Opera, and the Wexford Festival Opera.

Ulrich Cold sang the role of Sarastro in the Ingmar Bergman film of The Magic Flute, by Mozart, the role of Gurnemanz in the 1975 recording of Wagner's Parsifal, and the role of Argante in the 1977 recording of Handel's Rinaldo conducted by Jean-Claude Malgoire.
