= Signe Asmussen =

Danish mezzosoprano singer

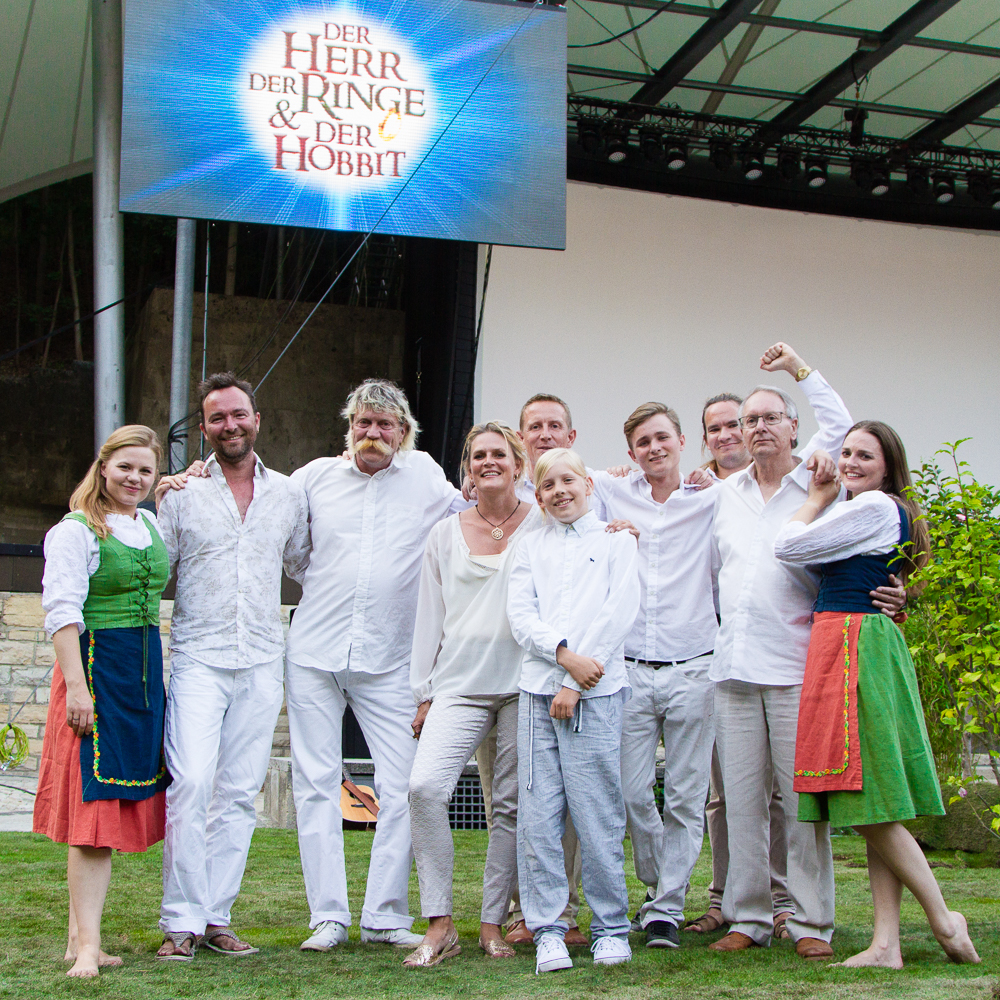
Signe Asmussen (centre) with The Tolkien Ensemble in 2015

Signe Asmussen Manuitt (born 1970) is a Danish mezzosoprano singer who has performed widely, not only in classical concerts, chamber music and opera but also in Latin jazz and as a member of The Tolkien Ensemble. Since 2001, she has made a mark as one of Denmark's most impressive female singers. In addition to appearances in Denmark, she has given recitals in London's Wigmore Hall and Amsterdam's Concertgebouw. Asmussen recently starred as Hanna Glawari in Operette Kompagniet's production of The Merry Widow. She is married to the Cuban Salsa singer Ernesto Manuitt.

== Biography ==
Born in 1970 in Copenhagen, Signe Asmussen was brought up in a musical family, learning to sing and play the violin from an early age. She studied at the Royal Danish Academy of Music under Bodil Øland and Keld Thaarup, graduating as a soloist in 2001. From the start, she received encouraging support from the critics as she branched out into virtually all genres. She became particularly fond of singing lieder, developing an extensive repertoire as a member of Liedkompagniet founded by Christian Westergaard. She has been accompanied by prominent pianists from Denmark and abroad, including Howard Shelley and Peter Hill, and has sung with orchestras conducted by Thomas Dausgaard, Lan Shui, Michel Tabachnik, Michael Seal and Howard Shelley.

Asmussen has participated in several ensembles, including Theatre of Voices, the Copenhagen Saxophone Quartet, Athelas Sinfonietta, Figura Ensemble. and the Esbjerg Ensemble. As an opera singer, she has appeared at the Royal Danish Opera and at Den Jyske Opera in a variety of roles, including Cherubino in The Marriage of Figaro, Bertha in The Barber of Seville and Musette in La Bohème. In 2013, she sang and played the violin in Sangbogen fra Eldorado, a lively baroque concert inspired by 17th and 18th century Latin-American songs. As a member of Grupo Cubita, she has also sung modern Cuban numbers.

== Awards ==
Signe Asmussen has received a number of grants and scholarships. In 2009, she was awarded the Aksel Schiøtz prize for excellence as a lieder singer.
