= Decimal =

Number in base-10 numeral system

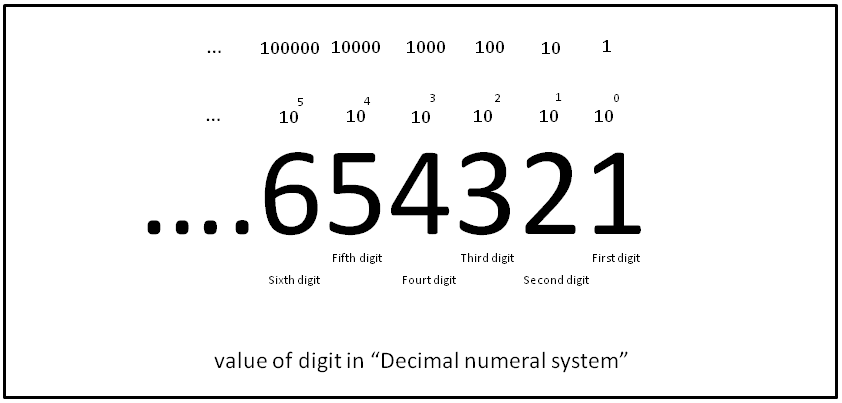
Place value of number in decimal system

A decimal system (also called base-ten, denary or decenary) is a numeral system that uses ten as its radix (base). Decimal systems are the global standard for denoting integer and non-integer numbers. The way of denoting numbers in a decimal system is often referred to as decimal notation. Presently, the most common decimal system is the Hindu–Arabic numeral system, which is a positional numeral system. However, there are also non-positional base-ten systems, such as Roman or Chinese numerals.

A decimal numeral (also often just decimal or, less correctly, decimal number), generally refers to the notation of a number in a decimal numeral system. Non-integral decimals may be identified by a decimal separator (usually "." or "," as in 25.9703 or 3.1415). In English, the word decimal often refers to the digits after the decimal separator, for example, that "3.14 is the approximation of π to two decimals" or "two decimal places."

The numbers that may be represented exactly by a decimal of finite length are the decimal fractions. That is, fractions of the form a/10^{n}, where a is an integer, and n is a non-negative integer. Decimal fractions also result from the addition of an integer and a fractional part; the resulting sum sometimes is called a fractional number.

Decimals are commonly used to approximate real numbers. By increasing the number of digits after the decimal separator, one can make the approximation errors as small as one wants, when one has a method for computing the new digits. In the sciences, the number of decimal places given generally gives an indication of the precision to which a quantity is known; for example, if a mass is given as 1.32 milligrams, it usually means there is reasonable confidence that the true mass is somewhere between 1.315 milligrams and 1.325 milligrams, whereas if it is given as 1.320 milligrams, then it is likely between 1.3195 and 1.3205 milligrams. The same holds in pure mathematics; for example, if one computes the square root of 22 to two digits past the decimal point, the answer is 4.69, whereas computing it to three digits, the answer is 4.690. The extra 0 at the end is meaningful, in spite of the fact that 4.69 and 4.690 are the same real number.

In principle, the decimal expansion of any real number can be carried out as far as desired past the decimal point. If the expansion reaches a point where all remaining digits are zero, then the remainder can be omitted, and such an expansion is called a terminating decimal. A repeating decimal is an infinite decimal that, after some place, repeats indefinitely the same sequence of digits (e.g., 5.123144144144144... = 5.1231̅4̅4̅). An infinite decimal represents a rational number, the quotient of two integers, if and only if it is a repeating decimal or has a finite number of non-zero digits.

== Origin ==
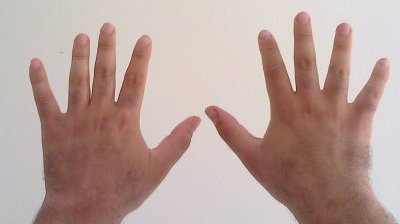
Ten digits on two hands, the possible origin of decimal counting

Many numeral systems of ancient civilizations use ten and its powers for representing numbers, possibly because there are ten fingers on two hands and people started counting by using their fingers. Examples are firstly the Egyptian numerals, then the Brahmi numerals, Greek numerals, Hebrew numerals, Roman numerals, and Chinese numerals. Very large numbers were difficult to represent in these old numeral systems, and only the best mathematicians were able to multiply or divide large numbers. These difficulties were completely solved with the introduction of the Hindu–Arabic numeral system for representing integers. This system has been extended to represent some non-integer numbers, called decimal fractions or decimal numbers, for forming the decimal numeral system.

== Decimal notation ==
For writing numbers, a decimal system typically uses ten decimal digits, a decimal mark, and, for negative numbers, a minus sign "−". The decimal digits in Arabic numerals are 0, 1, 2, 3, 4, 5, 6, 7, 8, 9; the decimal separator is the dot "." in many countries (mostly English-speaking), and a comma "," in other countries.

For representing a non-negative number, a decimal numeral consists of

- either a (finite) sequence of digits (such as "2017"), where the entire sequence represents an integer:
  $$a_ma_{m-1}\ldots a_0$$
- or a decimal mark separating two sequences of digits (such as "20.70828")
  $$a_ma_{m-1}\ldots a_0.b_1b_2\ldots b_n.$$

If m > 0, that is, if the first sequence contains at least two digits, it is generally assumed that the first digit a_{m} is not zero. In some circumstances it may be useful to have one or more 0's on the left; this does not change the value represented by the decimal: for example, 3.14 = 03.14 = 003.14. Similarly, if the final digit on the right of the decimal mark is zero—that is, if b_{n} = 0—it may be removed; conversely, trailing zeros may be added after the decimal mark without changing the represented number; (Note: Sometimes, the extra zeros are used for indicating the accuracy of a measurement. For example, "15.00 m" may indicate that the measurement error is less than one centimetre (0.01 m), while "15 m" may mean that the length is roughly fifteen metres and that the error may exceed 10 centimetres.) for example, 15 = 15.0 = 15.00 and 5.2 = 5.20 = 5.200.

For representing a negative number, a minus sign is placed before a_{m}.

The numeral $a_ma_{m-1}\ldots a_0.b_1b_2\ldots b_n$ represents the number
$$a_m10^m+a_{m-1}10^{m-1}+\cdots+a_{0}10^0+\frac{b_1}{10^1}+\frac{b_2}{10^2}+\cdots+\frac{b_n}{10^n}.$$

The integer part or integral part of a decimal numeral is the integer written to the left of the decimal separator (see also truncation). For a non-negative decimal numeral, it is the largest integer that is not greater than the decimal. The part from the decimal separator to the right is the fractional part, which equals the difference between the numeral and its integer part.

When the integral part of a numeral is zero, it may occur, typically in computing, that the integer part is not written (for example, .1234, instead of 0.1234). In normal writing, this is generally avoided, because of the risk of confusion between the decimal mark and other punctuation.

In brief, the contribution of each digit to the value of a number depends on its position in the numeral.

== Decimal fractions ==
Decimal fractions (sometimes called decimal numbers, especially in contexts involving explicit fractions) are the rational numbers that may be expressed as a fraction whose denominator is a power of ten. For example, the decimal expressions $0.8, 14.89, 0.00079, 1.618, 3.14159$ represent the fractions 8/10, 1489/100, 79/100000, 1618/1000 and 314159/100000, and therefore denote decimal fractions. An example of a fraction that cannot be represented by a decimal expression (with a finite number of digits) is 1/3, 3 not being a power of 10.

More generally, a decimal with n digits after the separator (a point or comma) represents the fraction with denominator 10^{n}, whose numerator is the integer obtained by removing the separator.

It follows that a number is a decimal fraction if and only if it has a finite decimal representation.

Expressed as fully reduced fractions, the decimal numbers are those whose denominator is a product of a power of 2 and a power of 5. Thus the smallest denominators of decimal numbers are

$$1=2^0\cdot 5^0, 2=2^1\cdot 5^0, 4=2^2\cdot 5^0, 5=2^0\cdot 5^1, 8=2^3\cdot 5^0, 10=2^1\cdot 5^1, 16=2^4\cdot 5^0, 20=2^2\cdot5^1, 25=2^0\cdot 5^2, \ldots$$

=== Approximation using decimal numbers ===
Decimal numerals do not allow an exact representation for all real numbers. Nevertheless, they allow approximating every real number with any desired accuracy, e.g., the decimal 3.14159 approximates π, being less than 10^{−5} off; so decimals are widely used in science, engineering and everyday life.

More precisely, for every real number x and every positive integer n, there are two decimals L and u with at most n digits after the decimal mark such that L ≤ x ≤ u and (u − L) = 10^{−n}.

Numbers are very often obtained as the result of measurement. As measurements are subject to measurement uncertainty with a known upper bound, the result of a measurement is well-represented by a decimal with n digits after the decimal mark, as soon as the absolute measurement error is bounded from above by 10^{−n}. In practice, measurement results are often given with a certain number of digits after the decimal point, which indicate the error bounds. For example, although 0.080 and 0.08 denote the same number, the decimal numeral 0.080 suggests a measurement with an error less than 0.001, while the numeral 0.08 indicates an absolute error bounded by 0.01. In both cases, the true value of the measured quantity could be, for example, 0.0803 or 0.0796 (see also significant figures).

== Infinite decimal expansion ==
For a real number x and an integer n ≥ 0, let [x]_{n} denote the (finite) decimal expansion of the greatest number that is not greater than x that has exactly n digits after the decimal mark. Let d_{i} denote the last digit of [x]_{i}. It is straightforward to see that [x]_{n} may be obtained by appending d_{n} to the right of [x]_{n−1}. This way one has

[x]_{n} = [x]_{0}.d_{1}d_{2}...d_{n−1}d_{n},

and the difference of [x]_{n−1} and [x]_{n} amounts to

$$\left\vert \left [ x \right ]_n-\left [ x \right ]_{n-1} \right\vert=d_n\cdot10^{-n}<10^{-n+1}$$,

which is either 0, if d_{n} = 0, or gets arbitrarily small as n tends to infinity. According to the definition of a limit, x is the limit of [x]_{n} when n tends to infinity. This is written as$\; x = \lim_{n\rightarrow\infty} [x]_n \;$or

x = [x]_{0}.d_{1}d_{2}...d_{n}...,

which is called an infinite decimal expansion of x.

Conversely, for any integer [x]_{0} and any sequence of digits$\;(d_n)_{n=1}^{\infty}$ the (infinite) expression [x]_{0}.d_{1}d_{2}...d_{n}... is an infinite decimal expansion of a real number x. This expansion is unique if neither all d_{n} are equal to 9 nor all d_{n} are equal to 0 for n large enough (for all n greater than some natural number N).

If all d_{n} for n > N equal to 9 and [x]_{n} = [x]_{0}.d_{1}d_{2}...d_{n}, the limit of the sequence$\;([x]_n)_{n=1}^{\infty}$ is the decimal fraction obtained by replacing the last digit that is not a 9, i.e.: d_{N}, by d_{N} + 1, and replacing all subsequent 9s by 0s (see 0.999...).

Any such decimal fraction, i.e.: d_{n} = 0 for n > N, may be converted to its equivalent infinite decimal expansion by replacing d_{N} by d_{N} − 1 and replacing all subsequent 0s by 9s (see 0.999...).

In summary, every real number that is not a decimal fraction has a unique infinite decimal expansion. Each decimal fraction has exactly two infinite decimal expansions, one containing only 0s after some place, which is obtained by the above definition of [x]_{n}, and the other containing only 9s after some place, which is obtained by defining [x]_{n} as the greatest number that is less than x, having exactly n digits after the decimal mark.

=== Rational numbers ===
Long division allows computing the infinite decimal expansion of a rational number. If the rational number is a decimal fraction, the division stops eventually, producing a decimal numeral, which may be prolongated into an infinite expansion by adding infinitely many zeros. If the rational number is not a decimal fraction, the division may continue indefinitely. However, as all successive remainders are less than the divisor, there are only a finite number of possible remainders, and after some place, the same sequence of digits must be repeated indefinitely in the quotient. That is, one has a repeating decimal. For example,

1/81 = 0. 012345679 012... (with the group 012345679 indefinitely repeating).

The converse is also true: if, at some point in the decimal representation of a number, the same string of digits starts repeating indefinitely, the number is rational.

| For example, if x is | 0.4156156156... |
| then 10,000x is | 4156.156156156... |
| and 10x is | 4.156156156... |
| so 10,000x − 10x, i.e. 9,990x, is | 4152.000000000... |
| and x is | 4152/9990 |

or, dividing both numerator and denominator by 6, 692/1665.

== Decimal computation ==
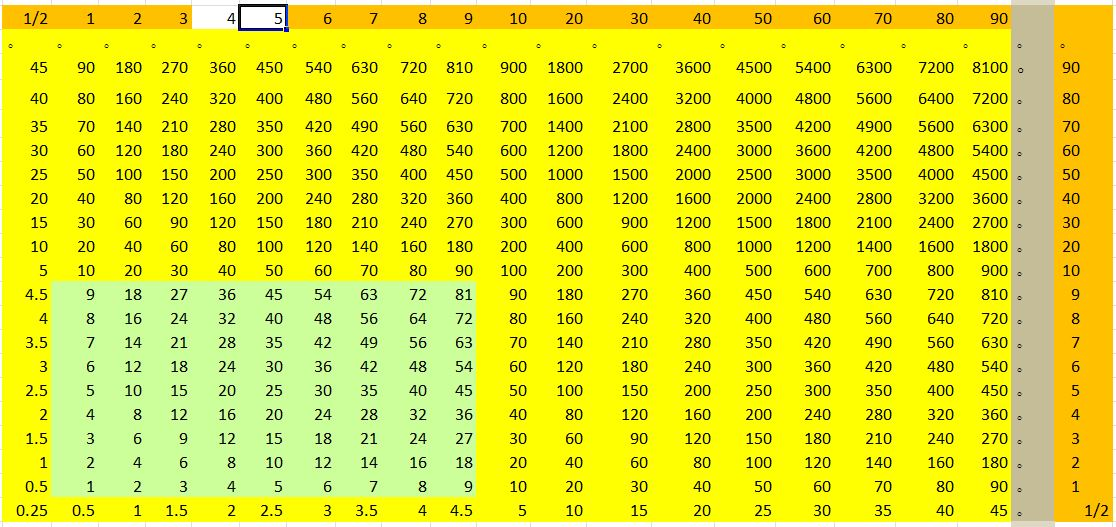
Diagram of the world's earliest known multiplication table (c. 305 BCE) from the Warring States period

Most modern computer hardware and software systems commonly use a binary representation internally (although many early computers, such as the ENIAC or the IBM 650, used decimal representation internally). For external use by computer specialists, this binary representation is sometimes presented in the related octal or hexadecimal systems.

For most purposes, however, binary values are converted to or from the equivalent decimal values for presentation to or input from humans; computer programs express literals in decimal by default. (123.1, for example, is written as such in a computer program, even though many computer languages are unable to encode that number precisely.)

Both computer hardware and software also use internal representations which are effectively decimal for storing decimal values and doing arithmetic. Often this arithmetic is done on data which are encoded using some variant of binary-coded decimal, especially in database implementations, but there are other decimal representations in use (including decimal floating point such as in newer revisions of the IEEE 754 Standard for Floating-Point Arithmetic).

Decimal arithmetic is used in computers so that decimal fractional results of adding (or subtracting) values with a fixed length of their fractional part always are computed to this same length of precision. This is especially important for financial calculations, e.g., requiring in their results integer multiples of the smallest currency unit for book keeping purposes. This is not possible in binary, because the negative powers of $10$ have no finite binary fractional representation; and is generally impossible for multiplication (or division). See Arbitrary-precision arithmetic for exact calculations.

== History ==
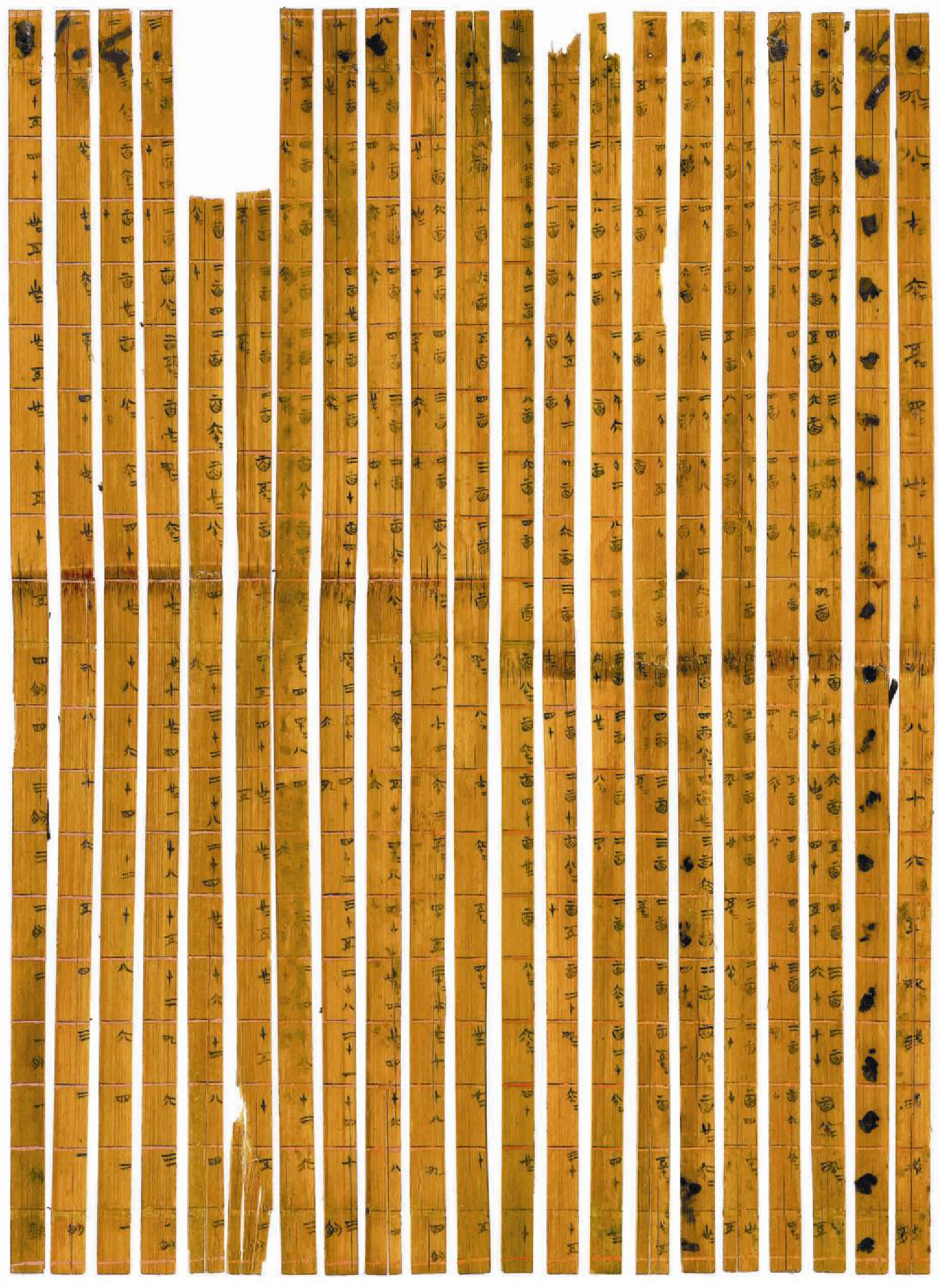
The world's earliest decimal multiplication table was made from bamboo slips, dating from 305 BCE, during the Warring States period in China.

Many ancient cultures calculated with numerals based on ten, perhaps because two human hands have ten fingers. Standardized weights used in the Indus Valley Civilisation (c. 3300–1300 BCE) were based on the ratios: 1/20, 1/10, 1/5, 1/2, 1, 2, 5, 10, 20, 50, 100, 200, and 500, while their standardized ruler – the Mohenjo-daro ruler – was divided into ten equal parts. Egyptian hieroglyphs, in evidence since around 3000 BCE, used a purely decimal system, as did the Linear A script (c. 1800–1450 BCE) of the Minoans and the Linear B script (c. 1400–1200 BCE) of the Mycenaeans. The Únětice culture in central Europe (2300-1600 BC) used standardised weights and a decimal system in trade. The number system of classical Greece also used powers of ten, including an intermediate base of 5, as did Roman numerals. Notably, the polymath Archimedes (c. 287–212 BCE) invented a decimal positional system in his Sand Reckoner which was based on 10^{8}. Hittite hieroglyphs (since 15th century BCE) were also strictly decimal.

The Egyptian hieratic numerals, the Greek alphabet numerals, the Hebrew alphabet numerals, the Roman numerals, the Chinese numerals and early Indian Brahmi numerals are all non-positional decimal systems, and required large numbers of symbols. For instance, Egyptian numerals used different symbols for 10, 20 to 90, 100, 200 to 900, 1,000, 2,000, 3,000, 4,000, to 10,000. The world's earliest positional decimal system was the Chinese rod calculus.

The world's earliest positional decimal system Upper row vertical form Lower row horizontal form

=== History of decimal fractions ===
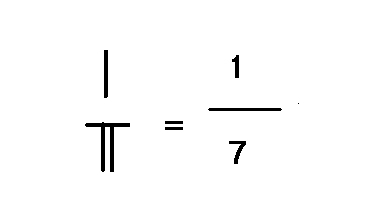
counting rod decimal fraction 1/7

Starting from the 2nd century BCE, some Chinese units for length were based on divisions into ten; by the 3rd century CE these metrological units were used to express decimal fractions of lengths, non-positionally. Calculations with decimal fractions of lengths were performed using positional counting rods, as described in the 3rd–5th century CE Sunzi Suanjing. The 5th century CE mathematician Zu Chongzhi calculated a 7-digit approximation of π. Qin Jiushao's book Mathematical Treatise in Nine Sections (1247) explicitly writes a decimal fraction representing a number rather than a measurement, using counting rods. The number 0.96644 is denoted

寸
.

Historians of Chinese science have speculated that the idea of decimal fractions may have been transmitted from China to the Middle East.

The 5th century Jain manuscript Lokavibhaga is notable as the oldest known text in the world that clearly uses three principles of positional decimal arithmetic system together – graphical signs and terms as numerals, assigning a value to the same numeral depending on the position it occupies in a number, and the use of fully operational zero. This Indian system contrasted with competing ancient arithmetic systems developed independently in Babylon, ancient Rome and China.

Al-Khwarizmi introduced fractions to Islamic countries in the early 9th century CE, written with a numerator above and denominator below, without a horizontal bar. This form of fraction remained in use for centuries.

Positional decimal fractions appear for the first time in a book by the Arab mathematician Abu'l-Hasan al-Uqlidisi written in the 10th century. The Jewish mathematician Immanuel Bonfils used decimal fractions around 1350 but did not develop any notation to represent them. The Persian mathematician Jamshid al-Kashi significantly advanced the theory in the 15th century. In his work, The Key to Arithmetic (Miftah al-Hisab), al-Kashi provided the first systematic and comprehensive treatment of decimal fractions as a complete system, predating similar European developments by nearly 175 years.

A forerunner of modern European decimal notation was introduced by Simon Stevin in the 16th century. Stevin's influential booklet De Thiende ("the art of tenths") was first published in Dutch in 1585 and translated into French as La Disme.

John Napier introduced using the period (.) to separate the integer part of a decimal number from the fractional part in his book on constructing tables of logarithms, published posthumously in 1620.

=== Natural languages ===
A method of expressing every possible natural number using a set of ten symbols emerged in India. Several Indian languages show a straightforward decimal system. Dravidian languages have numbers between 10 and 20 expressed in a regular pattern of addition to 10.

The Hungarian language also uses a straightforward decimal system. All numbers between 10 and 20 are formed regularly (e.g. 11 is expressed as "tizenegy" literally "one on ten"), as with those between 20 and 100 (23 as "huszonhárom" = "three on twenty").

A straightforward decimal rank system with a word for each order (10 十, 100 百, 1000 千, 10,000 万), and in which 11 is expressed as ten-one and 23 as two-ten-three, and 89,345 is expressed as 8 (ten thousands) 万 9 (thousand) 千 3 (hundred) 百 4 (tens) 十 5 is found in Chinese, and in Vietnamese with a few irregularities. Japanese, Korean, and Thai have imported the Chinese decimal system. Many other languages with a decimal system have special words for the numbers between 10 and 20, and decades. For example, in English 11 is "eleven" not "ten-one" or "one-teen".

Incan languages such as Quechua and Aymara have an almost straightforward decimal system, in which 11 is expressed as ten with one and 23 as two-ten with three.

Some psychologists suggest irregularities of the English names of numerals may hinder children's counting ability.

=== Other bases ===
Some cultures do, or did, use other bases of numbers.

- Babylonian cuneiform numerals, the oldest known positional number system, used base 60.
- Pre-Columbian Mesoamerican cultures such as the Maya used a base-20 system (perhaps based on using all twenty fingers and toes).
- The Yuki language in California and the Oto-Pamean languages in Mexico have octal (base-8) systems because the speakers count using the spaces between their fingers rather than the fingers themselves.
- The existence of a non-decimal base in the earliest traces of the Germanic languages is attested by the presence of words and glosses meaning that the count is in decimal (cognates to "ten-count" or "tenty-wise"); such would be expected if normal counting is not decimal, and unusual if it were. Where this counting system is known, it is based on the "long hundred" = 120, and a "long thousand" of 1200. The descriptions like "long" only appear after the "small hundred" of 100 appeared with the Christians. E. V. Gordon's Introduction to Old Norse gives number names that belong to this system. An expression cognate to 'one hundred and eighty' translates to 200, and the cognate to 'two hundred' translates to 240. Goodare details the use of the long hundred in Scotland in the Middle Ages, giving examples such as calculations where the carry implies i C (i.e. one hundred) as 120, etc. That the general population were not alarmed to encounter such numbers suggests common enough use. It is also possible to avoid hundred-like numbers by using intermediate units, such as stones and pounds, rather than a long count of pounds. Goodare gives examples of numbers like vii score, where one avoids the hundred by using extended scores. There is also a paper by W.H. Stevenson, on 'Long Hundred and its uses in England'.
- Many or all of the Chumashan languages originally used a base-4 counting system, in which the names for numbers were structured according to multiples of 4 and 16.
- Many languages use quinary (base-5) number systems, including Gumatj, Nunggubuyu, Kuurn Kopan Noot and Saraveca. Of these, Gumatj is the only true 5–25 language known, in which 25 is the higher group of 5.
- Some Nigerians use duodecimal systems. So did some small communities in India and Nepal, as indicated by their languages.
- The Huli language of Papua New Guinea is reported to have base-15 numbers. Ngui means 15, ngui ki means 15 × 2 = 30, and ngui ngui means 15 × 15 = 225.
- Umbu-Ungu, also known as Kakoli, is reported to have base-24 numbers. Tokapu means 24, tokapu talu means 24 × 2 = 48, and tokapu tokapu means 24 × 24 = 576.
- Ngiti is reported to have a base-32 number system with base-4 cycles.
- The Ndom language of Papua New Guinea is reported to have base-6 numerals. Mer means 6, mer an thef means 6 × 2 = 12, nif means 36, and nif thef means 36×2 = 72.

== See also ==
- Algorism
- Binary-coded decimal (BCD)
- Decimal classification
- Decimal computer
- Decimal time
- Decimal representation
- Decimal section numbering
- Decimal separator
- Decimalisation
- Densely packed decimal (DPD)
- Duodecimal
- Metric prefix
- Octal
- Scientific notation
- Serial decimal
