= Gubben Noak =

Traditional Swedish song

- Drinking song
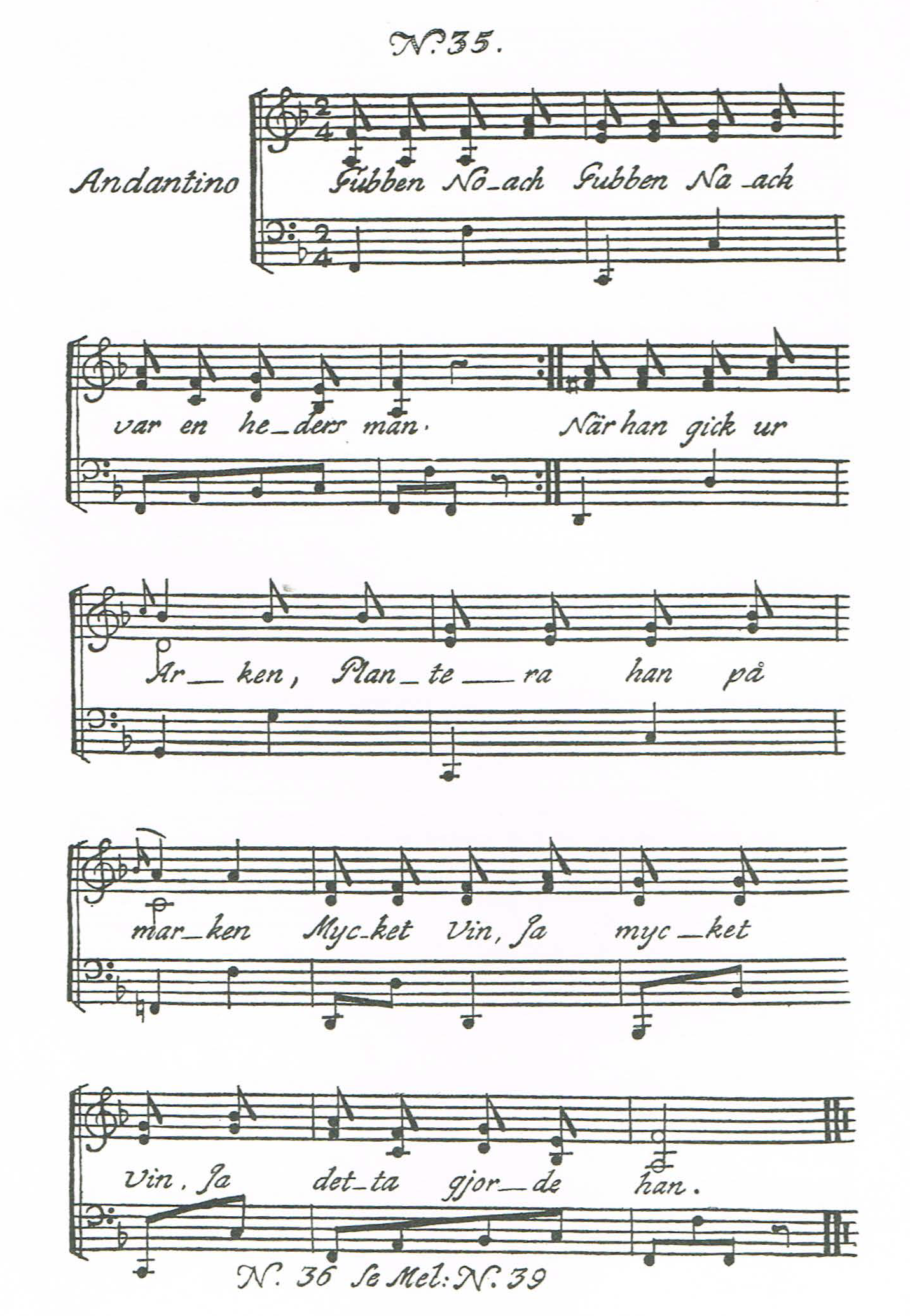
- First page of sheet music for 1791 edition
- English: Old Man Noah
- Written: 1766, probably earlier
- Text: poem by Carl Michael Bellman
- Language: Swedish
- Melody: Bellman
- Composed: 1766
- Published: 1791 in Fredman's Songs
- Scoring: voice and cittern

"Gubben Noak" ("Old Man Noah", originally "Om gubben Noach och hans fru" or just "Gubben Noach", and since 1791 also "Fredmans sång n:o 35") is a traditional Swedish song, a drinking song and bible travesty written in 1766 or earlier by Carl Michael Bellman. The song is possibly the best known of all Bellman's works. The song was initially published anonymously for fear of the church. In 1768 the Lund chapter attempted to have all copies of the song and other biblical travesties destroyed. It was included in the 1936 Songs for the Philologists by J. R. R. Tolkien and E. V. Gordon. Simplified and more innocent versions of the song are widely sung by children around the world. English versions have been recorded by Adam McNaughtan and the Linköping University Male Voice Choir.

== Context ==
Carl Michael Bellman is a central figure in the Swedish ballad tradition and a powerful influence in Swedish music, known for his 1790 Fredman's Epistles and his 1791 Fredman's Songs. A solo entertainer, he played the cittern, accompanying himself as he performed his songs at the royal court.

Jean Fredman (1712 or 1713–1767) was a real watchmaker of Bellman's Stockholm. The fictional Fredman, alive after 1767, but without employment, is the supposed narrator in Bellman's epistles and songs. The epistles, written and performed in different styles, from drinking songs and laments to pastorales, paint a complex picture of the life of the city during the 18th century. A frequent theme is the demimonde, with Fredman's cheerfully drunk Order of Bacchus, a loose company of ragged men who favour strong drink and prostitutes. At the same time as depicting this reality, Bellman creates a Rococo picture of life, full of classical allusion, following the French post-Baroque poets. The women, including the beautiful Ulla Winblad, are "nymphs", while Neptune's festive troop of followers and sea-creatures sport in Stockholm's waters. The juxtaposition of elegant and low life is humorous, sometimes burlesque, but always graceful and sympathetic. The songs are "most ingeniously" set to their music, which is nearly always borrowed and skilfully adapted.

== Song ==
=== Music and verse form ===
Melody of Fredman's Song 35
Andantino melody in 2/4 time, composed by Bellman himself

The song is in 2/4 time and is marked Andantino; the rhyming scheme is ABCCDB. The melody appears to have been written by Bellman; no earlier sources have been found.

=== Lyrics ===
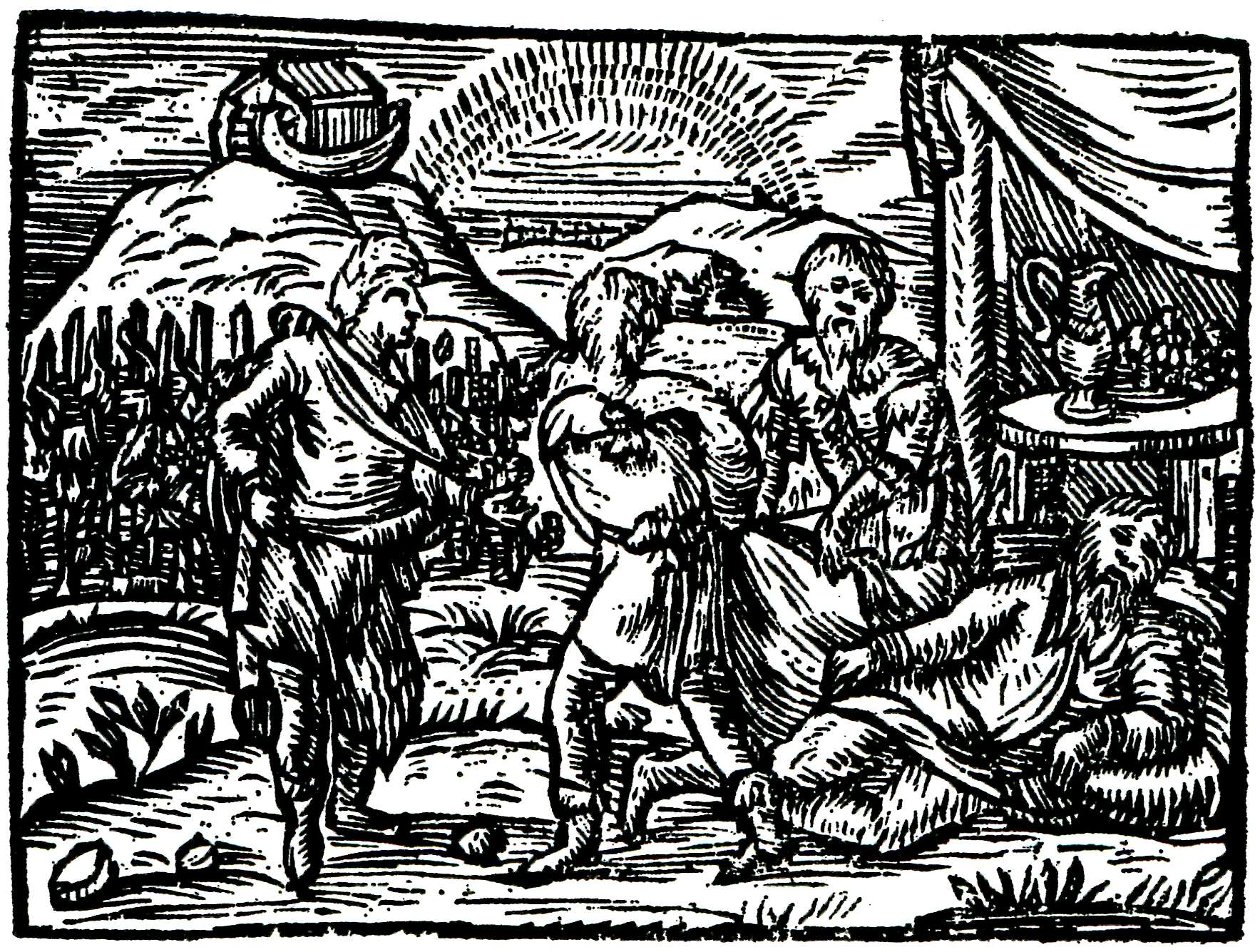
The song is based on the biblical mention of Noah's becoming drunk, as shown in this 1747 woodcut showing him lying drunk, with a vineyard and his ark resting on Mount Ararat in the background, in a contemporary Swedish edition of Johann Hübner's bible stories.

"Gubben Noak" ("Old Man Noah", originally "Om gubben Noach och hans fru" or just "Gubben Noach", and since 1791 also "Fredmans sång n:o 35") is a traditional Swedish song. It is both a drinking song and a bible travesty by Carl Michael Bellman. Bellman had completed the song by 1766, but it was probably written earlier. The setting for the song is the time when Noah from the Old Testament had come to rest on the mountains of Ararat. As mentioned in the Book of Genesis 9:20–21, Noah established a vineyard and got drunk from drinking the wine. The rest of the story departs from the biblical account. Along with Fredman's Songs 36–43, such as "Joakim uti Babylon" and "Ahasverus var så mäktig", Gubben Noak is one of the biblical travesties that made Bellman popular during the 1760s.

First stanza of song 35
Carl Michael Bellman, 1791

Gubben Noach, Gubben Noach
Var en hedersman, :||:
När han gick ur arken
Plantera han på marken
Mycket vin, ja mycket vin, ja
Detta gjorde han.

Paul Britten Austin, 1977

Old man Noah, old man Noah,
was the man for me.
When the Flood abated
Noah cultivated
Many a vineyard. Many a vineyard.
Planted 'em did he!

== Reception and legacy ==
Bellman chose to first publish the song anonymously on broadsheets throughout Sweden. In 1768 the Lund chapter reacted by sending a letter to the priests of the diocese, attempting to collect all prints and transcripts of "Gubben Noach" and other biblical travesties, in order to have them destroyed. Bellman's biographer Lars Lönnroth comments that this showed that the church had failed to understand that ordinary people saw the song as innocent fun. Far from suppressing the song, the church's attention increased its fame, and it quickly became Bellman's most popular work to date. Lönnroth notes that songs praising Noah had been current among the bacchanalian poets of Germany and France from Renaissance times, and that Jean Le Houx's sixteenth century French poem contained phrases much like Bellman's:

A sixteenth century French precursor of "Gubben Noak"
Jean Le Houx

Que Noé fut un patriarche digne!
Car ce fut luy qui nous planta la vigne
Et beut premier le ius de son raisin.
O le bon vin!

Prose translation

What a noble patriarch Noah was!
As it was he who planted our vines
And was the first to drink the juice of his grapes.
O the good wine!

In 1791 "Gubben Noak" was included in the song book Fredmans sånger, along with eight other biblical travesties, such as "Gubben Loth och hans gamla Fru" (Songs of Fredman no 35–43). Simplified and more innocent versions, such as Björnen sover ("The bear's asleep"), and Atte Katte Nuwa ("To catch a whale"), have become popular as children's songs. The song was included in the 1936 compilation of poems by J. R. R. Tolkien and E. V. Gordon, Songs for the Philologists. It has spread around the world to become not just one of Bellman's best-known works, but one of the most popular songs ever written. The Finnish composer Oskar Merikanto wrote his Old Man Noah Variations in 1907, based on Bellman's song. English versions of "Gubben Noak" have been recorded by Adam McNaughtan and the Linköping University Male Voice Choir.

== Sources ==
- Britten Austin, Paul (1967). The Life and Songs of Carl Michael Bellman: Genius of the Swedish Rococo. New York: Allhem, Malmö American-Scandinavian Foundation. ISBN 978-3-932759-00-0.
- Britten Austin, Paul (1977). Fredman's Epistles and Songs. Stockholm: Reuter and Reuter. pp. 127–129. OCLC 5059758.
- Hassler, Göran (1989). Bellman – en antologi [Bellman – an anthology]. Illustrated by Peter Dahl. Stockholm: En bok för alla. ISBN 91-7448-742-6.
- Kleveland, Åse (1984). Fredmans epistlar & sånger [The songs and epistles of Fredman]. Illustrated by Svenolov Ehrén. Stockholm: Informationsförlaget. ISBN 91-7736-059-1. (with facsimiles of sheet music from first editions in 1790, 1791)
- Lönnroth, Lars (2005). Ljuva karneval! : om Carl Michael Bellmans diktning [Lovely Carnival! : about Carl Michael Bellman's Verse]. Stockholm: Bonniers. ISBN 978-91-0-057245-7. OCLC 61881374.
