= Cyril Jackson (broadcaster) =

British scholar and broadcaster (1908–1982)

- Cyril Jackson with his wife Ester in 1966
- Born: 1908; England
- Died: 31 December 1982 (aged 74); Eastbourne, England
- Education: University of Leeds; University of Manchester
- Alma mater: University of Leeds
- Known for: research on the poetry of Matthias Jochumsson
- Spouse: Ester Friðriksdóttir Hallgrímsson (after 1942)
- Children: 2
- Scientific career
- Fields: Icelandic literature
- Institutions: Menntaskólinn á Akureyri; Háskóli Íslands
- Doctoral advisor: E. V. Gordon

Cyril Jackson (born 1908 in northern England, died 1982 in Eastbourne) was an expert in the poetry of Matthías Jochumsson and a BBC broadcaster.

== Education ==
Jackson took a bachelor's degree in English at the University of Leeds from 1926-29, where his studies included Old Norse, in a class of five or six, under E. V. Gordon. He was a member of the University's Viking Club, and a letter by Jackson, auctioned in 2003 into private ownership along with Jackon's copy of the rare volume Songs for the Philologists, recalls "boozy evenings in the Senior Staff Common Room, where [...] we sang those songs to nursery rhyme tunes". J. R. R. Tolkien, who at that time had recently left Leeds for Oxford, would sometimes return, "when we naturally had a 'party'. After an unreasonable amount of ale [Tolkien's] declamation of bits of Beowulf and the Battle of Maldon was magnificent".

These studies inspired Jackson to visit Iceland following his degree. Through his friend Sigurður Nordal, Gordon learned that the head teacher of Menntaskólinn á Akureyri, Sigurður Guðmundsson, was in need of an Englishman to teach at the school, and accordingly dispatched Jackson. In July 1929, aged twenty-one, Jackson arrived in Iceland, staying first with the education minister Ásgeir Ásgeirsson. Jackson then proceeded to Munkaþverá í Eyjafirði to improve his Icelandic over the summer. Then, lodging in Akureyri with the geologist Steinþór Sigurðsson, he began teaching that October. Many of his students were older than he was.

In 1930 or 1931 Jackson returned to England. In 1931 he took a master's degree at Leeds; his two-volume thesis was "A Collected Edition of the Hitherto Uncollected and Unpublished Poems of Matthías Jochumsson". He proceeded to a doctoral degree at the University of Manchester, where Gordon then worked, on Matthías Jochumsson's poetry, a topic suggested by Sigurður Nordal. He completed his thesis in 1934. Jackson was noted for his own facility with Icelandic verse, both for the quantity he knew by heart, and for his ability to compose it.

== Career ==
By the completion of his doctoral thesis, Jackson was more interested in working with people than books and became an English teacher in a state-school. From 1936 to 1940 he was the Educational Officer for the BBC's educational radio broadcasting in north-west England.

In 1940, during the British occupation of Iceland in the Second World War, Jackson returned to Iceland as a British Council-funded lecturer at the University of Iceland, also working in radio broadcasting for British troops on the island, and arranging for Icelandic journalists to visit Britain. During that time he met Ester (or in some sources Esther) Hallgrímsson, youngest daughter of the priest Friðrik Hallgrímsson, then Dean of Reykjavík, and Bentína Björnsdóttir Hallgrímsson. The two married in June 1942 in Hallgrímskirkja, in a ceremony officiated by Friðrik.

In 1945 Jackson returned to Britain and resumed his work for the BBC, both in radio and television. From 1957 to 1958, as the BBC's School Broadcasting Organiser for Television, Jackson was involved in a scheme to increase and broaden the represention of people of colour in BBC programming, particularly through the series Living in the Commonwealth. He was made a Member of the Order of the British Empire for his service.

== Death and legacy ==
Jackson died 31 December 1982 in Eastbourne Hospital.

Jackson and Ester had a daughter, Anna, who also went on to work for the BBC, and a son, Richard.
