= Bagme Bloma =

Poem in Gothic by J. R. R. Tolkien

"Bagmē Blōma" (Gothic language: "Flower of the Trees") by J. R. R. Tolkien is a poem in the 1936 Songs for the Philologists, and the only one in that collection in the Gothic language. It was to be sung to the tune of "O Lazy Sheep!" by Mantle Childe. Scholars have found the poem beautiful, and have debated its interpretation. Tom Shippey proposed that the Birch tree, praised in the poem, symbolises the 'B' scheme of English teaching, namely Tolkien's own subject, philology. Verlyn Flieger doubted the connection, writing that the Birch played a significant emotional role in Smith of Wootton Major, as in the poem, and that this was only diminished by seeking a further interpretation.

== Publication history ==
The poem was published along with a collection of others in the rare privately-printed 1936 book Songs for the Philologists, unauthorised by either of the poems' authors, J. R. R. Tolkien and E. V. Gordon. It was reprinted, together with a Modern English translation by Rhona Beare, in Tom Shippey's The Road to Middle-earth.

== Poem ==
The poem has three verses, each of six lines. It was intended to be sung to the tune of "O Lazy Sheep!" by Mantle Childe, after an old French air.

First Verse
Tolkien's Gothic

Brunaim bairiþ Bairka bogum
laubans liubans liudandei,
gilwagroni, glitmunjandei,
bagme bloma, blauandei,
fagrafahsa, liþulinþi,
fraujinondei fairguni.

Rhona Beare's translation

The birch bears fine
leaves on shining boughs,
it grows pale green and glittering,
the flower of the trees in bloom,
fair-haired and supple-limbed,
the ruler of the mountain.

== Analysis ==
The poem was, like the others in the collection, written as a scholarly philological entertainment. Tolkien had to reconstruct some of the words he used from other Germanic languages, as little of the Gothic language survives. The scholar of historical linguistics Luzius Thöny has analysed the grammar and meaning of the words of the poem. He comments that Tolkien has to some extent relied on Old English rather than what is common to the Germanic languages, giving the example of bogum meaning "boughs", whereas in other Germanic languages "bog-" means "shoulder".

The Tolkien scholar Lucas Annear, in Tolkien Studies, writes that Tolkien "uses reconstruction liberally", which he finds understandable given the choice of Gothic and the private nature of the publication. He comments that the poem stands out from others in the collection: it is a serious poem with a lyrical tone, where many of the rest are written for comic effect. Verlyn Flieger describes the poem as "an unusually beautiful lyric, far lovelier in the Gothic than in English translation". She notes that another of Tolkien's poems in the collection, the Old English "Eadig Beo þu" ("Good Luck to You"), also concerns the Birch tree, and that both sing the tree's praises.

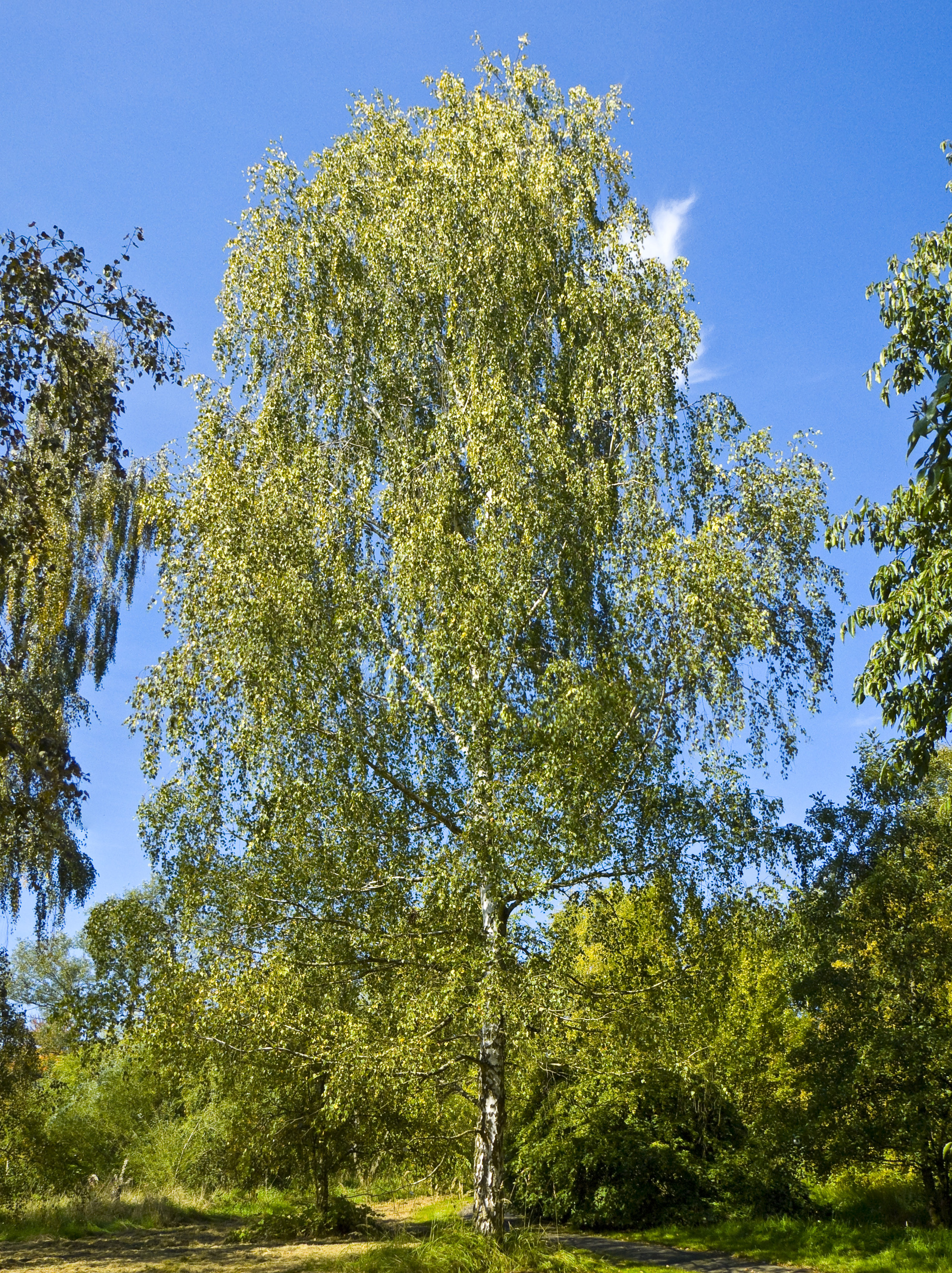
The poem sings the praises of the birch.

The leading Tolkien scholar Tom Shippey, in his book The Road to Middle-earth, connects the Birch (the "Beorc" rune-name in Old English) to the "B" scheme of English studies at the University of Leeds where Tolkien had taught, namely his subject, philology. This meant an interest in language and comparative linguistics, especially of the old Germanic languages like Old English and Old Norse. These things that Tolkien loved stood in sharp opposition to the "A" scheme, symbolised by the Oak tree (the "Ac" rune-name in Old English) for "literature and literary critics", meaning from the Early Modern period onwards. Shippey states that "oaks were furthermore the enemy: the enemy of philology, the enemy of imagination, the enemy of dragons". He links this meaning to Smith of Wootton Major, noting that the name of that story's Master Cook, Nokes, in Middle English "*atten okes" ("at the Oaks"), is connected to the Oak tree. He deduces that the Old Cook, Alf (Old English ælf, "Elf") "is a philologist-figure" while Nokes is "a critic-figure" and Smith himself must be "a Tolkien-figure". In Shippey's view, Bagme Bloma's praise of the Birch, with its defiance of wind and lightning, confirms the tree's symbolism of the "B" scheme of study.

Tom Shippey's interpretation of Tolkien's 'Birch'
Rune	Rune's name	English Studies	Tolkien's attitude
ᚪ	Ac (Oak tree)	'A' scheme, literature, literary criticism	The enemy of imagination
ᛒ	Beorc (Birch tree)	'B' scheme, language, comparative linguistics	His favourite subject, philology

The scholar of medieval literature Verlyn Flieger, while admiring the poem, and remarking that it is written in Gothic: "the only poem extant in that dead and buried language by any hand", is not convinced by Shippey's arguments, stating rather that Shippey's description of the Birch as a representation of "learning, severe learning, even discipline" and the world's "traditional opponent, scholarly study", "a kind of Golden Bough between Earth and Paradise" says little about the powerful emotional effect of the Birch episode in Smith. She connects that with the poem's "lightning flashes" (verse 3), saying there is no need to diminish that effect by looking for further symbolism.

== Sources ==
- Annear, Lucas (2011). "Language in Tolkien's "Bagme Bloma"". Tolkien Studies. 8 (1): 37–49. doi:10.1353/tks.2011.0005. ISSN 1547-3163. S2CID 170171873.
- Flieger, Verlyn (2001). A Question of Time: J.R.R. Tolkien's Road to Faërie. Kent State University Press. ISBN 978-0-87338-699-9.
- Shippey, Tom (2005) [1982]. "Appendix B "Four 'Asterisk' Poems"". The Road to Middle-Earth (Third ed.). HarperCollins. ISBN 978-0261102750.
- Thöny, Luzius (July 2005). "Bagme Bloma by J. R. R. Tolkien: Grammatische Analyse" [Bagme Bloma by J. R. R. Tolkien: Grammatical Analysis] (PDF) (in German). Swanrād.
