= Songs for the Philologists =

Poetry collection by J.R.R. Tolkien and E. V. Gordon

- Cover of the first (and only) edition
- Authors: J. R. R. Tolkien, E. V. Gordon, et al.
- Language: English
- Publisher: Privately printed in the Department of English, University College, London
- Publication date: 1936

Songs for the Philologists is a collection of poems by E. V. Gordon and J. R. R. Tolkien as well as traditional songs. It is the rarest Tolkien-related book.

== Context ==
The professors of language E.V. Gordon and J. R. R. Tolkien formed a Viking Club at Leeds University in the 1920s. It read and discussed Old Icelandic texts, and less seriously invented and sang songs on pub evenings. The Leeds philologist Alaric Hall stated in 2015 that the tradition still continued in the department.

== Publication ==
A collection of typescripts was compiled by Gordon in 1921–1926 for the students of the University of Leeds. In 1935 or 1936, this was given by A. H. Smith of University College London, a former student at Leeds, to a group of students to be printed privately. It was printed in 1936 with the impressum "Printed by G. Tillotson, A. H. Smith, B. Pattison and other members of the English Department, University College, London."

Since Smith had not asked permission of either Gordon or Tolkien, the printed booklets were not distributed. Most copies were destroyed in a fire started by a Second World War bomb, and only a few, perhaps around 14, survived. The book is accordingly "extremely rare", according to the University of Leeds, which has a copy.

In 2014, the estate of Gordon's eldest daughter Bridget Mackenzie sold a group of manuscripts written by Tolkien and owned by Gordon, some of which are manuscript version of texts printed in Songs for the Philologists.

== Tolkien's songs ==
Of the 30 songs in the collection, 13 were contributed by Tolkien:

1 "From One to Five", to the tune of "Three Wise Men of Gotham".

2 "Syx Mynet" (Old English: Six Pennies), to the tune of "I Love Sixpence".

3 "Ruddoc Hana" (Old English: Cock Robin), to the tune of "Who Killed Cock Robin".

4 "Ides Ælfscýne" (Old English: Elf-fair Lady), to the tune of "Daddy Neptune" by Thomas John Dibdin.

--- Reprinted, with a Modern English translation in The Road to Middle-earth

5 "Bagmē Blōma" (Gothic: Flower of the Trees), to the tune of "Lazy Sheep" (by Mantle Childe, after an old French air). The poem displays Tolkien's love of trees, and of language.

--- Reprinted, with a Modern English translation in The Road to Middle-Earth

6 "Éadig Béo þu!" (Old English: Good Luck to You), to the tune of "Twinkle, Twinkle, Little Star".

--- Reprinted, with a Modern English translation in The Road to Middle-earth

7 "Ofer Wídne Gársecg" (Old English: Across the Broad Ocean), to the tune of "The Mermaid".

--- Reprinted, with a Modern English translation in The Road to Middle-earth

First verse of one of Tolkien's Old English songs
Ofer wídne gársecg

Þa ofer wídne gársecg wéow unwidre ceald,
Sum hagusteald on lagu féoll on nicera geweald.
He legde lást swa fýres gnást, he snúde on sunde fléah,
Oþþæt he métte meremenn déopan grunde néah.

Across the broad ocean
(prose translation)

When the cold blast was blowing across the broad ocean,
a young man fell overboard, into the power of nixies.
As fast as fire he made his way, he swam along so quickly –
until he met the mermen near the deep sea-bottom.

"The Mermaid",
a traditional folksong

Oh 'twas in the broad Atlantic, mid the equinoctial gales
That a young fellow fell overboard among the sharks and whales
And down he went as a streak of light, so quickly down went he
Until he came to a mermaid at the bottom of the deep blue sea

8 "La Húru", to the tune of "O'Reilly".

9 "I Sat upon a Bench", to the tune of "The Carrion Crow".

10 "Natura Apis: Morali Ricardi Eremite", also to the tune of "O'Reilly".

11 "The Root of the Boot", to the tune of "The Fox Went Out".

--- Reprinted in Anderson's The Annotated Hobbit, and in revised form in The Return of the Shadow. Reprinted in The Tolkien Papers: Mankato Studies in English. Revised and printed in The Lord of the Rings and The Adventures of Tom Bombadil as 'The Stone Troll'. The manuscript is archived at the University of Leeds. The song's irregular strophic metre and rhyming scheme are those of the 15th century folk song "The fox went out on a winter's night"; Tolkien used the same scheme for the two "lays" (narrative poems) published in his Beowulf: A Translation and Commentary.

12 "Frenchmen Froth", to the tune of "The Vicar of Bray".

13 "Lit' and Lang'", to the tune of "Polly Put the Kettle On". In the Department of English at the University of Oxford where Tolkien worked, teaching was divided into two streams. "Lit'" meant "English Literature", i.e. the study of works from Shakespeare to modern times, whereas "Lang'" meant "English Language", meaning the philological study of Old English texts such as Beowulf, and Middle English, such as Sir Gawain and the Green Knight. Tolkien and Gordon were philologists and firmly in the "Lang'" camp, but they could see that it was dying out.

First verse of "Lit' and Lang'"

Once there were two little groups,
Called Lit' and Lang'.
Lit' was lazy till she died,
Of homophenes.
'I don't like philology',
Poor Lit' said.
Psychotherapeutics failed,
And now she's dead.

== The remaining songs ==
The remaining 17 songs were:

1 Grace. Part of a drinking song from Crotchet Castle by Thomas Love Peacock. To be sung to the tune of "The King of France".

2 Fara Með Víkingum. [Icelandic: To go with the Vikings]. This text is actually two unrelated stanzas of skaldic verse from Egils saga Skallagrímssonar, of which the first reads:

First verse of "Fara Með Víkingum"
Egill Skallagrímsson

Þat mælti mín móðir,
at mér skyldi kaupa
fley ok fagrar árar,
fara á brott með víkingum,
standa upp í stafni,
stýra dýrum knerri,
halda svá til hafnar
höggva mann ok annan.

1893 translation by W. C. Green

Thus counselled my mother,
For me should they purchase
A galley and good oars
To go forth a-roving [lit. would be "with Vikings"].
So may I high-standing,
A noble barque steering,
Hold course for the haven,
Hew down many foemen.

3 Já, láttu gamminn. [Icelandic] By Hannes Hafstein

4 Bring Us In Good Ale, 15th-century carol.

5 Björt Mey Og Hrein. [Icelandic] Translation of a Polish folk song by Stefán Ólafsson

6 Rokkvísa. [Icelandic: Song about rocks]. By Jón Thoroddsen elder.

7 Ólafur Liljurós. [Icelandic: Ólafur Lily-rose]. The folk song tells of a man who meets an Elvish maiden.

First verse of "Ólafur Liljurós"
Icelandic

Ólafur reið með björgum fram
Villir hann
Stillir hann
Hitti'hann fyrir sér álfarann
Þar rauður logi brann
Blíðan lagði byrinn undan björgunum.

Translation

Ólafur rode with hills ahead
He was lost
He was calm
He found before him an elf's abode
There a red flame burnt
Gentle blew the breeze from the hills ahead.

8 Gaudeamus [Latin: Let us rejoice]

9 Icelandic Song [Það liggur svo makalaust]. [Icelandic: It's so incomparable] To be sung to the tune of "O' Reilly". By Bjarni Thorsteinsson

10 Su Klukka Heljar. [Icelandic: That Bell of Hell] To be sung to the tune of "The Bells of Hell". By E. V. Gordon

11 Gubben Noach. [Swedish: Old Man Noah], one of Fredman's Songs by Carl Michael Bellman, accompanied by Icelandic translation by Eiríkur Björnsson

First verse of Gubben Noach
Carl Michael Bellman, 1791

Gubben Noach, Gubben Noach
Var en hedersman, :||:
När han gick ur arken
Plantera han på marken
Mycket vin, ja mycket vin, ja
Detta gjorde han.

Translation

Old man Noah, old man Noah
Was a man of honour
When he went out of the ark
He planted seeds in the ground
Much wine, yes much wine, yes
That's what he did.

12 Bí, bí Og Blaka. [Icelandic lullaby] By Sveinbjörn Egilsson

13 Guþ let vaxa. [Icelandic] By Hannes Hafstein. To be sung to the tune of "Laus Deo" by Josef Haydn.

14 Salve! [Latin: Greetings!]. By Benedikt Sveinbjarnarson Gröndal.

15 Hwan ic béo déad. [Old English, Scots, and Gothic: When I'm Dead]. By E. V. Gordon

16 Vísur Íslendinga. [Icelandic: Icelandic Song] By Jónas Hallgrímsson

17 Gömul Kynni. [Icelandic] By Árni Pálsson, imitating Robert Burns
