= Benedikt Gröndal =

Benedikt Gröndal is the name of:

- Benedikt Gröndal the elder (1762–1825), judge and poet
- Benedikt Sveinbjarnarson Gröndal (1826–1907), naturalist and poet
- Benedikt Sigurðsson Gröndal (1924–2010), Prime Minister of Iceland
