= Olvir the Child-Sparer =

Viking mentioned in several historical sources

- Old Norse: Ölvir barnakarl
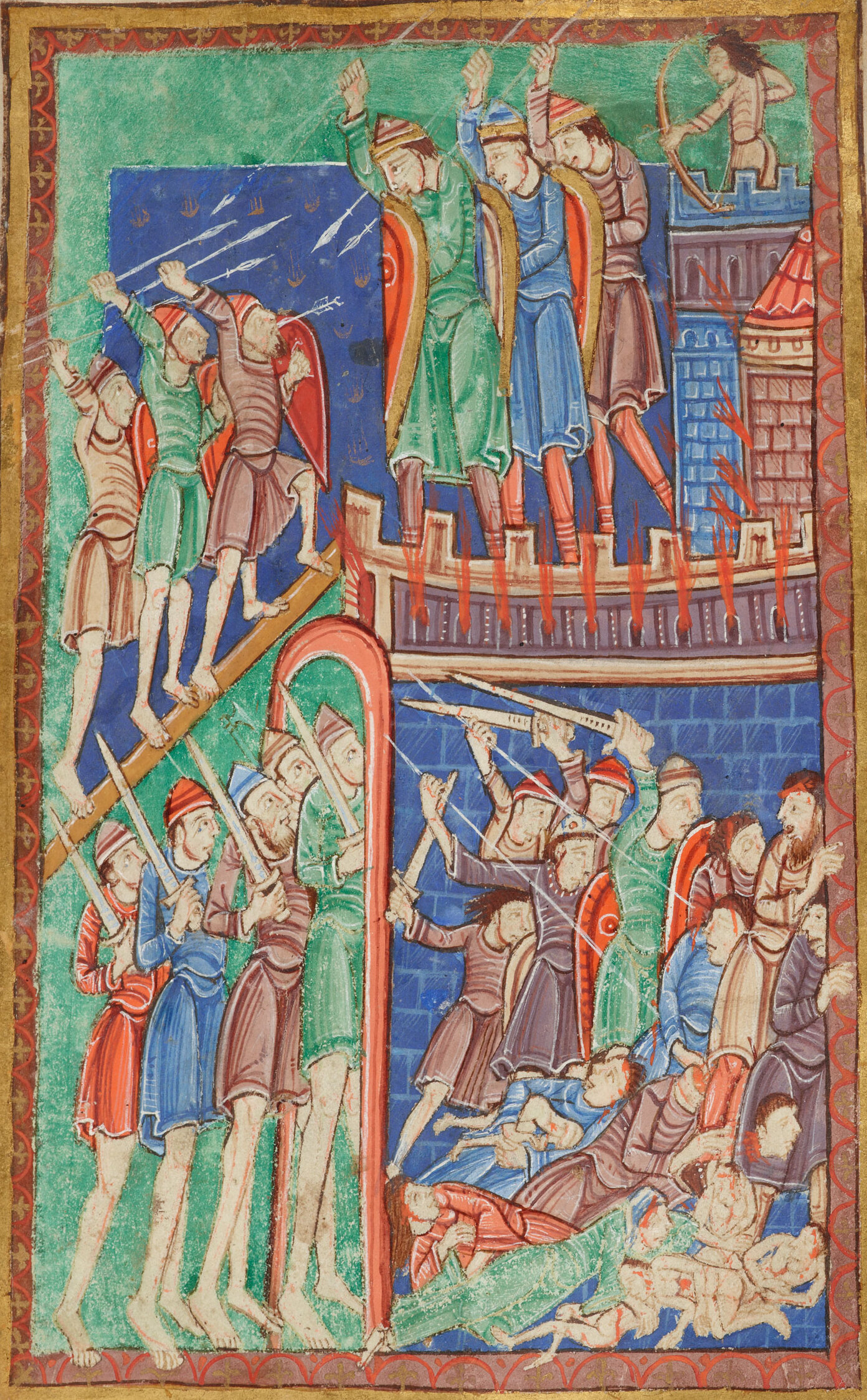
- Vikings killing townspeople, including children; 12th-century miniature
- Born: Norway
- Occupation: Early 9th-century Viking
- Children: Steinolf, Einar, and Steinmod
- Father: Einar

Olvir the Child-Sparer (Old Norse: Ölvir barnakarl) was a Norwegian Viking known from Old Norse written sources. In the Book of Settlements, he is described as a famous man and a great Viking. His descendants participated in the settlement of Iceland. According to tradition, Olvir opposed the killing of children and would not allow them to be thrown onto spear-points, earning him the byname “the Child-Sparer”. Some scholars have regarded this explanation of the byname as credible or plausible, while others have associated it with Olvir having numerous descendants.

== Biography and family ==
The American Germanic philologist Paul R. Peterson dates Olvir to the early 9th century. In the Book of Settlements, he is described as a famous man in Norway and a "great Viking". The Icelandic historian Bogi Thorarensen Melsteð gives his full name as Old Norse: Ölvir barnakarl Einarsson; the patronymic Einarsson indicates that his father was named Einar.

Peterson identifies Olvir as an ancestor of several prominent Icelandic settlers. According to the Book of Settlements, Olvir's sons were Steinolf, Einar, and Steinmod. Steinolf was the father of Una, who married Thorbjorn the Salmoner. Einar was the father of Ofeig Grettir and Oleif the Broad, whose son was Thormod Skapti; Steinmod was the father of Konal. Olvir's descendants participated in the settlement of Iceland; Ofeig Grettir and Thormod Skapti were granted land in Gnupverjahrepp. In Njáls saga, Olvir is also mentioned as an ancestor in a genealogy.

== Byname ==
Olvir's Old Norse byname, barnakarl, is glossed by Peterson as “children's man” or “friend of children”. It is rendered as “the Child-Sparer” in the English translation of the Book of Settlements. The source explains that he received the name because he refused to allow children to be thrown onto the points of spears, a practice that the text attributes to the Vikings. The scholar of Old Icelandic literature Finnur Jónsson rendered the byname in Danish as Börne-karl (“children's man”) and argued that there was no reason to doubt the account in the Book of Settlements. The Icelandic philologist and bibliographer Halldór Hermannsson compared the account with medieval reports of the killing of children and other wartime atrocities, concluding that the explanation given in the Book of Settlements was not implausible.

The Canadian philologist Ian McDougall characterized the explanation in the Book of Settlements as a folk etymology based on a recurring motif in medieval literature in which Vikings and members of other peoples threw children onto spear points. As an example, he cited an account in the chronicle associated with John of Worcester describing the Danish capture of Canterbury during the siege of 1011. According to the chronicler, infants were torn from their mothers' breasts and caught on the points of spears. McDougall rejected the interpretation connecting Olvir's byname with such incidents. Following the Swedish philologist and onomastician Erik Henrik Lind, he instead associated the byname with Olvir's numerous descendants. Peterson likewise considered Lind's interpretation possibly correct.

== Sources ==
=== Primary sources ===
- Florence of Worcester (2010), The Chronicle: With the Two Continuations: Comprising Annals of English History, from the Departure of the Romans to the Reign of Edward I, translated by Forester, Thomas, Piscataway, New Jersey: Gorgias Press, ISBN 978-1-61719-424-5
- The Book of Settlements: Landnámabók, translated by Pálsson, Hermann; Edwards, Paul, Winnipeg: University of Manitoba Press, 2007, ISBN 978-0-88755-698-2

=== Secondary sources ===
- Budal, Ingvil Brügger (2021), "Words, Wisdom, and Whetting: Intelligence and Bynames in Brennu-Njáls saga", Projet Épopée (7)
- Hermannsson, Halldór (1920), "Viðurnefnið "barnakarl"", Árbók Hins íslenzka fornleifafélags (in Icelandic), 35: 3–7
- Jónsson, Finnur (1908), "Tilnavne i den islandske oldlitteratur", Aarbøger for Nordisk Oldkyndighed og Historie (in Danish), Copenhagen
- McDougall, Ian (1993), "Serious entertainments: an examination of a peculiar type of Viking atrocity", Anglo-Saxon England, 22: 201–225, doi:10.1017/S0263675100004385
- Melsteð, Bogi Thorarensen (1903), Íslendinga saga (in Icelandic), vol. 1, Copenhagen: Hið íslenska bókmenntafélag
- Peterson, Paul R. (2015), Old Norse Nicknames (PhD dissertation), Minneapolis: University of Minnesota
