= Cyril Jackson =

Cyril Jackson may refer to:

- Cyril Jackson (priest) (1746–1819), Dean of Christ Church, Oxford 1783–1809
- Cyril Jackson (educationist) (1863–1924), British educationist
- Cyril Jackson (astronomer) (1903–1988), South African astronomer
- Cyril Jackson (broadcaster) (1908-1982), British BBC employee
