= Ida Gordon =

British academic

Ida Lilian Gordon (née Pickles)
- Born: 14 November 1907; Sandal Magna, West Riding of Yorkshire, England
- Died: 26 September 2002 (aged 94); Rosemarkie, Scotland
- Occupations: Academic, philologist
- Writing career
- Subject: Philology

Ida Lilian Gordon (born Sandal Magna 14 November 1907, died Rosemarkie 26 September 2002) was a British academic, specialising in Medieval English and Old Norse.

== Life ==
Ida took her BA in English at Leeds University from 1925–28, and completed her PhD there in 1930: 'A typographical study of the sagas of the Vestfirðir: Gull-Þórissaga, Gíslasaga, Hávarðarsaga, Fóstbrœðrasaga and of their traditions'. In 1930, she married E. V. Gordon, Leeds's Professor of English Language, with whom she had four children (the eldest of whom, Bridget Mackenzie, went on to lecture in Old Norse at Glasgow University). J. R. R. Tolkien composed the couple a long Old English praise-poem in the Old Norse drottkvætt-metre, entitled Brýdleop, as a wedding present.

Ida Gordon moved with her husband to Manchester on his appointment as Smith Professor of English Language and Germanic Philology at the University of Manchester. On his death in 1938, and with four children under the age of seven to support, she took on some of his teaching duties, working as a Lecturer until 1960, when she was promoted to Senior Lecturer. She retired in 1968. She visited Iceland twice, and in 1970 was a visiting professor at the University of Victoria, British Columbia.

== Works and archives ==
=== Archives ===
In 2014, Ida's eldest daughter Bridget Mackenzie sold a collection of letters written variously to Ida and to her husband by J. R. R. Tolkien to the Brotherton Library of the University of Leeds. Mackenzie passed Ida and Eric Gordon's books to St Andrews University Library.

=== Books ===
- Pearl, ed. by E. V. Gordon (Oxford: Clarendon Press, 1953) (although credited to E. V. Gordon, Ida worked substantially on this after his death as well as seeing the work through the press)
- The Seafarer, ed. by I. L. Gordon, Methuen's Old English Library (New York: Appleton-Century-Crofts, 1960)
- The Double Sorrow of Troilus: A Study of Ambiguities in 'Troilus and Criseyde' (Oxford: Clarendon Press, 1970)

=== Articles ===
- 'The Murder of Thorgrímr in Gíslasaga Súrssonar’, Medium Ævum, 3.2 (June 1934), 79-94
- 'The Origins of Gíslasaga’, Saga-Book, 13.3 (1949–50), 183-205
- 'Traditional Themes in The Wanderer and The Seafarer’, Review of English Studies, n. s. 5 (1954), 225-35
- 'Oral Tradition and the Sagas of Poets', in Studia centenalia in honorem memoriae Benedikt S. Thorarinson, ed. by B. S. Benedikz (Reykjavík: Typis Isafoldianis, 1961), 69-76
- 'The Narrative Function of Irony in Chaucer's Troilus and Criseyde’, in Medieval Miscellany Presented to Eugène Vinaver, ed. by F. Whitehead, A. H. Diverres, and F. E. Sutcliffe (Manchester: Manchester University Press, 1965), 146-56
- trans., The Dream of the Rood (Rosemarkie: Groam House Museum, 1993)
