= A. R. Taylor =

British linguistic scholar (1913–1993)

Arnold Rodgers Taylor
- Taylor in July 1956
- Born: 28 April 1913; Norton-on-Tees, County Durham
- Died: 30 May 1993 (aged 80); England
- Occupations: Academic, philologist
- Writing career
- Subjects: Philology, Icelandic

Arnold Rodgers Taylor (1913–1993) was a scholar of medieval English, Old Norse, and modern Icelandic.

== Early life and education ==
Taylor was the youngest of the four children of Arthur Harry Taylor, from Burnham in Norfolk, and Elizabeth Rodgers, from Stockton, Norfolk. After graduating from high school in Stockton, Taylor read English at the University of Manchester (St. Anselm Hall), graduating in 1934. Under the influence of E. V. Gordon, he spent the spring of 1933 as an exchange student in Iceland. In 1934 he took his MA at Manchester, writing on Droplaugarsona saga, and then spent a further year there gaining a teaching certificate. During these years, he continued to spend much of his time in Iceland, meeting his future wife Sigríður Ásgeirsdóttir (1911–91) there in 1935.

After holding a substitute teaching position in Ashton under Lyne in 1937, Taylor went to Germany as an assistant professor of English at the University of Jena from 1937 to 1939, followed by a year of high-school teaching at Darlington.

== Second World War ==
With the outbreak of war, Arnold volunteered his German skills to the British army, but with an even greater lack of soldiers knowing Icelandic, he was posted to Iceland in 1941. In 1941 he met Sigríður again, and they married in Reykjavík on 14 May 1942, both moving to England later that year. They had a daughter, Jennifer, though she would not meet her father until she was three years old, and later a son, Ronald. Arnold continued both to fight and translate in North Africa, Italy, Belgium and the Netherlands until the summer of 1946, when he returned to high-school teaching in County Durham.

== University of Leeds ==
In January 1947 Arnold began the career which dominated his life, gaining a lectureship in the English Department at the University of Leeds, where he succeeded Bruce Dickins (who had himself succeeded Arnold's tutor E. V. Gordon when Gordon left Leeds for Manchester) in teaching medieval English, Old Norse and modern Icelandic Studies. He became a senior lecturer in 1956 and retired in 1978 (when he was succeeded by Rory McTurk). From 1952 to 1954 he was President of The Viking Society for Northern Research. He became a Knight of the Icelandic Order of the Falcon in 1963, and in 1978 a Knight Commander of the order.

Taylor is best known for his 1957 revision of Gordon's An Introduction to Old Norse, which remained the main textbook in Old Norse in the Anglophone world into the twenty-first century. He also produced an Icelandic-English Pocket Dictionary (Reykjavík: Orðabókarútgáfan, 1956) and a number of articles, though ill health hampered his writing.

== Death ==
Taylor died in England 30 May 1993. In accordance with his last wishes, he was granted burial in Icelandic soil beside his wife, at Blönduós.
