= Viking Club =

The Viking Club was a club for philologists and historians specializing in Germanic and Scandinavian studies.

== Foundation ==
The origins of the Club lie with E.V. Gordon and J. R. R. Tolkien when the two were professors at Leeds University in the 1920s. Its emergence was described thus by Tolkien in a letter of 25 June 1925:

during this last session a course of voluntary reading of texts not specially considered in the current syllabus has attracted more than fifteen students, not all of them from the linguistic side of the department. Philology, indeed, appears to have lost for these students its connotations of terror if not of mystery. An active discussion-class has been conducted, on lines more familiar in schools of literature than of language, which has borne fruit in friendly rivalry and open debate with the corresponding literary assembly. A Viking Club has even been formed, by past and present students of Old Icelandic, which promises to carry on the same kind of activity independently of the staff.

Christina Scull and Wayne G. Hammond judged that the Club was founded "probably in 1922", while Alaric Hall has situated its foundation in the academic year 1924–1925.

== Activities ==
At meetings of the club students and faculty would gather to read Old Icelandic sagas and drink together in an informal setting. Members of the club also invented original songs and poems in Old English, Gothic, Old Norse and other Germanic languages. Cyril Jackson, who studied English and Old Norse at the University from 1926 to 1929, described the club in a letter auctioned in 2003 into private ownership along with Jackon's copy of Songs for the Philologists as "boozy evenings in the Senior Staff Common Room, where [...] we sang those songs to nursery rhyme tunes". J. R. R. Tolkien, who at that time had recently left Leeds for Oxford, would sometimes return, "when we naturally had a 'party'. After an unreasonable amount of ale [Tolkien's] declamation of bits of Beowulf and the Battle of Maldon was magnificent".

Following Gordon's departure from Leeds to Manchester University in 1931, the Leeds student magazine The Gryphon remarked that 'old students will note with pleasure that Dr. A. H. Smith is now President of the Viking Club’, indicating that the student society that Tolkien and Gordon had established had in some sense survived Gordon's departure and was in the hands of Albert Hugh Smith (1903–67), a Leeds graduate who in 1930 had taken up a lectureship at University College London. Under Smith's auspices, a collection of the songs sung by the Viking Club was privately printed in 1936 as Songs for the Philologists.

== Successors ==
Similar groups have continued at Leeds University since the time of Tolkien and Gordon. As of 2015 the successor of the Viking Club was known as the Old Norse Reading Group, and associated with Gordon's distant successor, Alaric Hall.

== See also ==
- Inklings
