= Albert Hugh Smith =

British toponymist (1903–1967)

Albert Hugh Smith OBE (24 February 1903 – 11 May 1967) was a scholar of Old English and Scandinavian languages and played a major part in the study and publication of English place-names.

== Biography ==
=== Early life ===
Hugh Smith was the son of Albert John Smith, a butler, and Anne Smith of Sowerby, West Yorkshire. He was educated at Rishworth School, West Yorkshire, and, after a time working as a railway booking clerk, he went to Leeds University where he was awarded 1st Class BA in English in 1924 and a PhD in 1926. His PhD thesis was on the place-names of the North Riding and the study of place-names remained of continuing interest to him, resulting in several publications. He was Vaughan Fellow at Leeds University from 1924 to 1926, and was then lecturer in English at Saltley College, Birmingham from 1926 to 1928. In 1928 he went to Sweden and was English lecturer at Uppsala University, returning to England in 1930 to University College London (UCL) as a lecturer and reader. In 1932, he became president of the Viking Club, a Leeds student society founded by J. R. R. Tolkien and E. V. Gordon to which he had belonged. In 1937, Smith was awarded a DLit degree at London University.

=== Career ===
During World War II, Smith enlisted in the RAF as an intelligence officer and in 1941 joined the Scientific Intelligence Unit of the Air Ministry under R V Jones, ending with the rank of Wing Commander. He was awarded the OBE for his war-time work in 1947. In 1949 he succeeded Raymond Wilson Chambers as Quain Professor of English at University College London. One of his successors was his former student Randolph Quirk. He was director of Scandinavian studies at UCL from 1946 to 1963. In 1951 he took over the Survey of English Place‑Names, on which work had virtually ceased during the war.

He produced a large number of publications and was also joint editor of Methuen’s series of Old English Library and of the Early English Text Society's Facsimile of The Parker Chronicle and Laws 1941. His interests beyond literature included cricket, horology and mechanical engineering. He built a printing press to demonstrate bibliographical problems, but it was destroyed in the bombing of UCL during the war.

=== Personal life and legacy ===
According to Bridget Mackenzie, daughter of Smith's Leeds University supervisor E. V. Gordon, Smith died of radiation sickness 'due to over-exposure to an infra-red scanner for reading obscure manuscripts: he did not understand the dangers of using it without protection'. He was described in his obituary in the Times as "a most lovable character who appeared to be of more than human stature. He could be maddening alike in matters of scholarship and in personal relations, though one's irritation never lasted long". Randolph Quirk (as RQ) in a follow-up letter referred particularly to his "hospitality and loyalty".

Smith's papers, primarily research notes, were deposited at University College London in 1994 by University's English Department.

He married in 1928 Helen Penelope Tomlinson the daughter of Charles Herbert Tomlinson, grocer of Solihull, and Lucy Florence Tomlinson (née Wilson). They had two children.

== Works ==
- The Place-Names of the North Riding of Yorkshire, English Place-Name Society, 5 (Cambridge: Cambridge University Press, 1928), based on his PhD thesis.
- The Place-Names of the East Riding of Yorkshire and York, English Place-Name Society, 14 (Cambridge: Cambridge University Press, 1937).
- English Place-Name Elements, 2 vols, English Place-Name Society, 25–26 (Cambridge: Cambridge University Press, 1956).
- The Place-Names of the West Riding of Yorkshire, English Place-Name Society, 30–37, 8 vols (Cambridge: Cambridge University Press, 1961–63), part 1, part 2.
- The Place-Names of Gloucestershire, English Place-Name Society, 38–41, 4 vols (Cambridge: Cambridge University Press, 1964–65)
- The Place-Names of Westmorland (1967), 2 volumes.
