= Mantle Childe =

British pianist and arranger

George Mantle-Childe, known as Mantle Childe was a British pianist and arranger of traditional melodies.

== Biography ==
George Mantle-Childe was born on 17 December 1912 in Sutton Coldfield. He started his study of the piano aged four. At age 11, in 1924, he made his first piano broadcast on the BBC; in 1927 he gained a scholarship to the Royal College of Music in London, studying under Leonie Gombrich. He continued his studies in Berlin. He gave several radio recitals for the BBC at their Birmingham studio between the wars. He was the piano soloist with the City of Birmingham Orchestra for various Bach concertos. His Sextet was broadcast in 1934, performed by himself, with Victor Fleming leading the sextet. He is known for his "Child's Play" for young musicians, and for his settings of "Lazy Sheep" to an old French melody in 1947 and "Suo Gan" to a Welsh lullaby tune in 1949. He gave numerous concerts in different countries. He became a professor at the Guildhall School of Music, and head of the Conservatory of Music in London. He did not marry. He made no recordings of his performances.

== Legacy ==
"Lazy Sheep" was used in the 1936 Songs for the Philologists as the melody for J. R. R. Tolkien's poem "Bagme Bloma", written in the Gothic language.

== Works ==
- Childe, Mantle. Lazy sheep: a pianoforte solo based on an old French melody. Oxford University Press, 1947.
- Childe, Mantle. Suo-gan (Welsh lullaby): for piano. Oxford University Press, 1949.
- Childe, Mantle. Technical Aids to the Playing of Scales, Broken Chords, and Arpeggios. Oxford University Press, 1961.
