= Guðmundur Andri Thorsson =

Icelandic author

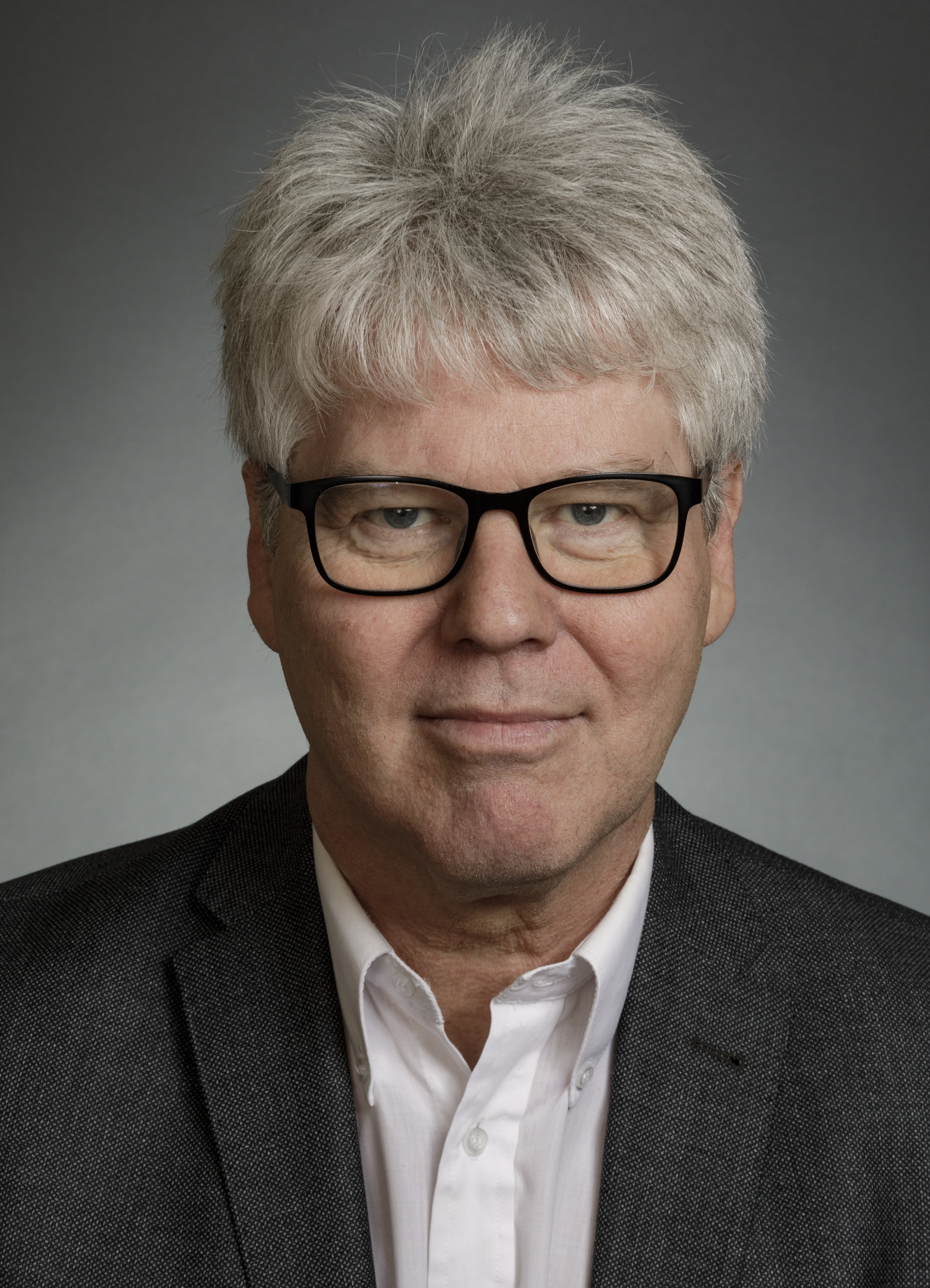
Guðmundur Andri Thorsson 2017

Guðmundur Andri Thorsson is an editor, critic, and author born in Iceland on 31 December 1957. He received his degree in literature in 1983 from the University of Iceland. His first work was as a literary critic in the 1980s.

His first novel, Mín káta angist, came out in 1988 and he has had three more novels published since then. He has also written several articles collected into a book. In 2013 his novel Sæmd was nominated for the Icelandic Literary Prize.

== Major works ==
- Mín káta angist, novel, 1988.
- Íslenski draumurinn, novel, 1991.
- Íslandsförin, novel, 1996.
- Ég vildi að ég kynni að dansa, articles, 1998.
- Náðarkraftur, novel, 2003.
- Stutt ágrip af sögu traktorsins á úkraínsku, novel, translated from Marina Lewycka, via English, 2006
- Tveir húsvagnar, novel, translated from Marina Lewycka, via English, 2007
- Segðu mömmu að mér líði vel, novel, 2008.
- Valeyrarvalsinn, story-cycle, 2011.
- Sæmd, novel about Benedikt Sveinbjarnarson Gröndal, 2013
- Og svo tjöllum við okkur í rallið : bókin um Thor, biography, 2015
- Hæg breytileg átt, poetry, 2016
