= Björnen sover =

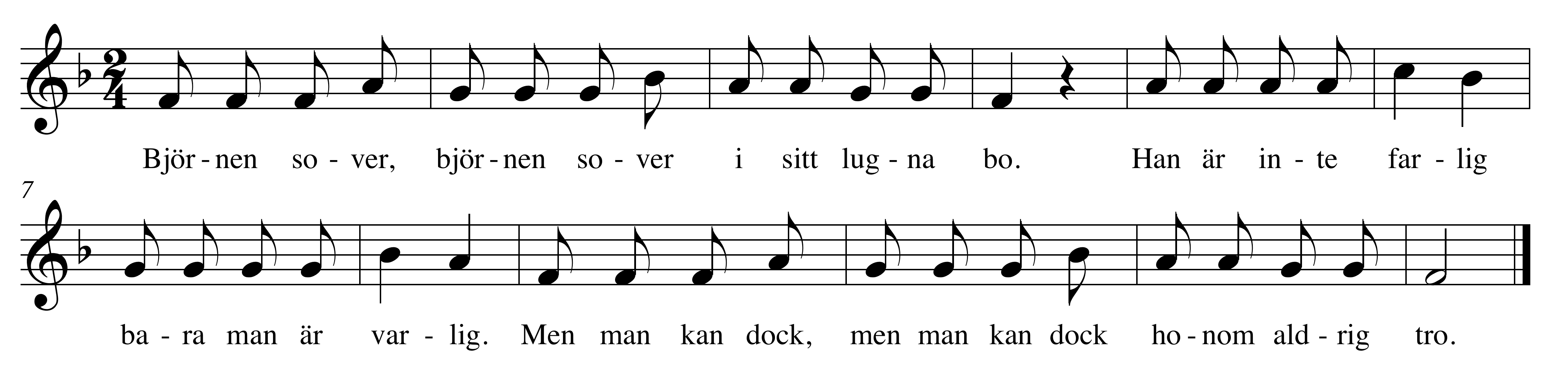
- Lyrics and tune.

Song

Björnen sover performed by Svea Jansson in June 1960. Documented by Matts Arnberg.

.

Björnen sover is a Swedish singing game, used both as a round dance and a children's song. The tune is a simplified version of the one used for Gubben Noak, published by Carl Michael Bellman, published in Songs of Fredman in 1792. Still today (1999), research hasn't proved if Bellman wrote the tune or not. Since it became famous, the tune been used for several different lyrics in the centuries since Bellman, including many children's songs.

== The game ==
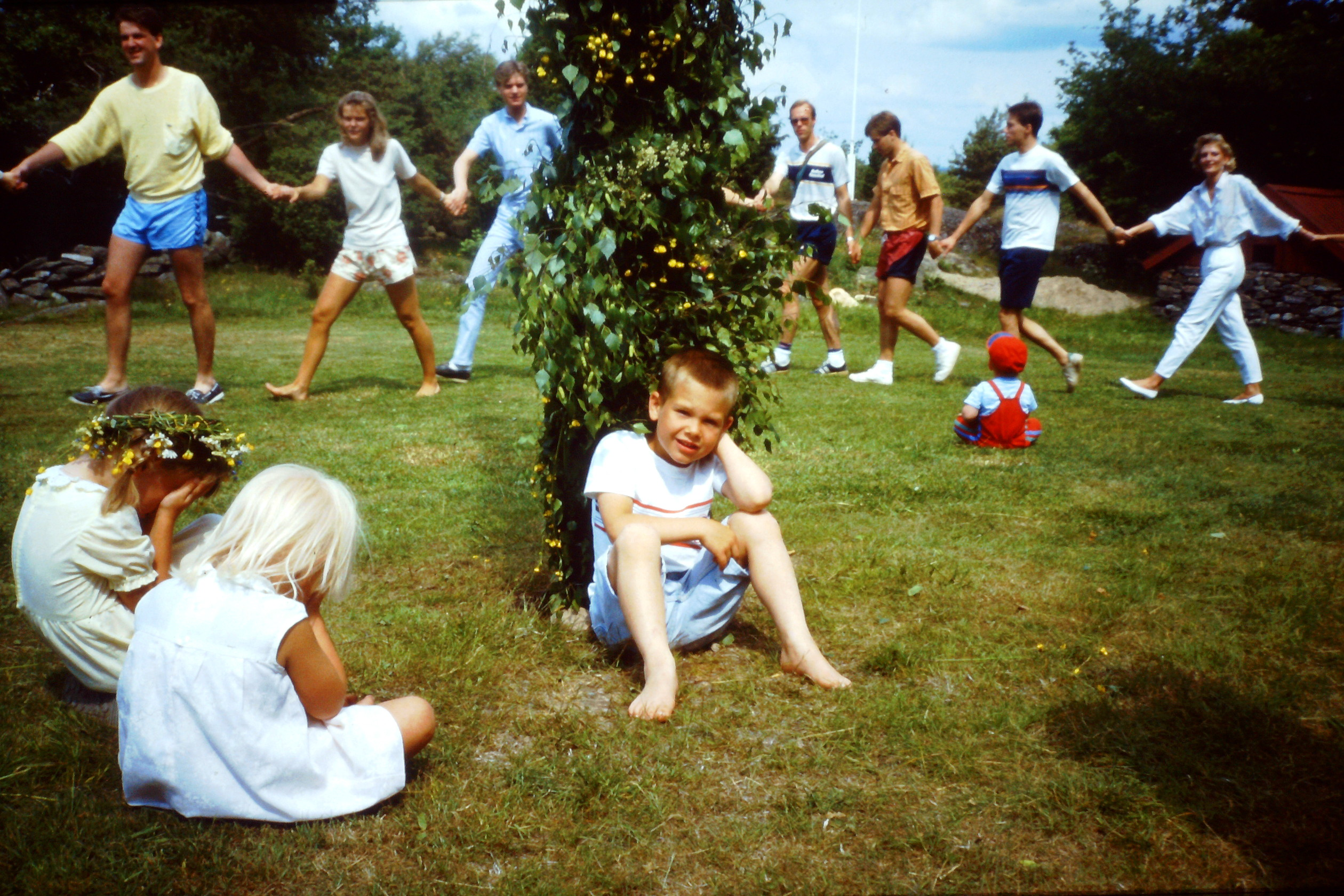
Midsummer dance to Björnen sover in Årsnäs in Sweden in June 1985.

1. One person is appointed to act as bear, taking cover and pretending to sleep
2. Other participants walk around the "bear" in a ring, singing Björnen sover (the "bear is sleeping").
3. At the end of the song, the bear "wakes up", and begins to chase the other participants.
4. The one caught first acts as the "bear" the next time, or is knocked out of the game.

== Russia and the USSR ==
Because Russia and the USSR sometimes have been called the Russian Bear the term björnen sover ("the bear sleeps") has in Swedish sometimes referred to times in international politics when Russia has attracted less attention, but not everyone is trusting them.

== Recordings ==
An early recording was done by Anita Lindman for the 1967 album Barnkalaset med tant Anita.

== Sources ==
- Palm, Anders; Stenström, Johan, eds. (1999). Barnens svenska sångbok [Children's Swedish Songbook] (in Swedish). Stockholm: Albert Bonniers Förlag. ISBN 91-0-057050-8.
