= The Mermaid (ballad) =

Traditional song

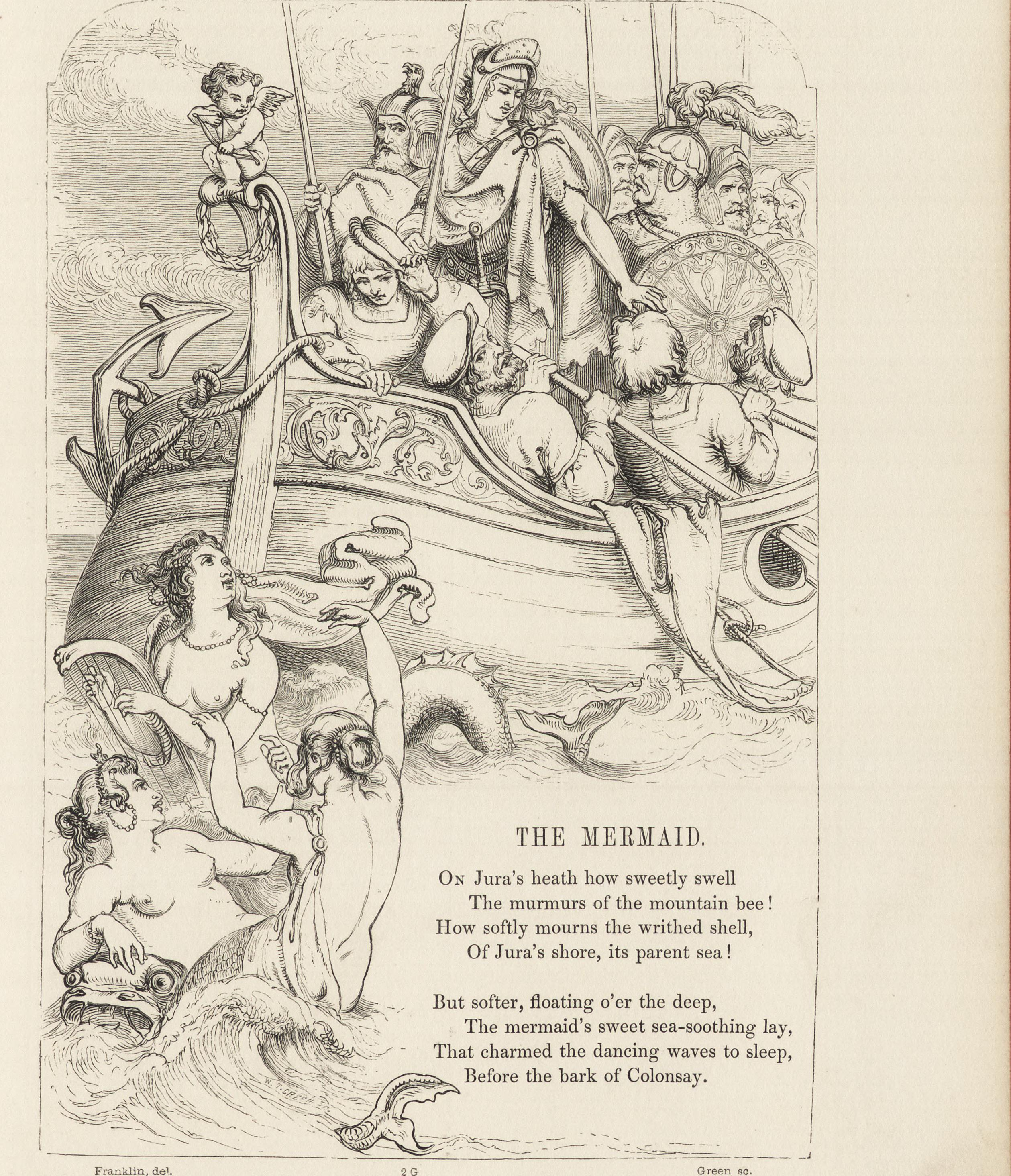
The Mermaid from The Book of British Ballads (1842)

"The Mermaid" (Roud 124, Child 289) is a traditional folk ballad. Originating around the mid-18th century, this song is known by a number of names, including "Waves on the Sea", "The Stormy Winds", "Our Gallant Ship", and "The Wrecked Ship".

The song belongs in the category of sea ballads, being a song sailors sung during their time off and not while they worked, but is more commonly thought of as a sea shanty. It is well known in American folk tradition as well as European traditions, and the text has appeared in many forms in both print and oral mediums. The ballad remains part of American culture as a song sung at camps operated by Scouting America as well as in public school music education classes.

== Synopsis ==
The ballad describes a ship that left port, its misadventure and eventual sinking. The moral of the song is that mermaids are a sign of an impending shipwreck. It is sung from the point of view of a member of the ship's crew, although the ship sinks without any survivors. In most versions the ship is unnamed but in a version sung by Almeda Riddle, the mermaid disappears and the ship is identified as the Merrymac. Often the ship is said to be departing on a Friday morning, but there are other versions of the lyrics including one that has it leaving on a Saturday night. On the way out to sea, the captain sees a mermaid with a "comb and a glass in her hand".

Three parallel stanzas most often follow describing how three of the crew members, contemplating impending disaster, would rather be somewhere else than on the ocean floor; for example, the cook would rather be with his pots and pans. In English versions crew members often identify their home port and the people (parents, wives, children) who will mourn for them.

The home of the crew members varies from version to version, but it has been assigned to almost every port town in Britain and the East Coast of the United States. At the end of the ballad the ship turns around three times and sinks with all hands; there are no survivors.

Between each of the verses there oftentimes is a chorus describing the conditions sailors face in a storm and the state of the sea that was caused by the mermaid.

== Legacy ==
Robert Louis Stevenson cited this as "the dolorous old naval ballad" in his youthful work "Crabbed Age and Youth":

We sail in leaky bottoms and on great and perilous waters; and to take a cue from the dolorous old naval ballad, we have heard the mermaidens singing, and know that we shall never see dry land any more. Old and young, we are all on our last cruise.

The philologist and fantasy author J. R. R. Tolkien wrote a song in Old English, to be sung to the tune of The Mermaid.

First verse of one of J. R. R. Tolkien's Old English Songs for the Philologists
Ofer wídne gársecg

Þa ofer wídne gársecg wéow unwidre ceald,
Sum hagusteald on lagu féoll on nicera geweald.
He legde lást swa fýres gnást, he snúde on sunde fléah,
Oþþæt he métte meremenn déopan grunde néah.

Across the broad ocean (prose translation)

When the cold blast was blowing across the broad ocean,
a young man fell into the sea, into the power of nixies.
As fast as fire he made his way, he swam along so quickly –
until he met the mermen near the deep sea-bottom.

The Mermaid

Oh 'twas in the broad Atlantic, mid the equinoctial gales
That a young fellow fell overboard among the sharks and whales
And down he went as a streak of light, so quickly down went he
Until he came to a mermaid at the bottom of the deep blue sea.

== See also ==
- List of the Child Ballads

== References and bibliography ==
- Atkinson, David (1998). "The Child Ballads from England and Wales in the James Madison Carpenter Collection". Folk Music Journal. 7 (4).
- Cazden, Norman; Haufrecht, Herbert; Studer, Norman (1983). Folk Songs of the Catskills. State University of New York Press. ISBN 0-87395-580-3.
- Hilcourt, Bill (August 1961). "Green Bar Bill Says: Keep Your Feet Dry". Boys' Life. Boy Scouts of America.
- Nelson-Burns, Lesley. "The Mermaid".
- Niles, John Jacob (2000). The Ballad Book of John Jacob Niles. University Press of Kentucky. ISBN 0813109876.
- Roud, Steve; Bishop, Julia (2012). The New Penguin Book of English Folk Songs. London: Penguin Classic. ISBN 978-0141194615.
