= Sveinbjörn Egilsson =

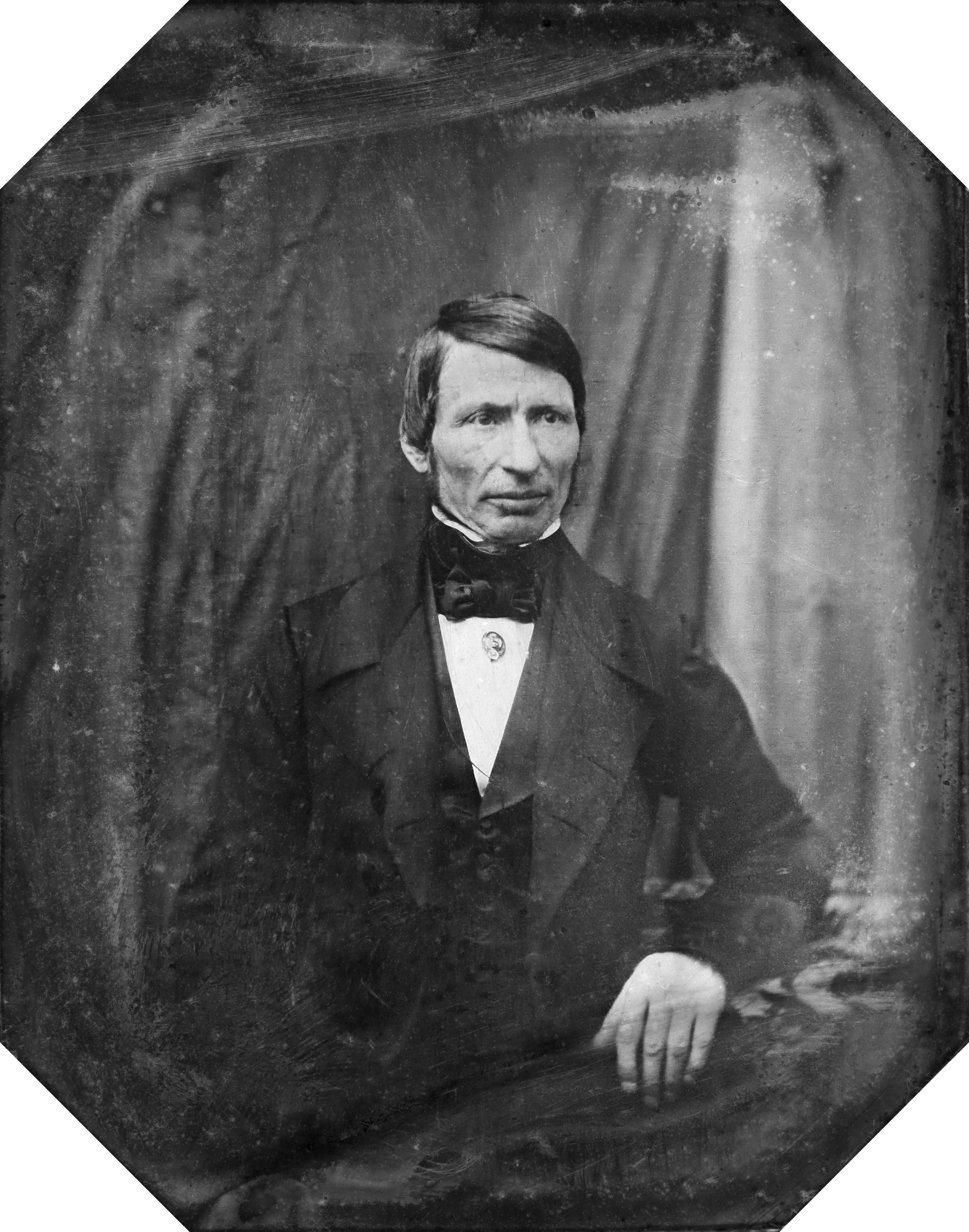
Sveinbjörn Egilsson in 1850

Sveinbjörn Egilsson (Icelandic pronunciation: [ˈsveinˌpjœrtn̥ ˈeijɪlˌsɔːn]; 24 February 1791 – 17 August 1852) was an Icelandic theologian, classicist, teacher, translator and poet. He is best known for the work he did during his time as the rector of The Learned School of Reykjavík (Lærði skólinn í Reykjavík), particularly his translations of Homer's Odyssey and Iliad into Icelandic.

== Life ==
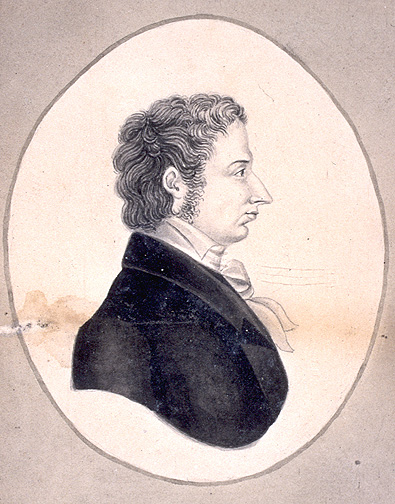
Sveinbjörn Egilsson. Sketch by Norwegian historian Rudolf Keyser made during his stay in Iceland from 1825 to 1827.

Sveinbjörn was born in Innri-Njarðvík in Gullbringusýsla, Iceland. He was the son of Egill Sveinbjarnarson, a little-known but wealthy farmer. Sveinbjörn was fostered by Magnús Stephensen and was educated by a number of different individuals. In 1810 he graduated from the tutelage of Árni Helgason and started his studies in theology at the University of Copenhagen in 1814, completing his degree in 1819. Returning to Iceland, he received a position at Bessastaðaskóli, and when the school moved to Reykjavík he was made rector. He was a founding member of the Royal Nordic Society of Antiquaries.

When troubles arose in the school, with students protesting their treatment ("The Pereat"), Sveinbjörn left for Copenhagen to seek the assistance of Danish educational authorities. Although he received their support, he left his position as rector in 1851 and died a year later.

Sveinbjörn was married to Helga Gröndal, daughter of high judge Benedikt Gröndal the elder.

== Works ==
=== Translations ===
His main subject as a teacher was Greek. During his position at the school, he worked on a number of translations, translating amongst other things Plato's Meno and Homer's Odyssey and Iliad into Icelandic.

For the Society of Antiquaries, he translated the Icelandic sagas into Latin: Scripta historica Islandorum. Later he compiled a dictionary of Icelandic skaldic language, Lexicon Poëticum, which formed the basis of future scholarship concerning ancient Icelandic poetry.

He also translated the Prose Edda into Latin and published the original text along with clarifications and comments.

When Sveinbjörn died, he was working on a poetic translation of Homer's Iliad into Icelandic. His son, Benedikt Sveinbjarnarson Gröndal the younger, finished the task. His prose translations are still the only readily available Icelandic versions of the Iliad and Odyssey.

=== Original works ===
Sveinbjörn wrote a number of well-known Icelandic poems and hymns, including the lyrics to the Icelandic Christmas carol Heims um ból.

== Other sources ==
- Finnbogi Gudmundson (1969). Sveinbjörn Egilsson og Carl Christian Rafn (in Danish). Odense Universitetsforlag. OCLC 256682724.
