= An Introduction to Old Norse =

- Author: E. V. Gordon
- Language: English with Old Norse texts
- Subject: Old Norse, Language
- Genre: Textbook
- Publisher: The Clarendon Press
- Publication date: 1927
- Pages: 412

An Introduction to Old Norse is a textbook written by E. V. Gordon, arising from his teaching at the University of Leeds and first published in 1927 in Oxford at The Clarendon Press. The Second Edition was revised (1957) by A. R. Taylor, Gordon's former student and, indirectly, his Leeds successor. It was most recently reprinted in 1990 by the Oxford University Press. According to Todd Krause of the Linguistics Research Centre at the University of Texas, the work is "still considered the standard reference, though often extremely daunting for self-study."

== Overview ==
An Introduction to Old Norse is commonly accepted as a standard text in the English-speaking world for studying Old Norse. It includes a long introduction, a short grammar of Old Norse, a glossary, an index of names and selections from the Poetic Edda as well as a number of other sagas (all in Old Norse).

The introduction of the text traces the literary history of Old Norse and describes the literary merits, historical accuracy, and compositional style of Old Norse texts. In it, Gordon draws comparisons to other languages and texts of the Middle Ages such as the Old English epic poem Beowulf.

The central part of the book is composed of selections of Old Norse texts, including the entire text of Hrafnkels saga in the Second Edition. Other selections include the poem "Þrymskviða" and parts of Hrólfs saga kraka. Both East Norse and West Norse are represented, and there are also runic inscriptions.

The grammar portion of the text is written with the understanding that the reader would be familiar with linguistics, particularly those of Germanic languages. Verb conjugations are given in accordance with stem class, and Gordon often gives the historical reasons for particular changes in word form. There are also notes on the text selections, particularly glosses of difficult lines, as well as notes on differences between branches of Old Norse, both phonologically and in writing.

It includes a comprehensive glossary that often includes cross-references to specific paradigm numbers, including a portion of names that occur within the selected readings. Various illustrations occur throughout, typically of Norsemen and Scandinavian-related halls, weapons, etc.

== The readings ==
Although the second edition of An Introduction to Old Norse is still under copyright, the first edition is in the public domain in the US, UK, and Europe. The readings of Old Norse passages are not under copyright. A copy of all of the readings in Old Norse from the book is available online.

== Reviews ==
- Beck, Richard (November 1928), "An Introduction To Old Norse by E. V. Gordon", Scandinavian Studies and Notes (review), 10 (4), University of Illinois Press on behalf of the Society for the Advancement of Scandinavian Study: 117–119, JSTOR 40915263
- Gould, Chester Nathan (May 1928), "An Introduction to Old Norse by E. V. Gordon", Modern Philology (review), 25 (4), The University of Chicago Press: 493–495, doi:10.1086/387731, JSTOR 433270
- Einarsson, Stefán (Dec 1928), "An Introduction to Old Norse. by E. W. Gordon", Modern Language Notes (review), 43 (8), The Johns Hopkins University Press: 542–545, doi:10.2307/2914418, JSTOR 2914418

Second edition

- Brown, U. (Apr 1958), "An Introduction to Old Norse by E. V. Gordon, A. R. Taylor", The Modern Language Review (review), 53 (2), Modern Humanities Research Association: 293–294, doi:10.2307/3718243, JSTOR 3718243
- Foote, Peter G. (1958), "An Introduction to Old Norse. Second edition revised by E. V. Gordon, A. R. Taylor", Medium Ævum (review), 27 (3), Society for the Study of Medieval Languages and Literature: 208–209, doi:10.2307/43626761, JSTOR 43626761
- Cowgill, Warren C. (Jan–Mar 1958), "An Introduction to Old Norse by E. V. Gordon", Language (review), 34 (1), Linguistic Society of America: 126–130, doi:10.2307/411289, JSTOR 411289
- Einarsson, Stefán (Jul 1928), "An Introduction to Old Norse by E. W. Gordon", The Journal of English and Germanic Philology (review), 27 (3), University of Illinois Press: 412–424, JSTOR 27703174
- Haugen, Einar (May 1958), "An Introduction to Old Norse by E. V. Gordon, A. R. Taylor", Scandinavian Studies (review), 30 (2), University of Illinois Press on behalf of the Society for the Advancement of Scandinavian Study: 98–102, JSTOR 40916175
