= Linköping University Male Voice Choir =

Linköping University Male Voice Choir (Sw. Linköpings Studentsångare, former Linköpings Studentsångarförening Lihkören) is a Swedish male chorus founded in 1972, based in Linköping. The choir has produced many recordings and performed on national and international TV and radio channels.

The choir has made many tours abroad such as: Denmark in 1980 and 1996 Finland in 1983, 1987, 1990, 1998, 2003 and 2005, United States in 1988, Jordan in 1989, Norway in 1977, 1993, 2001, 2004 and 2008, Great Britain in 1994, 2005, 2007 and 2010, Spain in 1996, Estonia in 1999 and 2014, South Africa in 2000, Macedonia in 2013, and Croatia in 2008.

Conductor and music director since 1979 is Hans Lundgren, director musices at Linköping University.

The choir gained two first prizes in The Third British International Male Voice Choral Festival in May 2007. The conductor was awarded the festival's Conductor's Award.

== Discography ==
- CD1 Christmas songs (1996)
- CD2 Spring and party songs (1996)
- CD3 Swedish male voice choir music (1999)
- CD Musical Engagement (2004)
- CD In English (2013)
