= Bogi Thorarensen Melsteð =

Icelandic historian (1860–1929)

- Born: May 4, 1860; Klausturhólar, Iceland
- Died: November 12, 1929 (aged 69)
- Occupations: historian, politician

Bogi Thorarensen Melsteð (born Klausturhólar 4 May 1860, died 12 November 1929) was an Icelandic historian. He wrote articles and books on Icelandic history. He was Member of the Icelandic Parliament (Althing) for Árnessýsla from 1892 to 1893.

== Early life ==
Melsteð was the son of Jón Melsteð. He graduated from Reykjavík's Lærði skólinn in 1882 and completed his master's degree in history from the University of Copenhagen in 1890. He remained in Copenhagen thereafter.

== Career ==
He was an assistant at the Danish National Archives 1893-1903 and a fellow of the Arnamagnæan Institute for over twenty years. In 1904 he obtained a grant to write a history of Iceland. Along with other Icelandic scholars in Copenhagen, he founded Hið íslenska fræðafélag í Kaupmannahöfn in 1912. He was its president until his death, and the editor of its journal from 1916. By the time of his death, the Society had a fund of 70,000 kroner.

As a member of parliament in 1893, he argued successfully that Iceland's top official must reside there rather than in Denmark.

== Works ==
Among Bogi's books are Saga Íslendinga (1903), Stutt kennslubók í Íslendinga sögu handa byrjendum (1904) and Sögukver handa börnum ásamt nokkrum ættjarðarljóðum og kvæðum (1910). He wrote journal and newspaper articles on Icelandic language, history, education, the co-operative movement and governance.

== Library ==
He owned a large book collection which was bought by the Brotherton Library of the University of Leeds, partly through the ministrations of E. V. Gordon. Bogi donated the majority of the proceeds to a scholarship for Icelandic historians at the university.
