= Benedikt Sveinbjarnarson Gröndal =

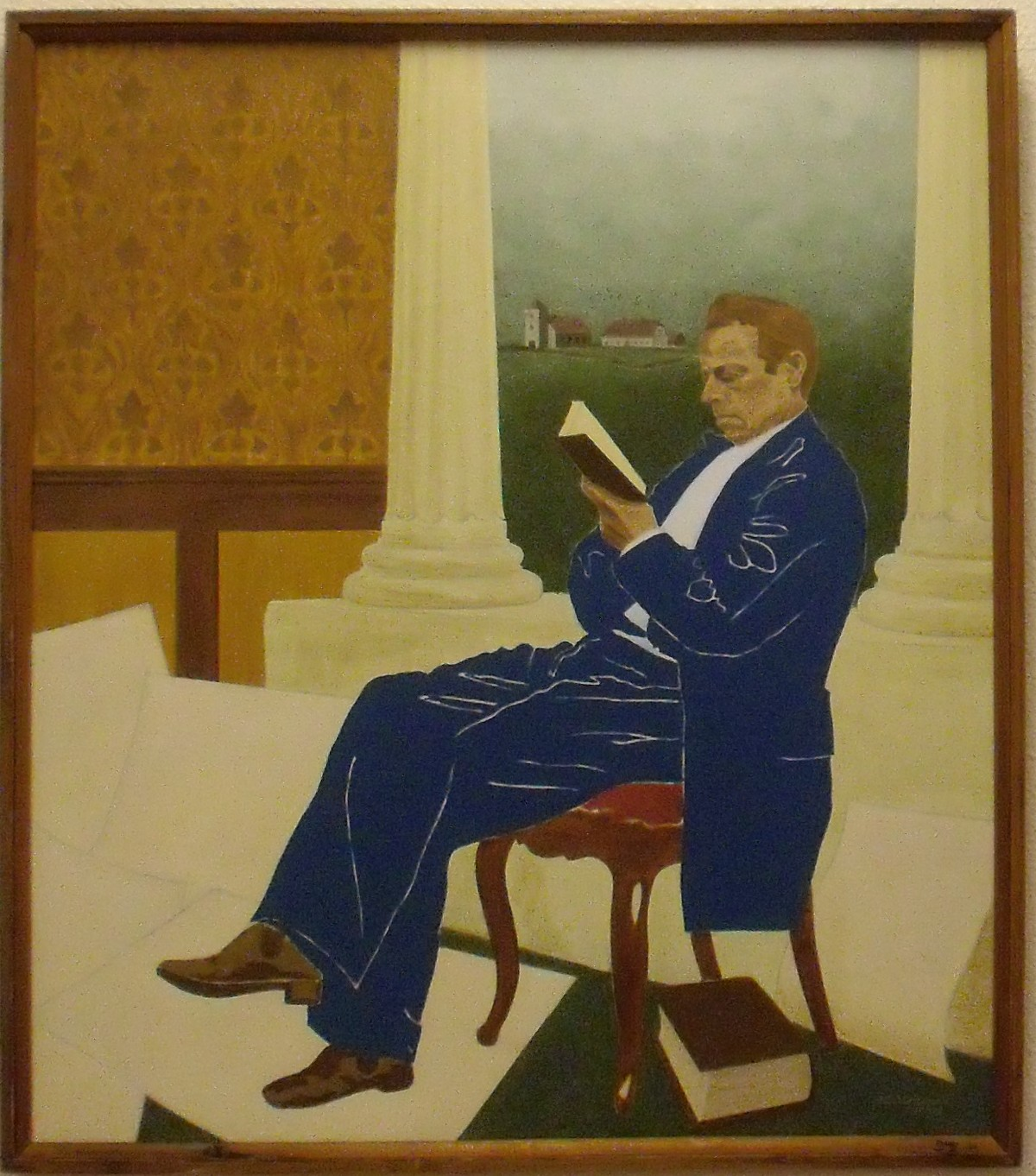
Oil painting of Benedikt by Ólafur Th Ólafsson

Benedikt Sveinbjarnarson Gröndal (Note: Gröndal is sometimes called "Benedikt Gröndal junior" to differentiate him from his grandfather, Benedikt Gröndal the elder, who was a judge and a poet.) (1826–1907) was an Icelandic naturalist, poet, illustrator, and author.

== Biography ==
Gröndal was born in Bessastaðir, which was then a Latin school. His father, Sveinbjörn Egilsson, was the rector.

Gröndal studied at the University of Copenhagen and was the first Icelander to receive a master's degree in Old Norse studies there.

He translated the works of Homer and wrote a satirical poem about the 1859 Battle of Solferino. During his lifetime he was known as a great poet, but his poetry has not remained so popular with modern audiences. He is still known for his comedic prose and for his autobiography Pastime (Dægradvöl). Gröndal was the main character in Guðmundur Andri Thorsson's 2013 novel Sæmd.

He collected biological specimen and wrote textbooks on natural history. He was a self-taught illustrator and made hundreds of drawings of animals and plants. His work Birds of Iceland includes 100 drawings and an overview of all known Icelandic birds.

In 1889, the Icelandic Naturist Society was founded with Benedikt as the director.

Gröndal's residence in central Reykjavík now hosts an exhibition.
