= E. V. Gordon =

Canadian philologist

Eric Valentine Gordon
- Born: 14 February 1896; Salmon Arm, British Columbia, Canada
- Died: 29 July 1938 (aged 42); Manchester, England
- Education: Victoria College, British Columbia; McGill University; University College, Oxford
- Known for: Pioneering research on Old Norse
- Spouse: Ida Lilian Pickles (after 1930)
- Children: 4
- Scientific career
- Fields: Germanic philology
- Workplaces: University of Leeds; Victoria University of Manchester

Eric Valentine Gordon (14 February 1896 – 29 July 1938) was a Canadian philologist, known as an editor of medieval Germanic texts and a teacher of medieval Germanic languages at the University of Leeds and the University of Manchester.

== Early life ==
Gordon was born on Valentine's Day, 1896, on a frontier ranch in Salmon Arm, British Columbia, the third child of Annie McQueen Gordon, a Presbyterian Scot and a teacher, and her husband Jim; they nicknamed Eric "Dal".

At first, Dal was educated by his mother, but a move to Victoria at the age of eleven enabled him to attend Victoria College, British Columbia. In 1915 he was one of the eight Canadian Rhodes Scholars, in his case studying at University College, Oxford. He joined the Canadian Field Artillery in 1916 but was discharged for medical reasons (probably asthma). He worked for the rest of the First World War for the Ministries of National Service and of Food. He also attended McGill University.

Returning to Oxford in 1919, Gordon took a second-class BA in 1920, partly under the tutelage of J. R. R. Tolkien. He began a B Litt degree at Oxford. However, a job opportunity in the English Department at the University of Leeds came up. As the head of department, George S. Gordon wrote to D. Nichol Smith on 18 October 1922, "I am overwhelmed here with students, and have now an Honours School of nearly 120 [...] A committee has been appointed to see what an be done to find me Seminar accommodation, and I am urged to an increase of staff". On 29 October, he continued: "Tolkien suggested a graduate called Gordon,—at present B-Litting. His name is a disadvantage, but we could get over that". E. V. Gordon abandoned his B Litt to take up the position at Leeds.

== University of Leeds ==
Gordon worked at Leeds from 1922 to 1931, introducing first Old Norse and later modern Icelandic to the curriculum. While at Leeds, he wrote his An Introduction to Old Norse (first published 1927) and collaborated with Tolkien, who worked at Leeds from 1920 to 1925, particularly on their edition of Sir Gawain and the Green Knight (first published 1925). After Gordon arrived at Leeds, Tolkien wrote in his diary "Eric Valentine Gordon has come and got firmly established and is my devoted friend and pal." It appears he worked hard at Leeds: in termtime 1923 he was teaching around fifteen hours per week; in one letter of May 1930 he claimed to have worked one hundred and five hours in a single week (admittedly while excusing himself from taking on a new task).

Gordon was promoted to a Professorship of English Language in 1926 following Tolkien's departure and oversaw the University Library's acquisition of the library of Bogi Thorarensen Melsteð, establishing the library as one of the world's best Icelandic collections. Accordingly, for his services to Icelandic culture, Gordon was made a Knight of the Royal Icelandic Order of the Falcon in 1930.

With Tolkien, Gordon also began the Viking Club. In this club they read Old Icelandic sagas (and drank beer) with students and faculty, and invented original Anglo-Saxon songs. A collection of these was privately published as the book Songs for the Philologists. Most of the printed copies were destroyed in a fire and only about 14 are said to exist.

Gordon was active in the Yorkshire Dialect Society, and in 1930 he, with Leeds's Professor of French Paul Barbier, was a founder member of the Yorkshire Society for Celtic Studies, joining its executive committee and pledging £10 over ten years towards the endowment of a lectureship in Celtic Studies at Leeds University. On Gordon's departure from Leeds, he was succeeded by Bruce Dickins. Among Gordon's best Leeds students were the scholars Albert Hugh Smith (whom Gordon gave his notes towards an aborted study of East Yorkshire place-names, which Smith went on to complete); J. A. Thompson, the translator of Halldór Laxness's classic novel Independent People; Stella Marie Mills, who went on to work at the Oxford English Dictionary; and Ida Lilian Pickles, whom he married in 1930. Together they had four children (the eldest of whom, Bridget Mackenzie, went on to lecture in Old Norse at Glasgow University); Tolkien composed them a long Old English praise-poem in the Old Norse drottkvætt-metre, entitled Brýdleop, as a wedding present.

== University of Manchester, and death ==
In 1931, Gordon was made Smith Professor of English Language and Germanic Philology at the University of Manchester where his research focused on Old and Middle English. Among his students was A. R. Taylor, who later succeeded Gordon at Leeds. He died unexpectedly in 1938 of complications following an operation to remove gallstones. After his death, Gordon's widow Ida took on a number of his teaching duties at Manchester, finishing and posthumously publishing a number of his works, before retiring in 1968.

== Select bibliography and archives ==
An extensive bibliography of Gordon's publications can be found in Tolkien the Medievalist, edited by Jane Chance (London: Routledge, 2003), pp. 273–74.

In 2014, the estate of Gordon's eldest daughter Bridget Mackenzie sold a collection of letters to the Brotherton Library of the University of Leeds, written variously to Gordon, his wife Ida and Mackenzie by J. R. R. Tolkien. Mackenzie passed Ida and Eric Gordon's books to St Andrews University Library.

=== Books ===
- 1925 Sir Gawain and the Green Knight, co-edited with J. R. R. Tolkien, Oxford University Press, 211 pp.; Revised edition 1967, Oxford, Clarendon Press, 232 pp.
- 1927 An Introduction to Old Norse, Revised edition 1956, revised by A. R. Taylor; Reprinted 1981, Oxford University Press, USA; 2nd edition
- 1937 The Battle of Maldon
- 1953 Pearl

=== Articles and notes ===
- 'Scandinavian Influence in Yorkshire Dialects', Transactions of the Yorkshire Dialect Society, 4.24 (1923), 5-22
- 'Philology: General Works', in The Year's Work in English Studies, 1922, ed. by Sidney Lee and F. S. Boas (London: Oxford University Press, 1924), 18-24
- 'The Date of Hofuðlausn', Proceedings of the Leeds Philosophical and Literary Society: Literary and Historical Section, 1 (1925), 12-14
- and A. H. Smith, 'The River Names of Yorkshire', Transactions of the Yorkshire Dialect Society, 4.26 (1925), 5-30
- 'Old English Studies', in The Year's Work in English Studies, 1924, ed. by F. S. Boas and C. H. Herford (London: Oxford University Press, 1926), 66-77
- 'Middle English', in The Year's Work in English Studies, 1924, ed. by F. S. Boas and C. H. Herford (London: Oxford University Press, 1926), 78-98
- 'Scarborough and Flamborough', Acta Philologica Scandinavica, 1 (1926–27), 320-23
- 'Old English Studies', in The Year's Work in English Studies, 1925, ed. by F. S. Boas and C. H. Herford (London: Oxford University Press, 1927), 67-82
- 'The Traditions of Kormáks saga’, Transactions of the Philological Society (1931-32), 39-67
- 'The University of Iceland', Universities Review, 5 (1932), 26-30
- 'Introduction', The Saga of Hrolf Kraki, trans. by Stella M. Mills (Oxford: Blackwell, 1933), vii-xii
- and C. T. Onions, 'Notes on the Text and Interpretation of Pearl’, Medium Ævum, 1.2 (September 1932), 126–36, 2.3 (October 1933), 165-88
- ‘Wealhþeow and Related Names', Medium Ævum, 4.3 (September 1935), 169-75
- 'The Date of Æthelred's Treaty with the Vikings: Olaf Tryggvason and the Battle of Maldon', Modern Language Review, 32.1 (January 1937), 24-32
- and Eugène Vinaver, 'New Light of the Text of the Alliterative Morte Arthure’, Medium Ævum, 6.2 (June 1937), 81-98
- 'On Hrafnkels saga Freysgoða’, Medium Ævum, 8.1 (February 1939), 1-32

=== Creative writing and translations ===
- 'The Lay of Attila', Microcosm, 7.4 (Winter 1922), 22-25
- 'A Ballad of Tristram', Gryphon, 4.3 (December 1922), 94 (repr. in Leeds University Verse, 1914-1924, ed. by the English School Association (Leeds: Swan Press, 1924)
- 'The Lay of Thrym', Microcosm, 7.3 (autumn 1922), 3-5
- 'The Lay of Wayland', Microcosm, 8.3 (autumn 1923), 20–23.
- 'A Skald's Impromptu', in A Northern Venture: Verses by Members of the Leeds University English School Association (Leeds: Swan Press, 1923), 6
- 'They Sat There', in A Northern Venture: Verses by Members of the Leeds University English School Association (Leeds: Swan Press, 1923), 7
- 'Sú klukka heljar' and 'When I'm Dead', in Songs for the Philologists, with J. R. R. Tolkien et al. (London: Department of English and University College, 1936), pp. 16, 26.
- trans., Scandinavian Archaeology, by Haakon Shetelig and Hjalmar Falk (Oxford: Clarendon Press, 1937)

== See also ==
- Songs for the Philologists
- Sir Gawain and the Green Knight
- Philology
- J. R. R. Tolkien
- An Introduction to Old Norse
- Archival material at University of Leeds Libraries

== Sources ==
- "Death of Prof. E. V. Gordon". The Guardian. 30 July 1938. p. 11.
