= Half-line =

Half-line may refer to:

- Half-line (geometry), half of a line
- Half-line (unit), half of a line
- The half-way line divides the (soccer) football pitch in two halves
- Alliterative verse#Meter and rhythm, half of a line of poetry
