= Mongol epic poetry =

Genre of Mongol literature

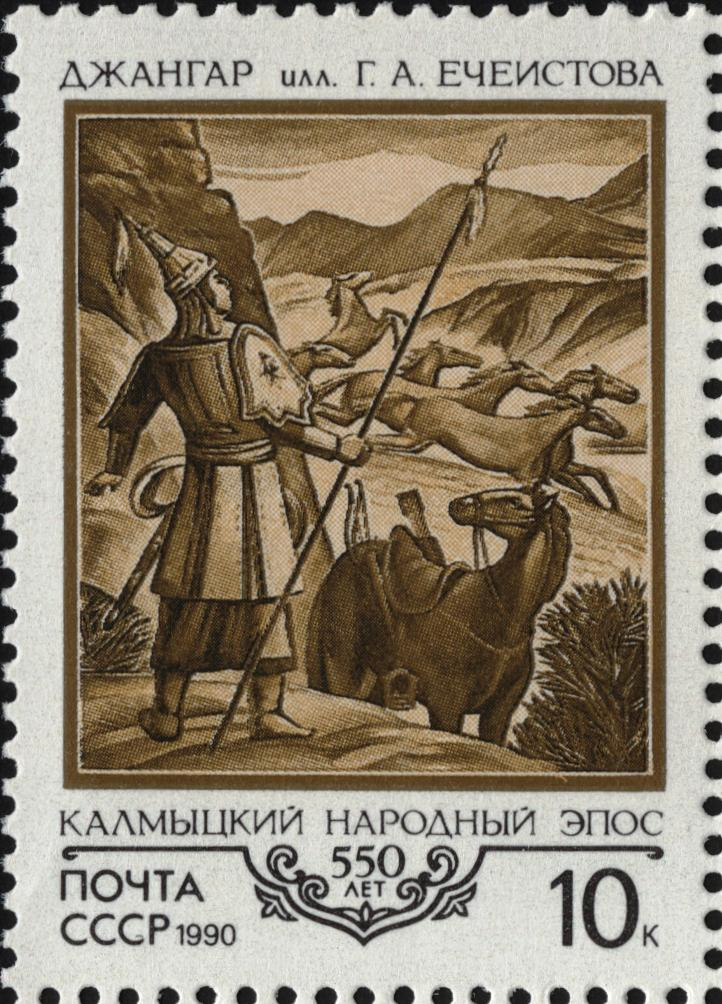
Soviet stamp depicting the Jangar

Epic poetry, or tuuli in Mongolian, is a substantial genre of Mongol oral literature. The two most well-known epics are the Jangar and the Geser. These tuuli are commonly sung with instruments such as the Morin khuur (horse-head fiddle) and the Tovshuur (lute). Most epics describe topics relating to Mongolian history, their ideal worlds and heroes, and the acquisition of new lands. Epics are performed mostly during important events such as celebrations. Mongol epic poetry has, as of 2009, been on the UNESCO List of Intangible Cultural Heritage in Need of Urgent Safeguarding.

Mongol epic poetry has features reminiscent of Germanic alliterative verse.

== History ==
Epics were, until the 17th century, not put in writing. Although epics are still passed down orally, they have been written down, and some performers add to their own performances through reading the written versions of the epics. Epics such as the Geser were passed to the Mongols through writing (the first edition of the epic in Mongolian being published in the 18th century) and then Mongolized to become Mongol epics. The Jangar, too, took its current form sometime in the 18th century with the Kalmyks.

During the Second World War, the government of the Soviet Union promoted the Geser as a way to foster patriotism among Buryats. However, in the years following the war until the death of Joseph Stalin in 1953, the epic tradition was attacked as "feudal" and anti-Russian.

Mongolia under the Mongolian People's Republic suppressed traditional Mongolian culture, and Mongolia experienced rapid globalization, urbanization, and modernization. However, this came at the cost of decreasing popular interest in epics, leading to less experienced epic singers and less performances in the long-run. In order to counteract this, the Mongolian government passed the National Safeguarding Plan of the Mongolian Epic in 2011. As such, they began to collaborate with NGOs to hold epic performance competitions, give epic singers awards, recognition and money, and promote social awareness through including the epic tradition in modern media.

== Epic centers ==
The general consensus among Chinese scholars of Mongol epics is that there are three main "epic centers" within the boundaries of China, each with their own epic traditions. The first is the Bargu Epic Center, centered around the Bargu Mongols in northeastern Inner Mongolia. Bargu epics focus on the struggles of herdsmen or hunters against monsters, and are typically very short. There are no professional singers among the Bargu, and the epics are passed down through amateurs. The second is the Oirat Epic Center, centered around the Oirat Mongols and Chahar Mongols. Among the epics of this center is the Epic of Jangar. While base motifs and themes are shared with Bargu epics, the Oirat epics are typically more complicated, longer, and reflect the historical situation of the Dzungar Khanate - the epics feature views influenced by Buddhism, as well as a more modern view of the relationship between nations, their leaders, and their people. Unlike the Bargu Epic Center, the Oirat Epic Center has professional singers (called tuulchi or Jianggarchi), known for their ability to sing the Epic of Jangar. The third epic center is the Horchin Epic Center, centered around the Horchin Mongols. Horchin epics are distinct from other epics in that they typically include non-combatant protagonists (sending others to fight the antagonist/monster for them), named monsters, and a more unbalanced power dynamic between the hero and the monster. Marriage is also not common within Horchin narratives. Much like the Oirat epics, the Horchin epics also have Buddhist ideas, symbols and themes.

== Narrative structure ==
According to Walther Heissig, Mongol epics have three hundred motifs, grouped into fifteen groups. Mongol epics typically go through the unnatural birth of the hero, his marriage, and his struggle against the monster (or an antagonistic kingdom). Chao identifies two main patterns found in every Mongol epic - fighting and courtship. These can be broken up into sub-patterns - for fighting, heroes can be fighting either for revenge or possessions, while for courtship, the marriage can be either from bride-capture, competition, or arrangement by parents.

Heissig categorized epics into six main variations:

- The courting epic: The hero, in trying to acquire a bride, faces challenges on the way represented by the monster.
- The epic of recovery of lost possessions: The hero fights to regain what has been stolen by him by monsters.
- The mythicized epic: The hero fights to restore order. This includes the Epic of King Geser.
- The power-delegating epic: Multiple heroes, sent by a ruler to challenge a threat. This includes the Epic of Jangar.
- Composite ritualized epic: Epic sung to ward off a monster.

The origin of the protagonist archetype is disputed - there has been an argument that every epic hero is a version of Genghis Khan, but this has been disputed, as many Mongol epics do not include historical fact and some even shy away from naming geographical locations. The main antagonist, the monster (or Manggus), is always a multi-headed creature that steals something from the hero. The stories and interactions between these characters are black-and-white, with binary oppositions between good and bad. Chao traces this back to the traditional steppe religion of Tengriism. In addition to the protagonist and antagonist, there is the protagonist's horse - the protagonist shares a special bond with his horse, as they are often born at the same time (in cases where they are not, the birth of one prophesizes the birth of another) - and thus serves as an important companion to the protagonist. Horses also are imbued with the power of speech and the ability to predict the future. The characters and items within these epics are normally subject to extreme hyperbole.

== Performance ==
Epics are normally sung through alliterative verse in a form close to couplets. Depending on the epic center, performers use different instruments, such as the Morin khuur and Tovshuur. Oirat performers in particular sing in a special voice called khäälkh. According to traditional beliefs, the performance of epics is a powerful act that can have supernatural effects. Thus, the performance of the epic is highly respected and not respecting the performance would, according to tradition, lead to negative impacts on the surrounding environment. Traditionally, too, women have been banned from performing epics. However, in more recent years, these restrictions based on traditional belief have become more loose.

== Different genres ==
Another differing genre of Mongol oral literature is found in the hero-tale. The hero-tale, while similar to the epic, has some key differences - it is not sung, but told without a melody by amateurs. The scope, too, is much smaller, and the language used is colloquial, unlike the more antiquated language of the epics. Additionally, there are the "tales of the fiddle" or "chapbook tales" (quγur-un üliger and bengsen-ü üliger, respectively), performed using the horse-head fiddle. These tales were created in the eastern parts of the lands in which the Mongols live, such as in Inner Mongolia. Unlike the tradition-bound epics, the tales of the fiddle were for entertainment only. They drew their material from both traditional epics and foreign novels from across Asia that had been introduced to the Mongols, such as The Water Margin, Romance of the Three Kingdoms, and Thirty-Two Wooden Men.
