= Valdimar Tómasson =

Icelandic poet (born 1971)

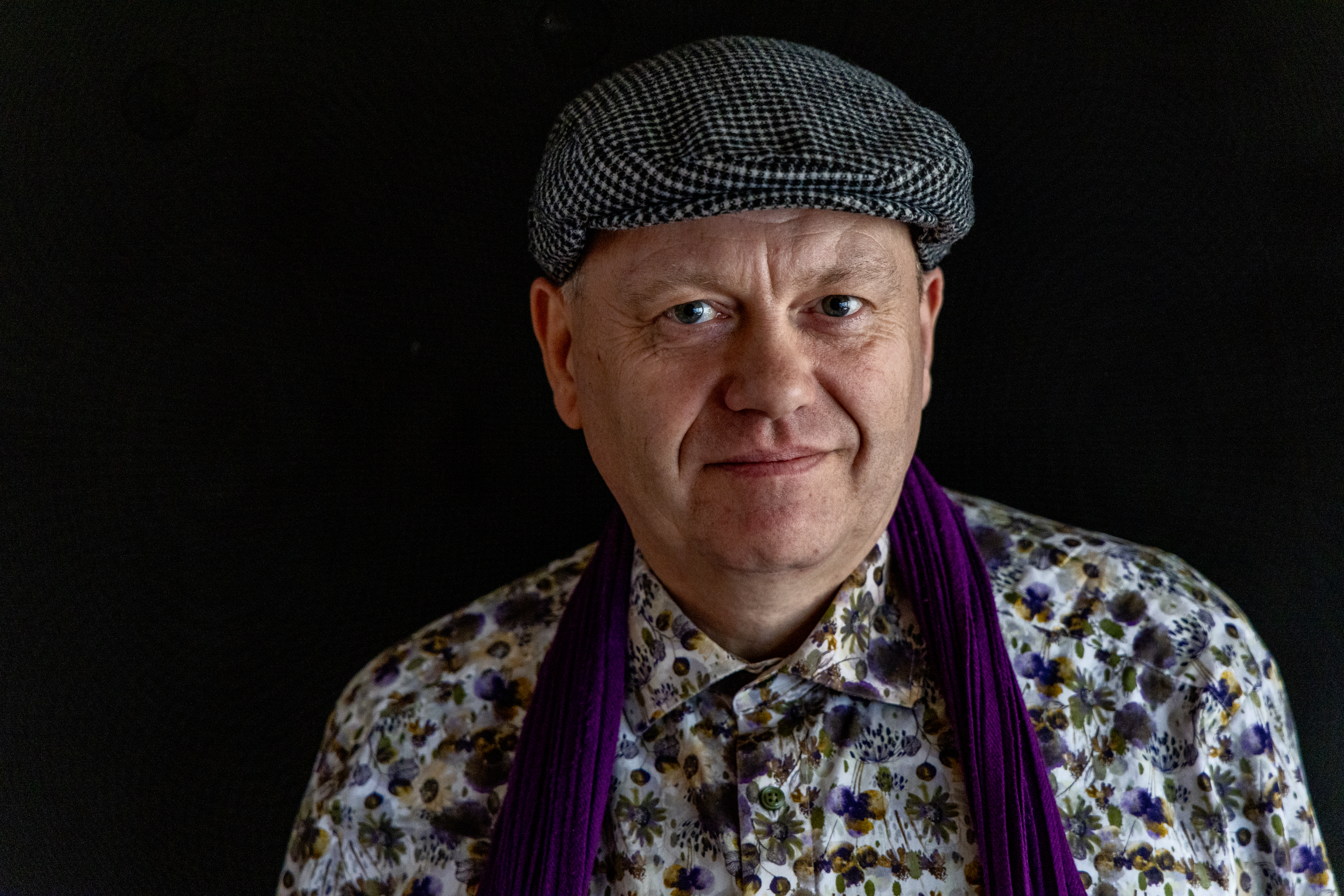
Valdimar Tómasson poet September 2024

Valdimar Tómasson (born 1971) is an Icelandic poet. He was born in Vík í Mýrdal but moved to Reykjavík at the age of 16.

Valdimar's first book, Enn sefur vatnið ("The Water Still Sleeps") was published in 2007 by the Icelandic publishing house JPV. The book contains short alliterative poems with a free rhythm. It was positively received by the newspaper Fréttablaðið and the poetry magazine Són.

Valdimar´s next work was a book of sonnets, Sonnettugeigur ("Sonnet Fear") (2013). The book sold well and made #3 on the Icelandic Publishers Association list of best-selling books of poetry for the year 2013. This commercial success led to a republishing of Enn sefur vatnið in 2014 which then made #8 on the Icelandic Publishers Association list for that year.

Valdimar returned to the format of free alliterative verse with the book Dvalið við dauðalindir ("Dwelling at the Fountains of Death") in 2017. The book was praised by the newspaper Morgunblaðið and Starafugl, a cultural magazine, and made #2 on the Icelandic Publishers Association list for 2017. Free alliterative verse is also the style of Valdimar's fourth book, Vetrarland ("Winter Land"), published in 2018. The book sold well and made #8 on the Icelandic Publishers Association list for the year.

In 2019, Valdimar's four preceding books were republished together as Ljóð 2007–2018 ("Poems 2007–2018").

In 2020, Valdimar published the book Veirufangar og veraldarharmur (Virus Capture and World Grief). It was also well received and sold well in Iceland.
