= Eelian Ovla =

Eelian Ovla (1857-1920) was a Kalmyk bard. His 1908 performances concerning the epic hero Jangar were published by Nomto Ochirov in 1910.

His nephew, Okon Sharaev, was also a jangarchi, who taught another jangarachi Teltia Lidzhiev.

A monument to EO was Druzbha Park in Elista was erected in 1990. It was included in the register of cultural heritage sites (no. 343) of the Republic of Kalmykia.

An English translation by Saglar Bougdaeva was published in 2022.

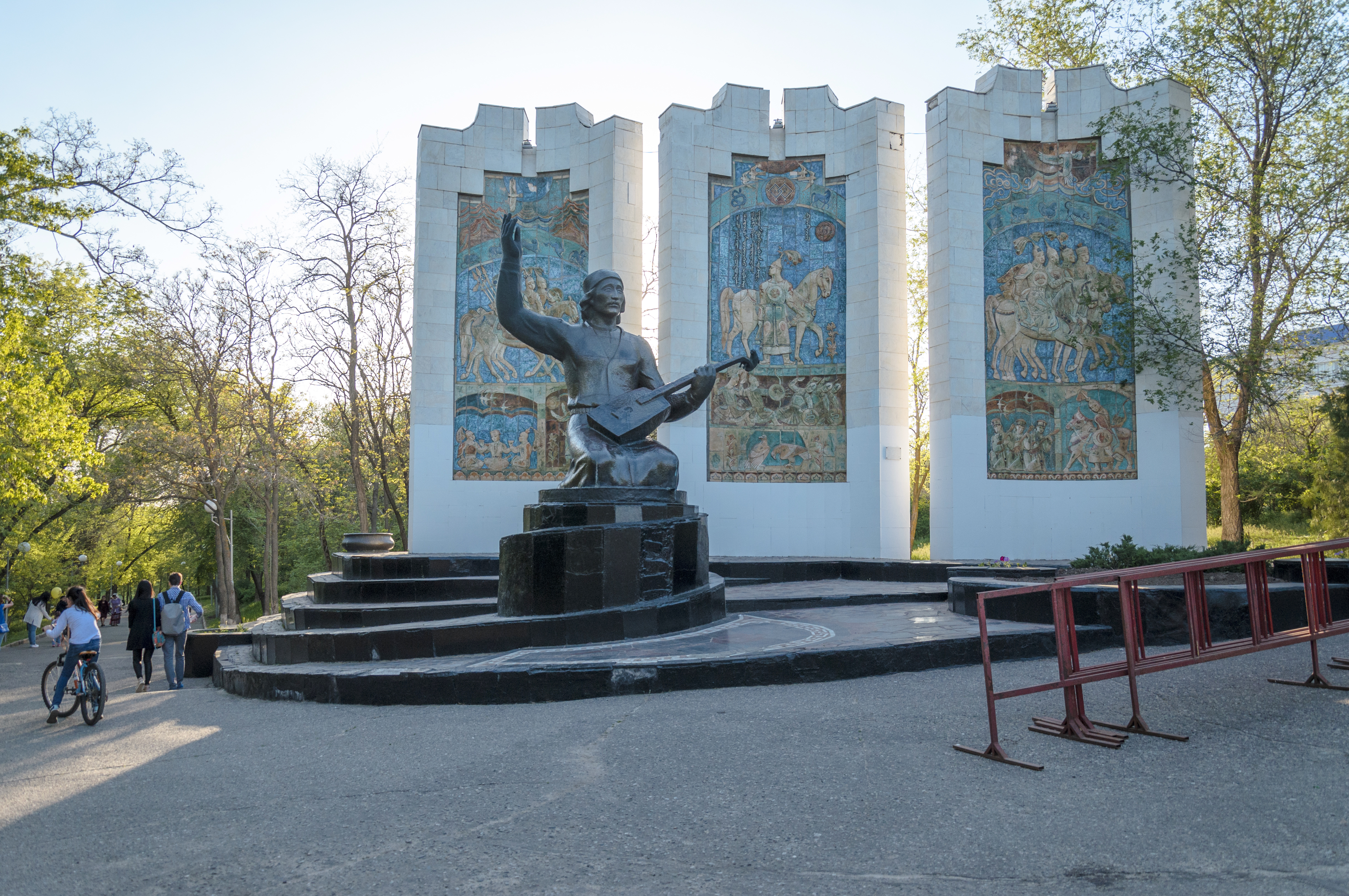
Monument to the Jangarchi (Jangar performer) Eelian Ovla in Elista
