= List of Tolkien's alliterative verse =

J. R. R. Tolkien (1892–1973), a scholar of Old English, Middle English, and Old Norse, used alliterative verse extensively in both translations and his own poetry. Most of his alliterative verse is in modern English, in a variety of styles, but he also composed some in Old English.

== Middle-earth mythos ==
=== The Lord of the Rings ===
There are numerous short alliterative verses in The Lord of the Rings (1954–1955).

Most are attributed to the Rohirrim, a nation whose language and nomenclature are modeled on Old English, though all the verses are in Modern English.

- At Théoden's Death (3 lines)
- Burial Song of Théoden (5 lines)
- Call-to-Arms of the Rohirrim (3 lines)
- Éomer's Song (4 lines)
- Lament for Théoden (21 lines)
- Song of the Mounds of Mundburg (27 lines)
- Théoden's Battle Cry (5 lines)

The remaining verses are:

- The Long List of the Ents (17 lines), attributed to the Ents of Fangorn Forest
- Malbeth the Seer's Words (12 lines), attributed to the Dúnedain of the North

=== Legendarium ===
- The Lay of the Children of Húrin (c. 1918–1925), an unfinished poetic version of the story of Túrin, going as far as Túrin's sojourn in Nargothrond. It exists in two versions, both incomplete; the first being 2276 lines long, the second containing only 745 alliterating lines, corresponding to the first 435 lines of the first version. Short parts of the Lay were remodelled into self-standing alliterative poems, Winter Comes to Nargothrond (27 lines) and an untitled poem on the waters of Sirion (26 lines). All are published in The Lays of Beleriand (1985).
- The Flight of the Noldoli (146 lines), an unfinished poem (c. 1925?) describing Fëanor's speech urging his Elves, the Noldor, to return to Middle-earth, and another unfinished poem (37 lines) describing the aftermath of the Fall of Gondolin. Both are published in The Lays of Beleriand.
- The Nameless Land (60 lines), a poem in the metre of Pearl, first published 1927; subsequent revisions (dropping one 12-line stanza) were given the title The Song of Ælfwine on Seeing the Uprising of Earendil. Three versions are published in The Lost Road and Other Writings (1987).
- A verse version of the oath of Fëanor and his sons (16 lines), incorporated into the text of the Annals of Aman for the year 1495, published in Morgoth's Ring (1993). It differs considerably from the comparable verses in The Flight of the Noldoli.
- A poem about the Istari (16 lines) published in Unfinished Tales (1980).

== Related to other legends and histories ==
- Völsungakviða en nýja (1360 lines) and Guðrúnarkviða en nýja (668 lines). These two Modern English narrative poems of the 1930s, in the Old Norse fornyrðislag stanza, are based largely on the Völsungasaga and Atlakviða, retelling the Norse legend of Sigurd and the fall of the Niflungs. These poems are published together under the title The Legend of Sigurd and Gudrun (2009), edited by Christopher Tolkien. (Note: In a 1967 letter to W. H. Auden, Tolkien wrote, "Thank you for your wonderful effort in translating and reorganizing The Song of the Sibyl. In return, I hope to send you, if I can lay my hands on it (I hope it isn't lost), a thing I did many years ago while trying to learn the art of writing alliterative poetry: an attempt to unify the lays about the Völsungs from the Elder Edda, written in the old eight-line fornyrðislag stanza.")
- King Sheave, a poem describing the arrival of Sheave (Sceaf), a postulated Germanic culture hero, in 154 lines. It was originally an incomplete portion of a longer projected poem written in the late 1930s, but was treated as a complete poem for its insertion into Tolkien's unfinished novel The Notion Club Papers, published in Sauron Defeated (1992). Nearly identical versions appear in The Lost Road and Other Writings and in Sauron Defeated. It was loosely integrated into Tolkien's writings on Númenor, but contains no material specific to Tolkien's mythos.
- The Fall of Arthur, an unfinished poem on the betrayal of Mordred and Arthur's last battles, 954 lines, published 2013.
- The Homecoming of Beorhtnoth Beorhthelm's Son, 354 lines, an alliterative verse drama describing the aftermath of the Battle of Maldon, first published in 1953.

== In Gothic ==
- Bagme Bloma ("Flower of the Trees"), an 18-line poem in Gothic in a trochaic metre, with irregular end-rhymes and irregular alliteration in each line. It is the only poem to be printed in Gothic. It was unofficially published in the rare and soon withdrawn 1936 Songs for the Philologists; also in Tom Shippey's The Road to Middle-Earth.

== In Old English ==
- Enigmata Saxonica Nuper Inventa Duo ("Two Recently Discovered Saxon Riddles"), two riddles written in Old English, describing an egg and a candle respectively. The first (of 10 lines) is written in normal alliterative metre, while the second (6 lines) includes internal rhyme in each line. First published in a poetry collection called A Northern Venture (1923).
- An unfinished Old English poem based on the Atlakviða (68 lines in two separate sections), published in The Legend of Sigurd and Gudrún.
- Four lines in Old English describing the repulse of the dragon Glómund (later renamed Glaurung) by the Elf-king Fingon, appearing in The Shaping of Middle-earth (1986).
- Five lines in Old English attributed to the mariner Ælfwine, the fictional translator of various Elvish works. These appear in the story of The Lost Road, attached to a poem called The Song of Ælfwine, and as part of a preamble to the text called Quenta Silmarillion, all published in The Lost Road and Other Writings; and again in The Notion Club Papers.
- Seven lines in Old English that are part of an Anglo-Saxon episode written for the story of The Lost Road; these are an alteration and expansion of lines 36–38 and 44–46 of the Old English poem The Seafarer. A revision, together with a Modern English translation in 7 verse lines, appears in The Notion Club Papers.
- Six Old English lines translating the first four lines of King Sheave, appearing in The Notion Club Papers.
- Four lines of Old English heroic verse, celebrating King Edward the Elder's victory over a Viking army at Archenfield; these are a parody of lines 1-4 of The Battle of Brunanburh. They appear in The Notion Club Papers.
- A verse translation of Jabberwocky entitled "Bealuwérig" of 28 lines.

== Translations ==
- A verse translation of Sir Gawain and the Green Knight in 2532 lines, of which 2027 are alliterative.
- A verse translation of Pearl in 1212 lines of rhymed verse. Both were published posthumously in 1975.
- A verse translation of some nine lines from the Old English Battle of Brunanburh, forming part of an essay on "Anglo-Saxon verse" and published together with The Fall of Arthur.
- Remaining unpublished is an incomplete verse translation of Beowulf of about 600 lines.

== Sources ==
- Shippey, Tom (1992) [1982]. The Road to Middle-Earth. London: Grafton.
