= The Tua Mariit Wemen and the Wedo =

Scots poem by William Dunbar

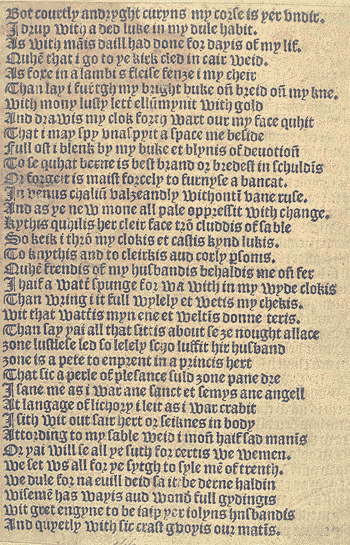
Part of The Tretis Of The Twa Mariit Wemen and the Wedo from the Chepman and Myllar Prints in the National Library of Scotland.

The Tua Mariit Wemen and the Wedo or The Tretis Of The Twa Mariit Wemen and the Wedo ('The conversation of the two married women and the widow') is a narrative poem in Scots by the makar William Dunbar.

== History ==
The poem dates to the late fifteenth or early sixteenth centuries and is written in the archaic form of alliterative verse rather than the rhyming verse more typical of Scots poetry of the time.

It survives in The Chepman and Myllar Prints of 1508, held in the National Library of Scotland and, as a fragment, in the Maitland Manuscripts, held in the Pepys Library. It is also now available online archive of medieval texts in an annotated version (see External Links below).

The poem describes an unnamed narrator's overhearing of a discussion between three women in a garden. The women speak frankly and at length of marriage and their experiences with their husbands. The discussion of sexuality is often in language which is earthy and uninhibited. The work ends with the narrator asking the reader,

Quhilk wald ye waill to your wif, gif ye suld wed one?

or, in English,

Which would you choose for your wife, if you were to marry one?

== Synopsis ==
=== The Introduction ===
The narrator is walking alone in the country on a Midsummer night admiring the beauty of nature,

Apon the Midsummer evin, mirriest of nichtis,
I muvit furth allane in meid as midnicht wes past,
Besyd ane gudlie grein garth, full of gay flouris,
Hegeit of ane huge hicht with hawthorne treis,
Quhairon ane bird on ane bransche so birst out hir notis,
That never ane blythfullar bird was on the beuche hard.

In a hedged garden he notices three women,

I saw thre gay ladeis sit in ane grein arbeir,
All grathit into garlandis of fresche gudlie flouris.
So glitterit as the gold wer thair glorius gilt tressis,
Quhill all the gressis did gleme of the glaid hewis,
Kemmit war thair cleir hair and curiouslie sched,
Attour thair schulderis doun schyre schyning full bricht,
With curches cassin thair abone of kirsp cleir and thin.

He eavesdrops on their conversation, hoping for amusement. One of the women, a widow, asks her two younger, married companions about their opinion of marriage,

"Bewrie," said the wedo, "ye woddit wemen ying,
Quhat mirth ye fand in maryage sen ye war menis wyffis.

=== The First Wife's speech ===
The first wife responds by telling the others about her unhappy marriage to an older, unattractive man.

I have ane wallidrag, ane worme, ane auld wobat carle,
A waistit wolroun, na worth bot wourdis to clatter,
Ane bumbart, ane dron bee, and bag full of flewme,
Ane skabbit skarth, ane scorpioun, ane scutarde behind,
To see him scart his awin skyn grit scunner I think,
Quhen kissis me that carybald, than kyndillis all my sorow.

She adds that while he is a poor lover, he is also wealthy and generous.

And thoght his pené purly me payis in bed,
His purse pays richely in recompense efter,
For, or he clym on my corse, that carybald forlane,
I have conditioun of a curche of kersp allther fynest,
A goun of engranyt claith, right gaily furrit,
A ring with a ryall stane, or other riche jowell.

=== The Second Wife's speech ===
The second wife speaks next and tells the others that her husband is young but also lacking as a lover due to a lecherous past.

He is a young man ryght yaip, bot nought in youthis flouris,
For he is fadit full far and feblit of strenth.
He wes as flurising fresche within this few yeris,
Bot he is falyeid full far and fulyeid in labour,
He has bene lychour so lang quhill lost is his natur,
His lume is waxit larbar and lyis into swonne.

He is vain and boasting.

He has a luke without lust and lif without curage,
He has a borme without force and fessous but vertu,
And fair wordis but effect, all fruster of dedis.

She adds that she would like a new lover,

Ye speik of berdis on bewch, of blise may thai sing,
That, on Sanct Valentynis day, ar vacandis ilk yer,
Hed I that plesand prevelege to part quhen me likit,
To change, and ay to cheise agane, than, chastité, adew!,
Than suld I haif a fresch feir to fang in myn armes,
To hald a freke, quhill he faynt, may foly be calit.

=== The Widow's Speech ===
The widow speaks next. She begins by advising her friends to emulate her behaviour of adopting a gentle persona while remaining secretly ruthless.

I schaw yow, sisteris in schrift, I wes a schrew evir,
Bot I wes schene in my schrowd, and schew me innocent,
And thought I dour wes and dane, dispitous, and bald,
I wes dissymblit suttelly in a sanctis liknes,
I semyt sober, and sueit, and sempill without fraud,
Bot I couth sexty dissaif that suttilar wer haldin.

She summarises this approach as,

Be dragonis baith and dowis, ay in double forme,
And quhen it nedis yow, onone, note baith ther strenthis,
Be amyable with humble face, as angellis apperand,
And with a terrebill tail be stangand as edderis.

==== Her First Husband ====
She reveals that she has been married twice. Her first husband, like that of the first wife, was an older man.

ane hair hogeart, that hostit out flewme,
I hatit him like a hund, thought I it hid prevé.

She meanwhile had a younger lover,

I had a lufsummar leid my lust for to slokyn,
That couth be secrete and sure and ay saif my honour,
And sew bot at certayne tymes and in sicir placis,
Ay quhen the ald did me anger with akword wordis
Apon the galland for to goif it gladit me agane.

She gave birth to a son, but confides that her husband was impotent by the time of his conception. She persuaded him to bequeath his property to the boy.

I wald him chuk, cheik and chyn, and cheris him so mekill,
That his chief chymys he had chevist to my sone,
Suppos the churll wes gane chaist or the child wes gottin.

==== Her Second Husband ====
Her second marriage was to a wealthy merchant, whom she considered to be socially inferior.

He maid me ryght hie reverens, fra he my rycht knew,
For, thocht I say it myself, the severance wes mekle
Betuix his bastard blude and my birth noble.

She intimidated the man with constant reminders of his supposedly low birth.

I held ay grene into his mynd that I of grace tuk him,
And for he couth ken himself I curtasly him lerit,
He durst not sit anys my summondis, for or the secund charge,
He wes ay redy for to ryn, so rad he wes for blame.

He is persuaded by her intimidation to will his property to her son.

Yit tuk I nevir the wosp clene out of my wyde throte,
Quhil I oucht wantit of my will or quhat I wald desir.
Bot quhen I severit had that syre of substance in erd,
And gottin his biggingis to my barne, and hie burrow landis,
Than with a stew stert out the stoppell of my hals,
That he all stunyst throu the stound, as of a stele wappin.

She continued to dominate her husband, whom she refers to as 'wife',

I maid that wif carll to werk all womenis werkis,
And laid all manly materis and mensk in this eird.
Than said I to my cumaris in counsall about,
Se how I cabeld yone cout with a kene brydill!

She obtained valuable possessions from him,

He grathit me in a gay silk and gudly arrayis,
In gownis of engranyt claith and gret goldin chenyeis,
In ringis ryally set with riche ruby stonis,

She then promoted her own children while denigrating her husband's children.

I buskit up my barnis like baronis sonnis,
And maid bot fulis of the fry of his first wif.

She didn't mourn his death.

Deid is now that dyvour and dollin in erd,
With him deit all my dule and my drery thoghtis,
Now done is my dolly nyght, my day is upsprungin,
Adew dolour, adew! my daynté now begynis,
Now am I a wedow, iwise, and weill am at ese.

==== Her Widowhood ====
Once widowed, she adopted traditional mourning customs, insincerely.

My mouth it makis murnyng, and my mynd lauchis,
My clokis thai ar caerfull in colour of sabill,
Bot courtly and ryght curyus my corse is ther undir.

She took a secret lover.

I have ane secrete servand, rycht sobir of his toung,
That me supportis of sic nedis, quhen I a syne mak,
Thoght he be sympill to the sicht; he has a tong sickir.
Full mony semelyar sege wer service dois mak,
Thought I haif cair, under cloke, the cleir day quhill nyght,
Yit I have solace, under serk, quhill the sone ryse.

She receives suitors, but does not take them seriously.

To every man in speciall I speik sum wordis,
So wisly and so womanly, quhill warmys ther hertis.
Thar is no liffand leid so law of degré,
That sall me luf unluffit, I am so loik hertit.
And gif his lust be so lent into my lyre quhit,
That he be lost or with me lig, his lif sall nocht danger.
I am so mercifull in mynd and menys all wichtis,
My sely saull sal be saif, quhen sabot all jugis.

The widow ends her speech by encouraging her younger friends to learn from her experience.

Ladyis leir thir lessonis and be no lassis fundin,
This is the legeand of my lif, thought Latyne it be nane.

=== The Conclusion ===
The discussion ends with the married women acclaiming the widow as a good example for them:

Quhen endit had her ornat speche, this eloquent wedow,
Lowd thai lewch all the laif, and loffit hir mekle,
And said thai suld exampill tak of her soverane teching,
And wirk efter hir wordis, that woman wes so prudent.

The narrator departs for his home and ends the poem with the question,

Of thir thre wantoun wiffis, that I haif writtin heir,
Quhilk wald ye waill to your wif, gif ye suld wed one?
