= Trochaic tetrameter =

Poetic line of four trochaic feet

In English poetry, trochaic tetrameter is a meter featuring lines composed of four trochaic feet. The etymology of trochaic derives from the Greek trokhaios, from the verb trecho, meaning I run. In modern English poetry, a trochee is a foot consisting of a stressed syllable followed by an unstressed syllable. Thus a tetrameter contains four trochees or eight syllables.

In classical metre, the word tetrameter means a line with four metra, wherein each metron contains two trochees. Thus a classical trochaic tetrameter contains 16 syllables (15 syllables if catalectic).

== Example ==
The rhythm of a line of an English trochaic tetrameter is:

1st foot		2nd foot		3rd foot		4th foot	
DUM	da	DUM	da	DUM	da	DUM	da

Using the symbols of classical poetry, the longum and the breve (brevis), a line of trochaic tetrameter is represented as:

1st foot		2nd foot		3rd foot		4th foot	
–	⏑	–	⏑	–	⏑	–	⏑

When the tetrameter is catalectic, the last syllable of the line is omitted.

== Literature ==
=== The Song of Hiawatha ===
An example of epic poetry written in trochaic tetrameter is The Song of Hiawatha (1855), by Henry Wadsworth Longfellow. The excerpt below is from the stanzas about “Hiawatha’s Childhood”. The bold text indicates the accented syllables of each trochee:

By the shores of Gitche Gumee,
By the shining Big-Sea-Water,
Stood the wigwam of Nokomis,
Daughter of the Moon, Nokomis.
Dark behind it rose the forest,
Rose the black and gloomy pine-trees,
Rose the firs with cones upon them;
Bright before it beat the water,
Beat the clear and sunny water,
Beat the shining Big-Sea-Water.

=== A Midsummer Night’s Dream ===
William Shakespeare employed trochaic tetrameter in A Midsummer Night's Dream (1594), in the dialogues of the fairies, which are written in catalectic trochaic tetrameter; Puck speaks:

Through the forest have I gone.
But Athenian found I none,
On whose eyes I might approve
This flower's force in stirring love.
Night and silence.—Who is here?
Weeds of Athens he doth wear:
This is he, my master said,
Despised the Athenian maid;
And here the maiden, sleeping sound,
On the dank and dirty ground.
Pretty soul! she durst not lie
Near this lack-love, this kill-courtesy.
Churl, upon thy eyes I throw
All the power this charm doth owe.
When thou wakest, let love forbid
Sleep his seat on thy eyelid:
So awake when I am gone;
For I must now to Oberon.

The conversation between Puck and Oberon is written in catalectic trochaic tetrameter:

OBERON
Flower of this purple dye,
Hit with Cupid's archery,
Sink in apple of his eye.
When his love he doth espy,
Let her shine as gloriously
As the Venus of the sky.
When thou wakest, if she be by,
Beg of her for remedy.

Re-enter PUCK

PUCK
Captain of our fairy band,
Helena is here at hand;
And the youth, mistook by me,
Pleading for a lover's fee.
Shall we their fond pageant see?
Lord, what fools these mortals be!

OBERON
Stand aside: the noise they make
Will cause Demetrius to awake.

PUCK
Then will two at once woo one;
That must needs be sport alone;
And those things do best please me
That befal preposterously.

=== King Lear ===
The character of Edgar disguised as "Poor Tom", in King Lear (1605):

EDGAR
Tom will throw his head at them: avaunt, you curs!
Be thy mouth or black or white,
Tooth that poisons if it bite;
Mastiff greyhound, mongrel grim,
Hound or spaniel, brach or him,
Or bobtail tyke or trundle-tail,
Tom will make him weep and wail;
For with throwing thus my head,
Dogs leap the hatch and all are fled.

=== Macbeth ===
The Three Witches in Macbeth (1606):

FIRST WITCH
When shall we three meet again
In thunder, lightning, or in rain?

SECOND WITCH
When the hurlyburly's done,
When the battle's lost and won.

THIRD WITCH
That will be ere the set of sun.

FIRST WITCH
Where the place?

SECOND WITCH
Upon the heath.

THIRD WITCH
There to meet with Macbeth.

FIRST WITCH
I come, graymalkin!

SECOND WITCH
Paddock calls.

THIRD WITCH
Anon!

ALL
Fair is foul, and foul is fair:
Hover through the fog and filthy air.

=== Latin liturgy ===
In the 13th century hymns written in medieval Latin, the Dies Irae is the poetry sequence of the Roman Catholic requiem mass; the first two verses are:

Dies iræ! dies illa
Solvet sæclum in favilla
Teste David cum Sibylla!

Quantus tremor est futurus,
quando judex est venturus,
cuncta stricte discussurus!

In the Stabat Mater meditation on the suffering of Mary, during Jesus' crucifixion, the first two verses are:

Stabat mater dolorosa
iuxta Crucem lacrimosa,
dum pendebat Filius.

Cuius animam gementem,
contristatam et dolentem
pertransivit gladius.

== Kalevala meter ==
Balto-Finnic (e.g. Estonian, Finnish, Karelian) folk poetry uses a form of trochaic tetrameter that has been called the Kalevala meter. The Finnish and Estonian national epics, Kalevala and Kalevipoeg, are both written in this meter, which like Germanic alliterative verse makes heavy use of alliteration within the poetic line. The meter is thought to have originated during the Proto-Finnic period. Its main rules are as follows (examples are taken from the Kalevala):

Syllables fall into three types: strong, weak, and neutral. A long syllable (one that contains a long vowel or a diphthong, or ends in a consonant) with a main stress is metrically strong, and a short syllable with a main stress is metrically weak. All syllables without a main stress are metrically neutral. A strong syllable can only occur in the rising part of the second, third, and fourth foot of a line:

Veli / kulta, / veikko/seni (1:11)
("Brother dear, little brother")

A weak syllable can only occur in the falling part of these feet:

Miele/ni mi/nun te/kevi (1:1)
("I have a mind to ...")

Neutral syllables can occur at any position. The first foot has a freer structure, allowing strong syllables in a falling position and weak syllables in a rising position:

Niit' en/nen i/soni / lauloi (1:37)
("My father used to sing them")
vesois/ta ve/tele/miä (1:56)
("tugged from the saplings")

It is also possible for the first foot to contain three or even four syllables.

There are two main types of line: a normal trochaic tetrameter and a broken trochaic tetrameter. In a normal tetrameter, word-stresses and foot-stresses match, and there is a caesura between the second and third feet:

Veli / kulta, // veikko/seni

A broken tetrameter (Finnish murrelmasäe) has at least one stressed syllable in a falling position. There is usually no caesura:

Miele/ni mi/nun te/kevi

Traditional poetry in the Kalevala meter uses both types with approximately the same frequency. The alteration of normal and broken tetrameters is a characteristic difference between the Kalevala meter and other forms of trochaic tetrameter.
