= Epic of Jangar =

Traditional oral epic poem (tuuli) of the Mongols

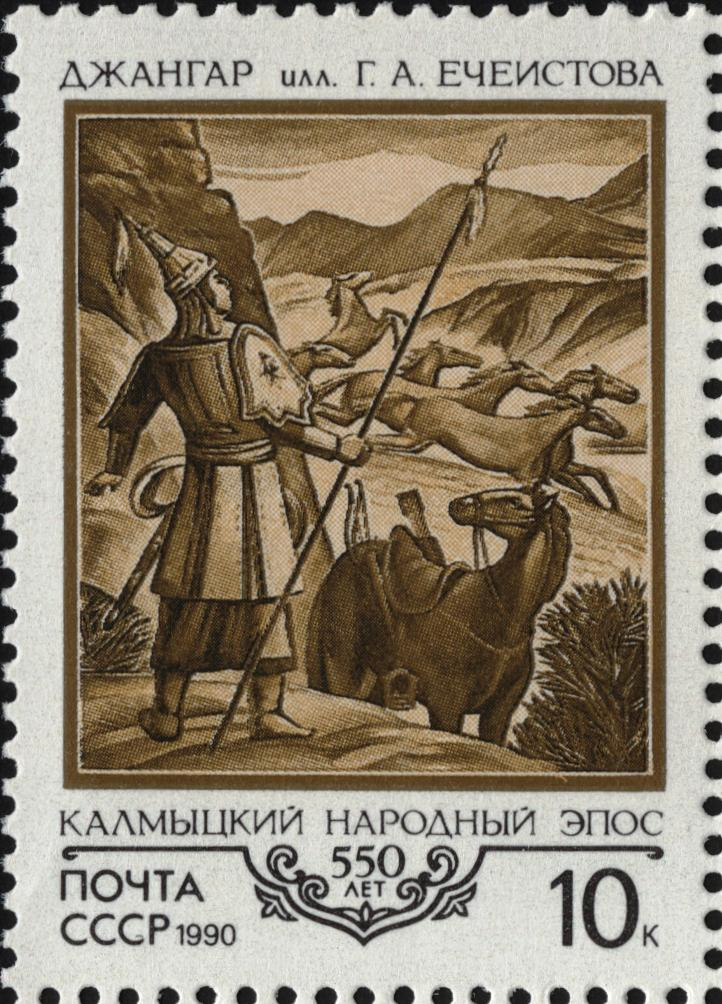
The illustration for Jangar by Georgi Yecheistov. 1940. Postage stamp of the USSR. 1990.

The epic of Jangar or Jangar epic (Kalmyk: Җаңһр, romanized: Cañhr, [d͡ʒaŋɣər]; Mongolian: ᠵᠢᠩᠭᠠᠷ, Жангар, romanized: Jangar, [d͡ʒɑŋɢər]) is a traditional oral epic poem (tuuli) of the Mongols. It was long thought to be particular to the Kalmyks, but is now known to also be widely told among the Oirats in Mongolia, China and Russia. The story is recited by singers called Jangarchi (Kalmyk: Җаңһрч, romanized: Cañhrç, [d͡ʒaŋɣərt͡ʃə]). The Jangar has approximately 25 or 26 chapters, though certain versions may have more than 100 chapters.

== Synopsis ==
=== Chapter 1: Jangar's Ancestors and Birth ===
The epic begins by recounting the story of Jangar's great-grandfather, Tahil Zul Khan, who is kind and honest. Tahil Zul Khan leads his people to a land called Bomba where he hoped to create a place where they would be no suffering or death. His tribe settles in Bomba and after 10 years of struggle, they manage to build a paradise there. However, one day Tahil Zul Khan goes to check on his horse herd and a blizzard strikes, forcing him to take refuge in a valley. When the blizzard finally waned after several days, he tried to leave, only to be buried by an avalanche.

Tangsag Bumva, his son, becomes Khan. Also noted for being kind and wise, he tries to do what his father has done, but is thwarted by years of bad weather that kills half the tribe's livestock. Eventually Tangsag Bumva Khan dies of overwork, and his 12-year-old son Ujung Aldar becomes Khan. Ujung Aldar is Jangar's father.

==== Jangar's Father ====
One day Ujung Aldar was participating in a horse race with some other youths for the prize of an iron-gray horse. However, as he rode past a hill, he came to a lake and stopped to watch a pair of swans courting. Fascinated by their love, he watched them until they flew away. Afterwards, he found himself feeling lonely and sad. His advisor, Master Choirom, suggested that he take a wife, and mentioned a 16-year-old girl named Urmaa in the tribe of Dorj Khan in the south. Ujung Aldar was pleased at the prospect, so Choirom went to Dorj Khan to arrange the match. Dorj Khan was agreeable, so Ujung Aldar Khan went to the south to be married, bring with him betrothal gifts. After drinking 75 cups of liquor and 75 cups of fermented milk with Dorj Khan, Ujung Aldar Khan left the party and went to the tent where his bride Urmaa was. In accordance with custom, the other members of Urmaa's family playfully tried to stop him, and he had to force, argue, and persuade his way through to the bride's yurt. At last he managed to break through and go in and get his wife. He put her on his great red stallion, Aranjagaan, and they galloped to the bridal yurt. Afterwards they returned to Bomba together.

Two years later, it became apparent that the couple could not produce a child. They tried various kinds of medicine, but nothing worked. At last, Master Choirom suggested that they talk to a herdsman who had 19 children. They called the herdsman in and he explained his secret: when the horses began to rut, he and his wife would watch them mate, then go mate themselves. Promising to reward the herder if the trick worked, Ujung Aldar Khan agreed to try it.

The couple secretly stole out to the steppe and hid behind a large rock so that they could watch a stallion and mare mate. Afterwards, they returned to their palace and tried for a child. The trick worked, and several months later it became apparent that Urmaa was pregnant. Ujung Aldar Khan sent the herdsman 100 cows as a reward. Urmaa was pregnant for 10 months, but could not give birth. When she finally did give birth, it was to a strange red mass. Ujung Aldar ordered a servant to throw it out, but then a voice cried from within, "I'm suffocating! Let me out of here!" They tried to cut the red mass open with a sword, but the sword merely chipped. Master Choirom came and recommended that they use Sword given by the Jade Emperor, and with this sword they were able to cut the red mass and free the large baby boy within. The baby's skin had auspicious markings: a red mole and a birthmark on his buttocks. The child was strong and kicked his leather swaddling cloths to pieces, making Urmaa afraid that her son was ill-fated to cause destruction. She begged Ujung Aldar to let the child die, but he appreciated his son's strength and refused. The tribe celebrated the baby's birth together.

==== The invasion of Bumba ====
Ujung Aldar became so preoccupied with his new son that he began to neglect the affairs of the tribe, particularly the defenses. A Manggus, or devil, called Goljing had long been an enemy of Bomba. Seeing Ujung Aldar's weakness, he attacked with 10,000 warriors on black horses and easily captured Bomba. Ujung Aldar Khan and his wife and son were besieged in their palace. Seeking to save his son's life, Ujung Aldar put a piece of white jade in his son's mouth, placed him on the horse Aranjagaan, and sent his servant Menhbayar to take the child to safety. He also gave the servant the Aram spear, a weapon that had been passed down for generations. Then Ujang Aldar fought the invaders until he and his wife were cut down.

The servant took the child to Big Black Mountain and hid him in a cave, then walked back to the palace to see what had happened. Discovering everything destroyed and the Khan dead, he decided to take his revenge by attacking some of the invaders as they sat around a fire. He killed one of them, but was soon killed himself. In the mountain cave, the boy sucked the white jade to keep himself from growing hungry or thirsty for a few days. But eventually he began to cry. A man named Mengen Xigxirge was hunting nearby, and he noticed the horse Aranjagaan grazing. Wanting to see what the horse was doing there, he went closer, and heard the baby crying. He followed the noise and discovered the cave. At first Mengen Xigxirge wanted to adopt the boy, so he decided to give him the name "Jangar." The boy immediately agreed that this should be his name and declared that he would become master of the world. This frightened Mengen Xigxirge, who was worried that Jangar might dispossess his own son, Hongor. So he decided to leave Jangar there with some food and water and left.

==== Jangar in the wild ====
Jangar went outside and roared, and all the animals living nearby came to see what the noise was. He befriended them and they fed him and taught him their skills. She-wolves suckled him, and deer brought him fruit. He learned to roar from a tiger, to hunt from an eagle, and to run from an antelope. Jangar lived in the wild for two years, soon attaining the age of three.

One day an old man appeared while Jangar was sitting under a tree. The man told him about what had happened to his parents and trained him in martial arts and magic. But no sooner had Jangar learned these things than he woke up—it was morning, and it had all been a dream. Nonetheless, he felt strong, and discovered that he could uproot a tree and smash a camel-sized rock with it. He mounted Aranjagaan and went home to kill Goljing.

==== Jangar kills his first enemies ====
Three-year-old Jangar fought his way to Goljing's palace, destroying three strongholds on the way, and thrust his spear into the Manggus' chest, killing him. Then Jangar climbed up on the roof of the palace and called back all the people who had fled after the invasion. He became Khan and Bomba flourished again.

Meanwhile, another ruler named Shar Durdeng began raiding the outskirts of Bomba for livestock, women and children. Jangar was upset, and the three-year-old Khan took up his spear and rode alone to face his new enemy. To reach Shar Durdeng's palace, Jangar had to fight for seven months and 19 days. He overthrew four strongholds, and finally reached the crystal palace by the sea where his enemy dwelt. He snuck inside and found everyone drunk. Taking hold of the intoxicated Shar Durdeng, Jangar threw him off his throne, and proceeded to break ribs and spinal bones until Shar Durdeng agreed to leave Bomba in peace and pay taxes and tribute.

The first chapter of the Epic of Jangar ends by noting that by the age of five, Jangar had defeated five Mangguses and quintupled the size of the Bomba's territory.

=== Chapter 2: Jangar and Mengen Xigxirge ===
Besides being a hunter, Mengen Xigxirge was also a wrestler. He had once successfully wrestled and pinned a bull. Hearing of Jangar's success, Mengen Xigxirge was sorry that he left the boy alone on the mountain unharmed. He invited Jangar to come wrestle with him, and Jangar agreed. They shared a meal of mare's milk and lamb, then began to wrestle. The match lasted for several days, but finally Mengen Xigxirge prevailed. Having Jangar at his mercy, he determined to kill him and summoned men with swords. But Mengen Xigxirge's son Hongor grabbed hold of Jangar and pleaded his father not to harm him. Mengen Xigxirge tried to drive his son off, but was unable to do so; finally he succumbed and agreed to save Jangar on one condition: that he fight Altan Gheej, a man who could see 99 years into the future and 99 years into the past. Altan Gheej had fought Jangar's father long ago and almost destroyed him. Mengen Xigxirge hoped that the contest would prove to be Jangar's undoing.

Jangar, riding Aranjagaan and carrying the Aram spear, went to attack Altan Gheej. Riding for three months, he finally arrived at the mountain where Altan Gheej's palace was located. Nearby was a herd of 80,000 iron-grey horses. Jangar reasoned that if Altan Gheej knew the future, then he must know that Jangar had come to attack him on that day. So instead of attacking, he decided to drive away the horses instead. Altan Gheej, however, had known that Jangar would drive off his horses and that the horses would eventually return, so he stayed at his palace instead of pursuing. It wasn't until Jangar was about to leave his territory a month later that he finally pursued. As Jangar was crossing a river, Altan Gheej took aim with his bow and fired a poison arrow at Jangar. The missile struck and Jangar felt dizzy. He put the piece of jade in his mouth. Aranjagaan, realizing what had happened, took Jangar to safety. Altan Gheej collected his horses and drove them back home.

== Commemoration ==
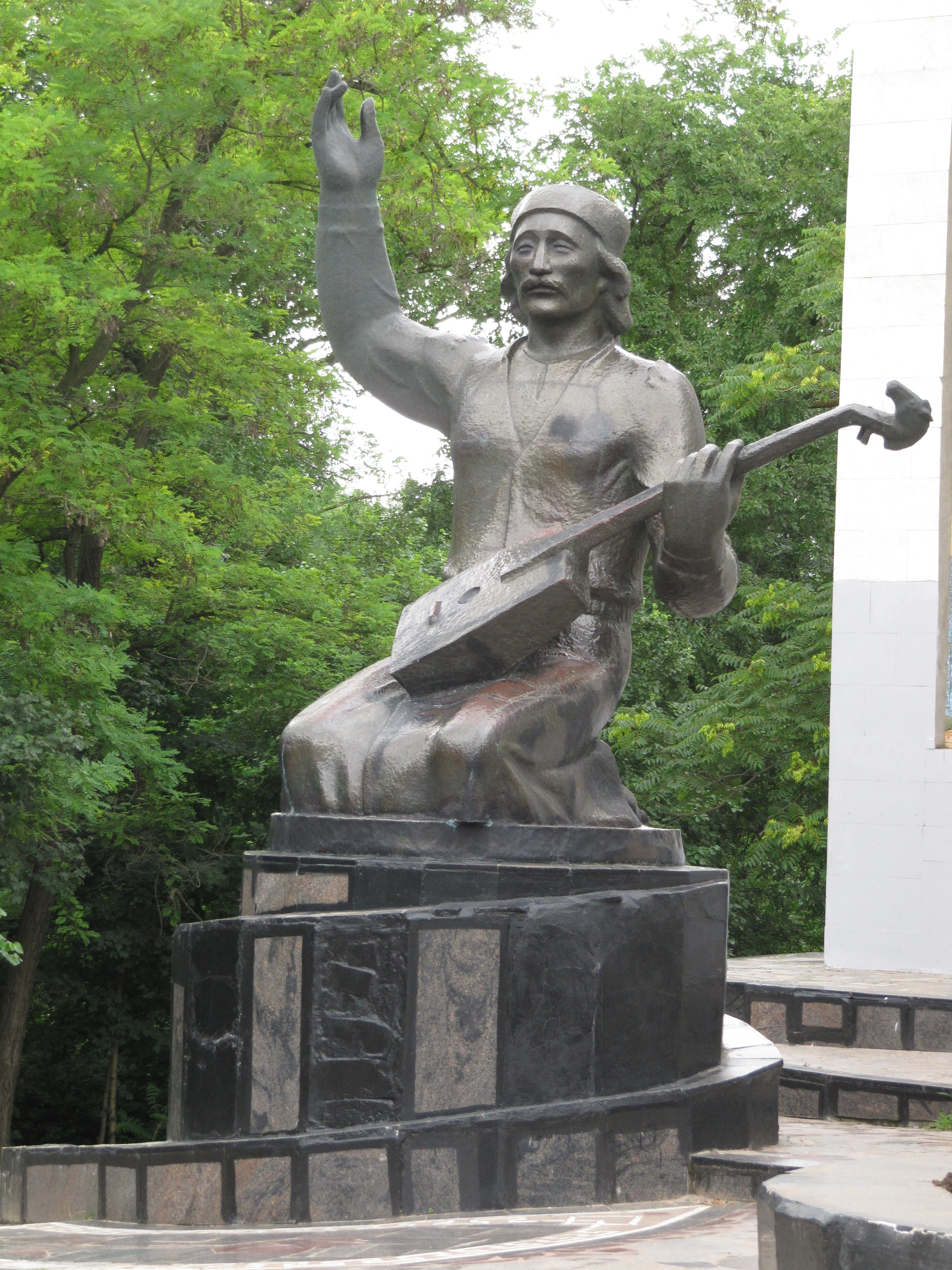
Monument to the Jangarchi (Jangar performer) Eelian Ovla in Elista

In 2014, the Jangar Culture and Art Palace (江格尔文化艺术宫) was opened in the Hoboksar Mongol Autonomous County, in Xinjiang (China), which is traditionally considered the place of origin of the epic.

In 2016, a Chinese computer-animated film titled Hero Jianger (Chinese: 英雄江格尔) was released exclusively on the streaming platform iQIYI.
