= Tournament of Tottenham =

The Tournament of Tottenham is a short humorous poem of 231 lines written in Middle English and is dated between 1400 and 1440. There are three known manuscripts for the poem: Harley 5396 (H), 1456 in the British Library, Ff. V. 48 (C), 1431 in the Cambridge University Library, and English 590 (E) in Harvard University's Houghton Library. The dialect has been identified as Northern English. The line is alliterative, either emulating or parodying older Germanic metrical styles. The author is unknown.

== Plot ==
The story is set in Tottenham, at that time a rural community north of London.

During a drinking fest, Perkyn (a potter) boasts to Rondal, the local reeve, that he is the most worthy among the men to marry Tyb, Rondal's attractive daughter. The boast brings about responses from the others, who equally boast of their worthiness, whereupon Perkyn challenges anyone to a joust to settle the issue. Rondal elects to settle the matter by agreeing with Perkyn's idea of a joust, and schedules a jousting tournament to be held seven days later, open to any and all potential suitors. The winner of the tournament will be granted Tyb's hand in marriage (subject to her assent) as well as a "dowry" (the first of several humorous elements of the joust; it consists of one old gray mare and one spotted sow).

At the tournament, the suitors arrive riding old mares as horses, brandishing farm implements for jousting lances, and wearing bowls and pottery as armour. Tyb arrives at the tournament and watches the proceedings on a mare, with a feather-filled bag for a saddle and a hen on her lap. After each worker makes his overblown boast of bravery (Perkyn going last), the "tournament" commences.

Notwithstanding the lack of professional jousting attire, the participants engage in a lively battle which results in several serious injuries and one attempt (by "Tyrry") to prematurely end the battle by abducting Tyb (his attempt is stopped by Perkyn). At the end of the tournament, the women of Tottenham and the nearby communities arrive to drag them home. Perkyn ends up being the last combatant standing and is thus declared the winner and given Tyb. After they spend the night together, she agrees the next day to marry him.

Upon the announcement of the marriage, the warriors gather for a feast. (The feast is described in more detail in another shorter poem, "The Feast of Tottenham", the author of which is unknown, but it is believed that both poems were written by the same person.)

== Criticism ==
The poem is evidently meant to be humorous, as the weapons are totally unsuited to war; the combatants fight with farm tools on old horses more given to passing wind than battle. The martial seriousness of the men's vows is immediately undermined by comic touches such as the banners made from old hides and a trumpet made of wood, fighting for a dowry of an old horse and a spotted pig. The poem does not explain why some of the warriors are fighting for Tyb's hand in marriage when they currently have wives (who arrive to drag home their injured men in wheelbarrows).

Critics do not agree on the subject of or audience for the parody. The poem may be satirizing knightly conventions such as the jousting tournament, or it may be mocking the country bumpkins who try to imitate these courtly rituals. Or, as with Chaucer's Reeve's Tale, the poet may be making fun of speakers of northern English, who were often stereotyped by southerners as backward.
