= Middle-earth in video games =

Video games inspired by J. R. R. Tolkien's Middle-earth

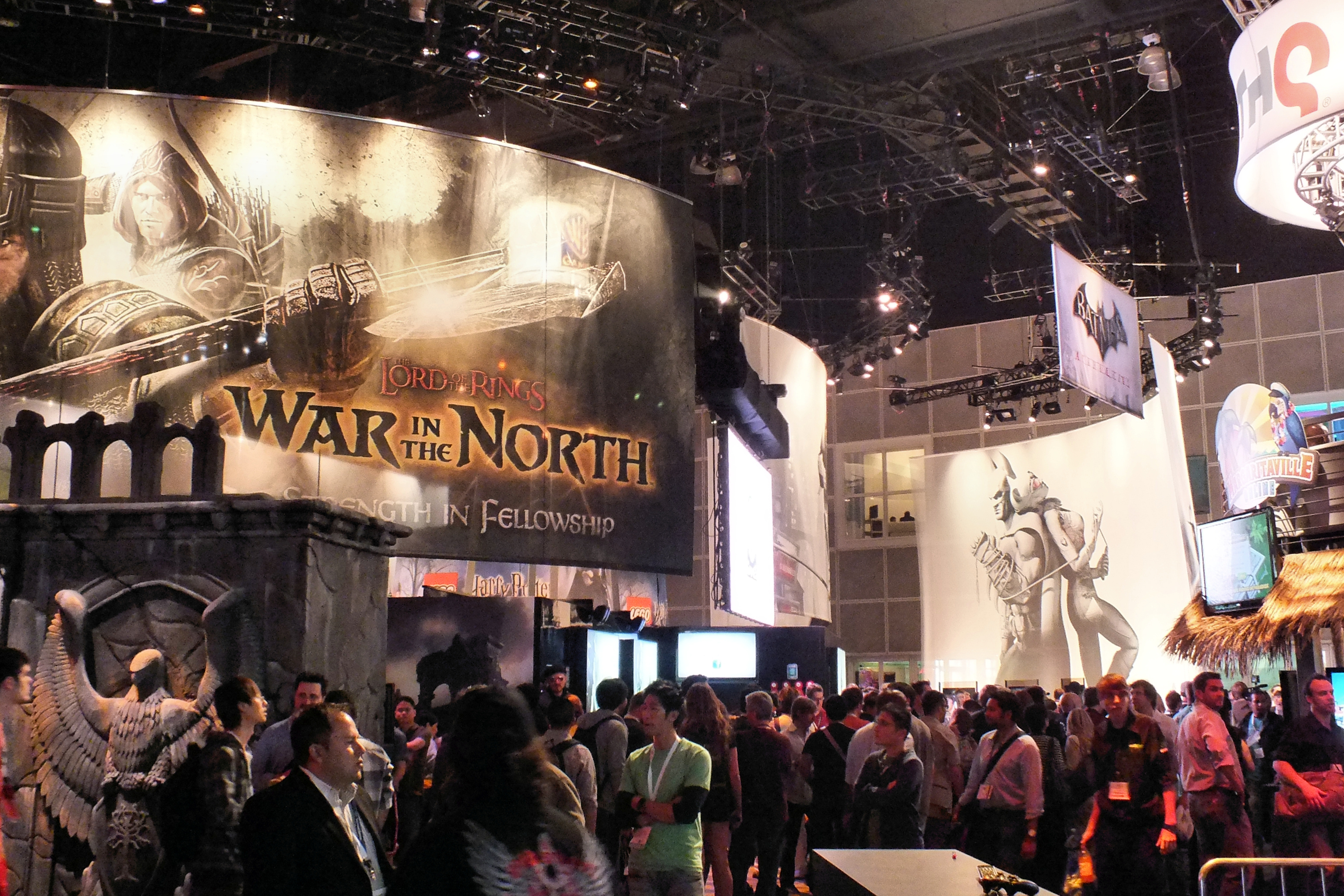
Middle-earth video games, including the action role-playing hack and slash game The Lord of the Rings: War in the North, on display at the Electronic Entertainment Expo 2011

There are many video games that have been inspired by J. R. R. Tolkien's works set in Middle-earth. Titles have been produced by studios such as Electronic Arts, Vivendi Games, Melbourne House, and Warner Bros. Interactive Entertainment.

== Official games ==
=== Early efforts (1982–1994) ===
In 1982, Melbourne House began a series of licensed Lord of the Rings graphical interactive fiction (text adventure) games with The Hobbit, based on the book with the same name. The game was considered quite advanced at the time, with interactive characters that moved between locations independent of the player, and Melbourne House's 'Inglish' text parser which accepted full-sentence commands where the norm was simple two-word verb/noun commands. They went on to release 1986's The Fellowship of the Ring, 1987's Shadows of Mordor, and 1989's The Crack of Doom. A BBC Micro text adventure released around the same time was unrelated to Melbourne's titles except for the literary origin. In 1987, Melbourne House released War in Middle Earth, a real-time strategy game. Konami also released an action-strategy game titled J. R. R. Tolkien's Riders of Rohan.

The Lord of Rings: Journey to Rivendell was announced in 1983 by Parker Brothers for the Atari 2600, but was never released. The prototype ROM can be found at AtariAge.

In 1990, Interplay, in collaboration with Electronic Arts (who would later obtain the licences to the film trilogy), released Lord of the Rings Vol. I (a special CD-ROM version of which featured cut-scenes from Ralph Bakshi's animated adaptation) and the following year's Lord of the Rings Vol. II: The Two Towers, a series of role-playing video games based on the events of the first two books. A third instalment was planned, but never released. Interplay's games mostly appeared on the PC and Amiga, but later they did a Lord of the Rings game for the SNES, which was different from the PC Version. A Lord of the Rings game for Sega Genesis was planned to be released by Electronic Arts but never released. In 2000, Troika Games was contracted to make a Lord of the Rings game by Sierra On-Line based on the novel. In 2001, Sierra decided to develop the game internally. The game was cancelled in 2002, when Sierra shut down their development studio.

=== Film trilogy revival (2001–2009) ===
Thereafter, no official The Lord of the Rings titles were released until the making of Peter Jackson's The Lord of the Rings film trilogy for New Line Cinema in the early 2000s, which brought the story to the mass market. Electronic Arts obtained the licences for the three films, while Vivendi Games obtained the licence to produce games based on the books from Tolkien Enterprises. This gave rise to an unusual situation: Electronic Arts produced no adaptation of The Fellowship of the Ring, but produced adaptations of The Two Towers (which covered events of both the first two films) and The Return of the King, whereas Vivendi only produced a game covering the first volume of Tolkien's work, The Fellowship of the Ring. While Vivendi's access to the book rights prevented them from using material from the film, it permitted them to include elements of The Lord of the Rings which were not in the films. EA, on the other hand, were not permitted to do this, as they were only licensed to develop games based on the films, which left out elements of the original story or deviated in places.

In 2003, Vivendi produced an adaptation of The Hobbit, aimed at a younger audience: The Hobbit, as well as a real-time strategy game The Lord of the Rings: War of the Ring, both based on Tolkien's literature.

Further spin-offs from the film trilogy were produced: A real time strategy game The Lord of the Rings: The Battle for Middle-earth, and a turn-based role-playing game The Lord of the Rings: The Third Age were released in 2004, and a PSP-exclusive title, The Lord of the Rings: Tactics in 2005.

In 2005, EA secured the rights to both the films and the books, thus The Lord of the Rings: The Battle for Middle-earth II incorporated elements of the film adaptions, and the original Tolkienesque lore. EA also began work on an open world role-playing video game called The Lord of the Rings: The White Council, but it was put on indefinite hold in early 2007, with no further information about its developmental or release status.

In May 2005 Turbine, Inc. announced that they had acquired exclusive rights to create massively multiplayer online role-playing games based on the novel by Tolkien Enterprises, and launched The Lord of the Rings Online: Shadows of Angmar on 24 April 2007. Initially, the game covered the region of Eriador, from the Grey Havens to the Misty Mountains, and about as far north and south, but subsequent updates and expansion packs have more than doubled the game world, including areas such as Moria, Lothlórien, Mirkwood, Isengard and Rohan. The game is based on the books and Turbine's licence explicitly prohibits them from including any story or design elements unique to the movie adaptations. On the other hand, this allowed game designers to include lesser-known areas and references to the events, which are absent from the movies. The first expansion to The Lord of the Rings Online was released on 18 November 2008, entitled Mines of Moria. The next expansion, Siege of Mirkwood, was released on 1 December 2009. The third expansion titled Rise of Isengard went live on 27 September 2011 and included the areas of Dunland, the Gap of Rohan and Isengard where the tower of Orthanc is located. The fourth expansion, Riders of Rohan, was released on 15 October 2012, featuring The Eaves of Fangorn and eastern part of Rohan up to the East Wall. The fifth expansion, Helm's Deep, launched in November 2013 and added the remainder of the Rohan landscape.

The Lord of the Rings: Conquest produced by Pandemic Studios using the same engine used in Star Wars: Battlefront was released in early 2009 on the PC and all seventh-generation video game systems except the Wii and PSP. All versions received mixed reviews, with the Nintendo DS version garnering slightly better reviews. The game also marked the end of Electronic Arts licence, which had already been extended some months so that the game could be completed. Subsequently, the licence, obtained via Tolkien Enterprises, passed to Warner Bros.

=== The Warner Bros. era (2010–2022) ===
After Warner Bros. gained the licence to publish Middle-earth video games, the first game to be published under this new licence holder would be The Lord of the Rings: Aragorn's Quest, an action-adventure retelling of the Peter Jackson film trilogy from Aragorn's perspective, on Nintendo and Sony video game platforms, with Wii and PlayStation 3 versions taking advantage of motion controls to simulate sword, shield and bow combat.

The 2010s saw the release of three darker and more violent Middle-earth video games that were rated Mature by the ESRB. The first of such games was The Lord of the Rings: War in the North, an action role-playing game that takes place in Northern Middle-earth. It was developed by Snowblind Studios and released on 1 November 2011. Then Monolith Productions developed a two-game, non-canon Middle-earth: Shadow spin-off series, set between the events of The Hobbit and The Lord of the Rings. The main protagonist of these two action RPGs is a Ranger named Talion who bonds with the Elf spirit Celebrimbor, gaining wraith-like powers to deal with adversaries. The first game, Middle-earth: Shadow of Mordor was released in 2014, with its sequel, Middle-earth: Shadow of War, released in 2017.

In that same decade, Warner Bros. released Lego The Lord of the Rings and Lego The Hobbit, two family-friendly Lego video game adaptations of the Lord of the Rings film trilogy, The Hobbit: An Unexpected Journey and The Hobbit: The Desolation of Smaug. In 2019, The Lord of the Rings: Adventure Card Game was released, a digital adaptation of the physical card game, and the first-ever Middle-Earth video game available on the Nintendo Switch.

=== The Embracer Group era (2022–present) ===
In 2022, Warner Bros. Games lost the rights to publish Middle-Earth games, after the sale of Middle-earth Enterprises to Embracer Group, the parent company of THQ Nordic. Various companies then stepped up to develop or publish their own Middle-Earth games licensed by MEE.

An action-adventure game, titled The Lord of the Rings: Gollum and focusing on the titular character, was announced by Daedalic Entertainment in March 2019. The game was originally scheduled for release in 2021, which would end up being pushed to 2022, until publisher Nacon announced a release date of 25 May 2023 for Microsoft Windows and various non-Nintendo consoles available at the time, with a Nintendo Switch version being planned. The game was released to generally negative reviews, and the Switch version remains unreleased as of 2025.

Ahead of Gollum's initial release, a new mobile game, titled The Lord of the Rings: Heroes of Middle-earth, was released for iOS and Android on May 10, 2023 by Electronic Arts, and was the first game to be released by the publisher since 2009's The Lord of the Rings: Conquest. It is a turn-based role-playing game developed by EA Capital Games that plays similarly to its previously developed Star Wars: Galaxy of Heroes. However, nearly a year after worldwide launch, Electronic Arts prematurely ended support for the game, shutting it down on May 24, 2024, amidst the turmoil of the 2023–2024 video game industry layoffs that affected the company's development projects.

The Lord of the Rings: Return to Moria is a survival-crafting multiplayer game for ninth-generation consoles (PlayStation 5 and Xbox Series) and computers, developed by Free Range Games and published by North Beach Games, first released on October 24, 2023 on Microsoft Windows. The story takes place during the Fourth Age and follows a company of dwarves as they try to retake their homeland Moria and restore the long-lost ancient kingdom of Khazad-dûm. In 2024 Weta Workshop announced a non-violent Middle-Earth game about the peaceful life of Hobbits in the Shire, titled Tales of the Shire: A Lord of the Rings Game, which was released by Private Division on July 29, 2025 on the same platforms as Return to Moria, plus the Nintendo Switch.

In 2026, Warhorse Studios confirmed that a new open-world RPG which is set to take place in the Middle-earth is in development.

== Unofficial games and mods ==
Unofficial games include Shadowfax (1982) by Postern, a simplistic side-scrolling action game for the Spectrum, C64, and VIC-20, in which Gandalf rides the titular steed while smiting endless Nazgûl. Some of the most enduring unlicensed games are Moria (1983), a roguelike based loosely on The Fellowship of the Ring (and unrelated to a 1975 game of the same name with only scant connection to Tolkien); its various forks such as Angband (1990), loosely based on The Silmarillion; Elendor (1991), a MUSH based on Tolkien in general; and two MUDs based on The Lord of the Rings: MUME (Multi-Users in Middle-earth) (1992) and The Two Towers (1994).

A homebrew text adventure was created for the Atari 2600, based on The Fellowship of the Ring, by Adam Thornton. The game, which is separate and not related to the unreleased Parker Brothers game, was self-published in 2002.

Tolkien-inspired mods and custom maps have been made for many games, such as Heroes of Might and Magic, Warcraft III, Neverwinter Nights, Rome: Total War, Medieval 2: Total War, Warlords 3, The Elder Scrolls V: Skyrim, Mount & Blade, Age of Empires II: The Age of Kings, and Age of Wonders. The game Minecraft has been used extensively as a tool to recreate Middle-earth, most notably the servers MCME (Minecraft Middle Earth) and ArdaCraft, in addition to large-scale mods like The Lord of the Rings Mod: Bringing Middle-earth to Minecraft. Furthermore, The Middle-Earth DEM Project released a playable dataset compiled for Outerra's engine which attempts to model the terrain of the full Middle-earth in great detail and to feature notable landmarks within the world as 3D models.

Delta 4 released the two parody games Bored of the Rings (1985, not directly based on the Harvard Lampoon parody novel of the same name), and The Boggit (1986).

== See also ==
- List of Middle-earth role-playing games
