= The Lord of the Rings Online: Mordor =

- Developer: Standing Stone Games
- Publisher: Daybreak Game Company
- Composer: Chance Thomas
- Engine: Turbine G3
- Platform: Microsoft Windows
- Release: July 31, 2017
- Genre: Massively multiplayer online role-playing
- Mode: Multiplayer

The Lord of the Rings Online: Mordor is the sixth expansion for The Lord of the Rings Online MMORPG, released on July 31, 2017. It raised the game's level cap from 105 to 115 and added a new Plateau of Gorgoroth region in Mordor, which the Free Peoples of Middle-Earth begin to explore following the downfall of Sauron, as well as a new cluster of end-game Instances and a Raid.

The release of Mordor expansion coincided with the Ninth and final Book of Volume IV: The Strength of Sauron which depicted the destruction of The One Ring and the following celebration at the Field of Cormallen in Ithilien. To signify the importance of concluding the main story of The Lord of the Rings, the next Epic Story is not called a "Volume" but rather simply "The Black Book of Mordor". Unlike the preceding Epic Quests which were available to free-to-play players or those subscribers who did not purchase previous expansions, the access to the "Black Book of Mordor" requires the purchase of either "Mordor" or the subsequent Minas Morgul expansion.

== Storyline ==
=== Chapter 1 - Where the Shadows Lie ===
With the Dark Lord defeated and the Black Gate overthrown, the Free Peoples of Middle-Earth venture into Mordor for the first time in a thousand years. Some are searching for knowledge, some for treasure and some - for vengeance against Sauron's remaining servants. While exploring the former Gondorian fortress of Durthang, the player accidentally releases a fearsome Easterling chieftain among other prisoners. The player chases the Easterling named Ayorzén and, after capturing him, delivers him to Gandalf for questioning.

=== Chapter 2 - The Light of Eärendil ===
An unexpected messenger emerges from the Black Land: the Mouth of Sauron survived the downfall of his master and has proclaimed himself Sauron's Heir and The Ruler of Mordor. He asks to treat with King Elessar, who chooses the player as his representative. His tone changed since the battle at the Black Gate, the Mouth of Sauron offers to recognize Aragorn's authority as the King of Gondor and become his subject in exchange for being allowed to rule what remained of Mordor. Though his terms are absolutely rejected, the offer itself betrays his weakness and reveals that Sauron's Heir's dominion over Mordor is far from the total that he boasts.

=== Chapter 3 - The Gúrzyul ===
The interrogation of Ayorzén reveals that Mordor still poses many dangers as the Gúrzyul, powerful servants of Sauron, have unlike the Nazgûl outlasted their master and still present a great threat for the Free Peoples. The player ventures deep into Mordor to find more about the Gúrzyul and learns that they are former mortals whose lives have been unnaturally extended by Sauron, though unlike the Nazgûl they are still tied to their bodies and can be slain. Other than the Mouth of Sauron the known Gúrzyul are Captain of the Pit Ugrukhôr, Urudanî Stonemaiden, and Lhaereth the Stained, Sauron's chief poisoner who was responsible for the Great Plague that ravaged Eriador, Rhovanion and Gondor 1,500 years ago. For his valuable information, Ayorzén is offered a royal pardon and allowed to stay in the Kingdom of Gondor.

=== Chapter 4 - Union of Evil ===
An intercepted message reveals that the Gúrzyul and the other Masters of Mordor prepare for a joint meeting. Their unification could spell the doom for the Free Peoples and the player is sent to observe the meetings in the rags of a slave prisoner. At the meeting the Mouth of Sauron announces his alliance with Lhaereth, whom he intends to wed, but Lhaereth betrays and poisons him, blaming him for enabling Lord Sauron's defeat. Lhaereth then claims dominion over Mordor and the other Gúrzyul recognize her authority, uniting the forces of Mordor.

=== Chapter 5 - Legacy of the Necromancer ===
One of the Gúrzyul, Karazgar the Weeping Warrior, was suspiciously absent from the meeting and in fact from Gorgoroth itself. A rumour that he is seeking an artifact of Sauron in Dol Guldur is enough to give even Gandalf worry and the Wizard sends the player away from Mordor to find and stop the Weeping Warrior's plans. At the Hill of Sorcery the player meets with the Lord and Lady of Lothlorien and King Thranduil of the Wood-Elves. The player makes one last trip into the dungeons of Dol Guldur where they find Sigileth of the Hidden Guard, missing and believed dead since the events of the Siege of Mirkwood. With no sign of Karazgar or the artifact that he sought, they escape the fortress and Lady Galadriel brings down its walls for good. King Thranduil then invites the player to his Halls, where scholars seek to study and cleanse the artifacts reclaimed from the dark fortress.

=== Chapter 6 - Wood, Lake, Mountain, and Stone ===
The player journeys to Felegoth, the Halls of Wood-Elves in the forest now known as Eryn Lasgalen, and Gandalf himself soon joins them. Relics from Dol Guldur share no insight into Karazgar's plans and the White Wizard bids the player to continue to the Lonely Mountain. On their way there, the player learns that the Weeping Warrior is indeed in the North, stirring trouble in Lake-town and seeking the bones of the dragon Smaug for some unknown purpose. Upon reaching Erebor the player learns that the craftsmanship of the Dwarves has been in decline for years and that some believe the cause to be tied to the Arkenstone. To make sure that the jewel has not been stolen, King Thorin III Stonehelm gives Gandalf permission to open the tomb of his namesake. In the presence of surviving members of the company of Thorin Oakenshield and his sister Dís, Gandalf opens his tomb and finds the Arkenstone where it was laid to rest, beginning to doubt that Karazgar is after any specific artifact.

=== Chapter 7 - The Iron Hills ===
King Thorin III Stonehelm bids the player to go to Iron Hills and bring back his son Durin VII, who had been kept away from Erebor during the War of the Ring. Accompanied by several dwarves, the player journeys into the Ironfold, where after greeting King's brother Nain they make a worrying discovery: a secret door in a dwarf-home reveals a hidden chamber which contains a single tome with an Eye of Sauron on the cover.

=== Chapter 8 - The Grey Mountains ===
Lord Nain orders the relic of Mordor to be gone from his Halls and the player offers to take it to Gandalf. During their and Durin's journey back to Erebor they come across a large band of Zhélruka, a clan of dwarves from the East on their way to Grey Mountains, believing that those ancient dwarven holdings may now be reclaimed with the Dark Lord defeated. The player delivers the Black Book to Gandalf in Erebor but learns that Durin has disobeyed the order of his father and joined the band of Zhélruka. King Thorin orders the player to bring his son back, but the young prince who had been denied the chance to earn glory during the war is determined to prove his worth in another way. The Zhélruka dwarves establish a foothold in an abandoned dwarven keep of old when Karazgar makes his presence known and gives them one chance to leave, promising to kill all who choose to stay in this land. The dwarves are determined to fight, but the Weeping Warrior shows mastery over the frost-drakes of the North, sending them against the dwarves and causing them serious casualties.

=== Chapter 9 - The Grey Mountains ===
Even knowing the power of their enemy, the dwarves remain determined to fight and send a band to go on offensive against Karazgar and his drakes. As the player helps with preparations against another assault, Gandalf arrives to inform them that the Black Book is written in many ciphers and arcane languages, which will take a while to translate. The dwarven expedition succeeds and they believe the Weeping Warrior to be on the run, but instead he enters their fortress by a hidden entrance, killing all in his path until he comes across the White Wizard himself. Seeing the Black Book of Mordor, Karazgar immediately desires to possess it, but Gandalf easily overpowers him, causing him to flee.

=== Chapter 10 - The Vales of Anduin ===
With the Black Book now being a focus of attention of a powerful foe, Gandalf decides to bring it away from the Grey Mountains and determines the nearest safest place to be Grimbeorn's Lodge in the Vale of Anduin. The player accompanies the Wizard there and Gandalf muses over the nearby Gladden Fields, where the One Ring was once lost and lay hidden for over two thousand years. Grimbeorn soon finds himself with more guests than just the two of them, as Lord Elrond and much of his household pass through the same lands on their way to Minas Tirith, where Aragorn and Arwen's wedding shall soon take place.

=== Interlude: Shades in the Swamp ===
While the Wise rest under Grimbeorn's roof, Gandalf brings the player's attention to the recent disturbance in the Gladden Fields, where shades of the dead have been seen by local Woodmen. The player ventures forth to investigate, accompanied by Gandalf, Lord Elrond and Glorfindel. Together they discover that the River-Maiden of Gladden (a spirit of the same nature as Tom Bombadil's wife Goldberry) has been keeping the shade of a Man in deep slumber for an untold number of years. To their amazement, Elrond recognizes the shade as the spirit of none other than Isildur himself.

The Black Book storyline concludes in the Minas Morgul expansion.

== New zones ==
The Mordor expansions adds Mordor itself as the new section of Middle-Earth, the first region of which was the Plateau of Gorgoroth. The Plateau itself is further divided into five distinct areas, each with a separate storyline and a set of Deeds:

- Udun: The area of Mordor directly beyond the now ruined Black Gate of Mordor where the weapons for the armies of Sauron were forged.
- Dor Amarth: The area to the north of Mount Doom reaching up to the Mountaints of Shadow and also containing the ruins of Barad-Dur.
- Lhingris: The vale between the Western Mountains of Mordor and the Morgai, which contains the Tower of Cirith Ungol and the entrance to the Shelob's Lair.
- Talath Urui: The plain to the south of Orodruin, the eruption of which had created in it a lake of molten lava and fire, dangerous to all but the most deadly servants of Sauron.
- Agarnaith: The area to the east of Mount Doom and to the south of Barad-Dur. Agarnaith is a blood-red swamp created by the experiments of Sauron's chief poisoner, who in the past was responsible for The Great Plague.

== Gameplay enhancements ==
Mordor introduced three new gameplay elements: disenchanting, Shadow of Mordor and the Allegiance system.

"Disenchanting" refers to destroying a piece of equipment from Mordor in exchange for an amount of new currency (originally "Ash of Gorgoroth", later renamed to Motes/Embers) which can be spend on end-game equipment. This process allows the player to receive something of value for undesirable or unusable rewards from quests and instances, while previously unwanted gear bound to a character could only be sold to vendors for a meager amount of silver.

"Shadow of Mordor" is a regional effect present in landscape and instances of Mordor which gives the player's character a progressive debuff as they venture deeper into the Land of Shadow. Much like the Gloom/Radiance mechanic from the Mines of Moria expansion, "Shadow of Mordor" can only be countered by a new stat called "Light of Earendil" which is present on gear awarded in Mordor. The next level increase granted all characters a set amount of Light of Earendil to compensate the lack of it on the new tier of equipment.

The Allegiance system is similar but separate to the existing Reputation Factions and allows the players to pledge their Allegiance to one of the four factions: "The Kingdom of Gondor", "Hobbits of the Company", "Durin's Folk" and "The Court of Lothlórien". Each Allegiance has 30 Ranks which unlock both equipment rewards and a unique storyline for each Allegiance, and players can choose whether to exchange the Relics they receive from adventuring in Mordor for equipment or consume them to advance their Allegiance Rank. Players can decide to eventually complete all four Allegiances, but after the first one they each require progressively more Allegiance points to max out.

The Kingdom of Gondor storyline begins with the coronation of Aragorn and deals with the new challenges he faces as the first King of Gondor in over a millennium. The Court of Lothlórien storyline depicts the impending attack of the Elves of Lothlórien and Mirkwood against Dol Guldur as well as the preparations of Elrond's household to their travel south and Lady Arwen's wedding. The Durin's Folk storyline shows Thorin III Stonehelm, the new King Under the Mountain, coming to lead his people after the death of his father Dain Ironfoot in the last days of the War of the Ring. The Hobbits of the Company storyline is more lighthearted compared to the others and focuses on Merry and Pippin's affairs in the time before the Hobbits set out for their journey back to The Shire.

== Soundtrack ==
Music for the Mordor expansion was once again composed by Chance Thomas, whose last contribution to the game was the Riders of Rohan soundtrack five years prior. It was released as a digital download album which received favorable reviews.

== Critical reception ==
MMORPG.com gave the expansion a 7.0/10, praising the storytelling and the new landscape, but noting that the new game systems felt too similar to what came before and criticizing the pricing of the expansion.
