= The Lord of the Rings Online: Helm's Deep =

- Developer: Turbine, Inc.
- Publishers: Turbine, Inc.
- Engine: Turbine G3
- Platform: Microsoft Windows
- Release: November 20, 2013
- Genre: MMORPG
- Mode: Multiplayer

The Lord of the Rings Online: Helm's Deep is the fifth expansion for the MMORPG The Lord of the Rings Online. It was released on November 20, 2013, after it was postponed by two days from the original release date, due to a power outage. The expansion is available for download both on the web and on Steam. The Battle at Helm's Deep is created in-game using refined technologies that Turbine created during the development of the expansion, which allow for a significantly larger amount of action and character models during a session. The new expansion increases the in-games level cap to 95, and one of the main new features is the ability to fight "epic"-scale battles such as the Battle of Helm's Deep. The expansion also adds modified trait trees and five new zones to explore in Western Rohan.

In Helm's Deep, Turbine chose to provide a more lore-accurate portrayal of the Battle of Helm's Deep from Tolkien's work, as opposed to the film adaption by Peter Jackson, where some details were modified or omitted. As a result of this, several important events that occurred in the books but did not make it to the film are depicted in-game, such as clashes at Helm's Dike in front of the fortress, and the Glittering Caves of Aglarond.

== Storyline ==
Helm's Deep concludes the storyline that began shortly after the Siege of Mirkwood expansion and continued in the Rise of Isengard and Riders of Rohan.

=== Volume III: Allies of the King ===
==== Book 11 - The Golden Hall ====
As the refugees of the city of Byre Tor prepare to leave their temporary cave shelter, the player and his travelling companions decide that the news of Saruman's atrocities in Wildermore must be reported to King Theoden despite the penalty for breaking their banishment. To avoid angering him even further with the presence of a Dunlending woman, Nona and the Elf Corudan escort the refuges to the nearest surviving city of Forlaw, while the Rohirrim men Horn and Gleowine together with the player ride to Edoras. Their timing turns out to be most fortunate, as they seek audience just after Gandalf has arrived and woken the King from a long slumber. Éomer is released from imprisonment, Grima Wormtongue is thrown out of the court and after a short preparation, King Theoden musters his army to ride forth and meet the forces of Isengard head-on. Gandalf, Aragorn, Legolas, Gimli, Eomer and Gleowine depart with the King's riders while the player and Horn stay behind in Edoras to assist Lady Eowyn, who has been ordered by her uncle to bring both citizens of Edoras and the refugees from other corners on Rohan into the safety of Dunharrow.

==== Book 12 - War in the Westemnet ====
After making arrangements for bringing a large number of civilians to Dunharrow, the player and Horn fulfill the promise given earlier to Eomer by visiting his home town of Aldburg and confirming that his regent manages to lead the people in his absence. They are caught up with by Nona and Corudan and the whole party returns to Edoras. Before Eowyn and the refugees can depart, it is revealed that a servant of Wormtongue remained undiscovered in the city and is now actively engaging in both sabotage and murder. Before the spy can be apprehended, he flees Edoras and the player's party sets out to chase him through the lands of Westemnet, which are now besieged by the White Hand forces. After conversing with Thane Herubrand of Woodhurst and his son Herefara, they learn that a war band of Dunlendings bearing the sign of a Talon of the Falcon has been seen marauding in the area. Both the player and Nona desire revenge on the Falcon Clan, which had betrayed their Ranger friends to Saruman in Dunland. Before they can act however, a more urgent message arrives: the Fords of Isen have fallen to the enemy, their defenders Elfhelm, Grimbold and Erkenbrand are nowhere to be found, a massive army from Isengard marches through the Westfold and King Theoden's forces have taken refuge at Helm's Deep. The party splits once more: Nona is unwilling to abandon her quest for vengeance and Horn is unwilling to leave her, so they set out to track the Falcon clan, while the player and Corudan ride to Helm's Deep. On their way they meet Gandalf the White, who advised the King to turn his army to Helm's Deep and now is seeking far and wide for the survivors of the second battle of the Fords of Isen. After Gandalf finds Elfhelm's eored, Elfhelm relays to him the recent news: the force that came from Isengard was many thousands strong and Erkenbrand and his men were driven south of the Fords, beyond the river Isen. Seeing their situation hopeless, Elfhelm chose to retreat and, despite Grimbold's protests, took his men back into Rohan before Saruman's army poured through the Fords in their wake. Gandalf orders Elfhelm to protect Edoras, which now sits empty, and travels to the Fords to find Grimbold. His men almost all dead, Grimbold refuses to abandon the Fords, where Prince Theodred now lays buried. Gandalf helps him reconnect with Erkenbrand and leads the combined force to Helm's Deep.

==== Book 13 - Helm's Deep ====
The player manages to arrive to Helm's Deep just before the gates are closed in preparations for the battle. Erkenbrand, the military commander of Hornburg, took most of the defenders and weapons with him to the Fords, so the King's army can only supplement itself with refugee villagers and makeshift weapons. As the night falls, the White Hand forces begin to arrive and Gamling the Old holds them for a short while at Helm's Dike, before being overwhelmed and retreating into the fortress. Orcs, Uruks and Dunlendings assault the Deeping Wall and the defenders led by Aragorn manage to hold them off, until a section of the wall is blown and the enemy pours into the Deeping Comb. Eomer, Gimli and the player are trapped in the Glittering Caves and have to protect the refugees hidden there. Their plan to lead the refugees away through the secret mountain tunnels fails when it is revealed that those passages are already known to the enemy - a group of Dunlendings emerges in the caves from a direction though safe and is led by Lhue Brenin, the Chieftain of the Falcon clan. With Gimli's help, the player manages to slay him and exact vengeance upon the Dunedain slain in Tal Methedras. As the dawn comes, Theoden chooses to ride forth with the remaining able riders and meet the enemy head-on. The sound of the Horn of Helm Hammerhand shatters the morale of Saruman's minions, as Theoden, Legolas and Aragorn cut through their ranks. It is then that Gandalf arrives, with Grimbold and Erkenbrand leading a combined force of footmen and riders. The Dunlendings surrender en-masse and the Orcs and Uruks try to flee into Westfold, only to be trapped by the arrival of Huorns from the Fangorn Forest. In the aftermath of the battle, fallen are counted in many numbers, but the White Hand army is destroyed and Rohan still stands.

==== Book 14 - The Breaking of Isengard ====
King Theoden, Eomer, Gandalf, Aragorn, Legolas, Gimli and the player set out for Isengard. As they approach the Gap of Rohan, they are met by Halbarad and the remaining Rangers of the Grey Company, their long ride to the aid of their chieftain Aragorn complete at last (this is the first time where the Epic storyline contradicts the Lord of the Rings books, as the Rangers are not supposed to meet Aragorn until after visiting Isengard). At the gates of the now flooded Isengard, the company finds Peregrin and Merdiadoc. The Hobbits relay the tale of their escape from Saruman's Uruks, meeting with Treebeard, the Entmoot and the march of the Ents on Isengard. Gandalf, Theoden and Aragorn set out to confront Saruman, while the Rangers begin to search for their kinsman Lothrandir, who has been imprisoned in Isengard since the Falcon Clan's betrayal in Dunland. In a section of the wall that escaped destruction by the Ents but is quickly being flooded, the Rangers begin opening prison cells until they finally discover a man in the signature Grey Company outfit. To their horror, the rescued prisoner is completely broken in body and mind alike: his face is mutilated beyond recognition and his shallow eyes do not seem to recognize his friends. He only manages to utter a single word before collapsing and dying, a broken shadow of the strong-willed man Lothrandir once was. However, while mourning their fallen friend, the Rangers discover that it was not Lothrandir underneath the garbs. Despite using the magic to torture his body and mind in horrific ways, Saruman failed to break the Dunadan and in an act of corrupted twisted cruelty had him switch garbs with a prisoner from Dunland. Continuing the search, the player finally finds Lothrandir in another cell - beaten, bruised and weakened, but very much alive and sane. At the same time, Gandalf breaks Saruman's staff and casts him out the Order of the Wizards and the White Council. Treebeard promises to keep watch over the Wizard now trapped in his tower, while Pippin briefly comes in contact with the Palantír thrown out by Grima Wormtongue. Aragorn is much rejoiced over both finding his captured kinsman alive and ending Saruman's threat to Rohan and extends his thanks to all of his allies: the Fellowship, the Dunedain, the Rohirrim and the player alike.

Book 14 is the end for the "Volume III: Allies of the King" storyline. The next major storyline: "Volume IV: The Strength of Sauron" began in March 2015.

== New zones ==
The Helm's Deep expansion adds the in-game region of Western Rohan, sub-divided into Broadacres, Stonedeans, the Kingstead, the Westfold and the Eastfold, with the major settlements including Edoras, Aldburg, Dunharrow and the fortress of the Hornburg. The regions of West Rohan are depicted during the invasion Isengard's forces during the War of the Ring in the prelude to the Battle of Helm's Deep, and many settlements have been destroyed in their onslaught. Many of the more minor features of Rohan which played little part in the books and were omitted from the movies altogether appear in the expansion, such as the Púkel-Men that line the road to Dunharrow. The new regions create a new landscape link between the lands of Eriador and Rhovanion for the first time since the Mines of Moria expansion in 2008.

=== Broadacres ===
The Broadacres are under assault by the Warg riders of Saruman, and catastrophe looms as the flames encroach on the Riders' settlements. In the north, the village of Torsbury is assaulted by Dunlendings, pressing their invasion out of the Stonedeans. A flat and fertile land of rich soil and swaying, grey-green grass, growing so high in places that it reaches the knees of a man on horseback. The land is among the least rocky in the Mark, and while a few chestnuts and elms dot the landscape, most of it is treeless. The Broadacres is ruled by Fríthild, the sole female Reeve in the Mark. A shield-maiden by birth and training, she was the only child of the former knight, Fríthgist, who raised her like a son. When Éowyn visited Edoras as a child, Fríthild treated her like a foster-sister. Ever since, Éowyn has wanted to follow her footsteps and wield a sword in battle.

=== Stonedeans ===
The men of Dunland, with help from Saruman's Orcs and Uruk-hai, control a great deal of the Stonedeans. They prepare to cross the river-gorge at Brockbridge, where a few brave men hold back an endless tide threatening to wash over northern Stonedeans. A region among the foothills of the Misty Mountains, the Stonedeans consists of crags, broken stones, tall oaks and firs, and rushing rivers. A source of many of the metals worked by the Rohirrim, particularly iron mined from the low mountains that surround Nan Curunír. This Riding among all others in Rohan is the most similar to Dunland. Historically poor and uncivilized compared with the remainder of the Westemnet, the Stonedeans have seen many marriages between Eorlingas the Dunlendings. Rohirrim from more prosperous lands even call it "Deanland" in jest.

=== Kingstead ===
From atop Edoras, King Théoden has ruled Kingstead and the entire Mark. Gríma Wormtongue's counsel has made the King increasingly feeble and suspicious. Following his son Théodred's death, Théoden fell into a depression. Kingstead, the royal Riding of the Mark, is described as among the most fertile of all Rohan's provinces. It has stretches of grassland and farms scattered between the rivers Snowbourn and Swiftwater. Behind Edoras, deep into the White Mountains, lies the valley of Harrowdale, which was once plagued by Orcs that were wiped out over a century ago by King Folca the Hunter. Some characters believe that not all the Orcs were slain, and that some are waiting for a chance to exact vengeance upon the Mark.

=== Westfold ===
Ravaged and burned by servants of Isengard, the Westfold has crumbled into disarray. Its leaders scatter and lose skirmishes as they attempt to regroup. The great refuge of Helm's Deep is the Rohirrim's last hope, and it is upon these sparsely defended walls that the enemy hordes will soon assault. Rocky meadows dotted by elms and alders, many chopped and hewn by raiders, the Westfold is cut by the rushing river of Swiftwater. Three other rivers, the Deeping-stream, the Grimbrook, and the Woodwell, flow from the White Mountains, their banks peppered with stony outcroppings. Helm's Deep is protected by a raised and semi-fortified earthwork known as Helm's Dike and the ancient Númenórean keep, the Hornburg. Beyond the Hornburg, the mighty Deeping-wall shelters the rest of the valley. The Deeping-stream runs through the wall's base.

=== Eastfold ===
Located on the far side of the realm, away from Isengard, the Eastfold has seen little of Saruman's savagery, but is not at peace. Long thought destroyed and starved for vengeance, the Orcs of the White Mountains stir once more through Sauron's dark will. Eastfold's lands divide into three areas: the Folde, the Fenmarch, and the Everholt. The Folde is rich farmland that has long served the realm. The Fenmarch blooms with wildflowers, tussocks, reeds. Everholt is an old oak forest and royal hunting ground running uphill to the White Mountains. Home of Éomer, Third Marshal of the Riddermark, Eastfold is among the oldest Ridings in the Mark; it was the seat of Eorl the Young when he first became King. The capital moved to Edoras during the reign of his son Brego, but the Eastfold remains the site of many important moments of Rohan's history.

== Epic Battles ==
One of the most important new features of the expansion is the new game mode called "Epic Battles". Players of The Lord of the Rings Online will be able to participate in an epic battle as early as level ten, when they will be automatically enhanced to level 95 to join the battle. The Battle of Helm's deep is the first of a series of large-scale engagements between the Free People's and the forces under Saruman and Sauron to be represented in-game. This new addition replaces the more traditional endgame content such as raids or instances, and during it one can play solo or in groups of two, three, six, or twelve.

=== Merit and Medals ===
As the outcome of the Battle for the Hornburg is immutable according to Tolkien's writing, Turbine has opted to add a system called "Merit and Medals" to reinforce the actions that the player takes in the defence of Helm's Deep. The purpose of the Merit and Medals system is to fill in some of the details of the battle that were not presented in the book, and give players a chance to influence the direction of the battle. Each Epic Battle features a primary objective in the defence of the Hornburg and survival of Rohan. In addition to these primary objectives, there are also secondary objectives that provide unique opportunities, such as saving injured soldiers while Uruk-hai invade, or rescuing horses threatened by White Hand assassins. Every objective, primary or otherwise, rewards a Medal: bronze, silver, gold, or platinum. The higher medals will reward the player with things such as rare armor and accessories, and points to spend on epic battle promotions.

Each quest has a starting amount of Merit: empty, partial or full. A player's current merit is displayed as a bar in the in-game quest tracker, showing the medal the player is currently set to earn, and progress towards the next tier up. The maximum amount of Merit players can have on a quest at any point is determined by how complete the objectives of that quest are. This is displayed as a percentage next to the quest name. Actions that add or remove Merit are listed below the bar in red or green, with an indicator of how many times they have been triggered. The difficulty of an objective is directly determined by how many of the merit points the player wishes to earn. The more soldiers the player tries to keep alive, the harder it will be, but the greater the reward if the player succeeds. If the player chooses to abandon a squad of them, the job will be easier, but the reward will also be less. The difficulty dynamically adjusts based on how much the player wishes to attempt at any given moment for an objective.

=== Roles ===
There are three classes that players can choose to play as during an epic battle: the Vanguard, the Engineer, and the Officer. The Vanguard can use powerful attacks and defenses to defeat the enemy in battle, as well as being able to call on several Epic Battle abilities such as a volley of arrows or to stun surrounding enemies. The Engineer's role is to strategically place siege equipment to use against the enemy, lay devastating traps, and apply powders to projectiles that add effects to weaken the incoming enemy. Engineers can also use the deadly siege weaponry stationed at Helm's Deep to scatter enemy forces before the walls. The Officer heals troops on the brink of defeat and grants defensive benefits to reinforce their allies' defenses. As a veteran, the Officer commands from afar, orders troops to counter enemy assaults, and can raise banners of war to embolden the defense. These roles are not fixed during an Epic Battle, and players are able to switch between them as the need arises.

=== Priority targets ===
The Epic Battles system in Helm's Deep uses a different type of NPC threat calculation (deciding on targets) than in other aspects of the game. These changes are similar in aspect to other changes that were released with the expansion, but the threat system in the Epic Battles is more specific and focused. Every different class of non-player character is now programmed to seek out specific player threats and make their elimination a priority.

This new process uses a point value system for each potential target in the battle, with points adjusted by distance, combat state, target priority and other factors. For the most part, players will be able to operate at their leisure, using siege equipment and issuing commands, without having to worry about accidentally being attacked by non-player characters for minor actions that would previously grab the AI's attention. Classes that attract attention from NPCs by relying heavily upon defense in combat will still be able to draw aggression, but the rear-guard support classes will be able to do their jobs without drawing the same attention from NPCs as they previously did.

=== Promotions and rewards ===
Promotions function in a similar regard to the class "talent tree". Medals from the quests translate into promotion points, which are used to make the player more effective at different aspects of the Epic Battles. Bronze medals are worth 1 point, silver is worth 2, gold is 3 and platinum is 4. Getting the maximum number of points requires receiving platinum medals for every quest. The promotions system only uses the highest value for determining points, so the player only has to achieve platinum once to earn the maximum points for each quest.

The promotion system allows for complete hybridization. New tiers of promotion traits are unlocked across the board as the player spend points, and the cost is the same regardless of which role they are spent on. If a player wants to put extreme emphasis on one promotion tree, they can spend points solely on that tree, but they can also achieve a mix of promotions for all three roles if they so choose instead. Higher-tier traits cost more than lower-tier traits, but the costs are even between the different trees, and hybrid builds are very effective.

In addition to the promotions window is the expertise panel. These skills are unlocked by spending points in the trees in the right-hand panel. The deeper the player goes into a given line, the more expertise traits are unlocked in that line. Expertise traits are unlocks that accentuate their given line - new ammo types for Engineers, more order types for Officers, and different damaging effects for Vanguards.

== Gameplay enhancements ==
An important new features of Helm's Deep is a modification of the games class "trait tree" system. Beginning at level 6, Trait Trees offer a selection of powerful Specializations (Specs) that enhance players' characters. Trait points are gained by leveling-up and completing Deeds, and higher levels unlock additional builds to switch between when outside combat. Each class has unique Specs that embody a clear combat style, whether it's the Minstrel healing Spec or the Champion Morale tank Spec. As players allocate points they receive bonuses, like enhanced passives, new powerful skills, and significant skill upgrades. This enhancement to the class system enables players to develop their characters along one specialization if they choose, or mix and match traits from all three trees, as described by associate producer Hannah Foell:

We're moving to a trait tree system for classes. We thought it made a lot of sense for us. It's an understood system - we did it with mounted combat and we found it to be very successful. And it something our players already understand, so it's a system within which we can work. Each class has three different trait lines that you can spec out, so you specialize very heavily in one line at a time. And then you can specialize in a couple of different other ways and save them as different specs and then you can switch between them as much as you want.

In addition to this, there have also been in-game enhancements to coincide with the increase of the maximum level to 95. These changes include new legendary items, virtues, and a tier 9 crafting expansion. Other changes are additions to housing chests, a mithril coin system, a removal of travel skill material requirements, and modifications made to the games combat engine.

== Soundtrack ==
Composer Chance Thomas did not return to compose the soundtrack for Helm's Deep even though his previous compositions for the game were positively received by both fans and critics. A week prior to the original release date of November 18, Turbine released the entire soundtrack for the expansion on SoundCloud. The soundtrack consists of twenty-five songs composed by Steve Digregorio. The music in the soundtrack is in a similar orchestral score to previous releases from The Lord of the Rings Online, with a tense and dramatic atmosphere.

== Critical reception ==
Reviews of Helm's Deep have been mixed. Ten Ton Hammer praised the class changes, the Epic Battles, and the quality of the landscape, but criticizing the musical score "a step backwards" from Riders of Rohan, the monetization that reduced the overall value of the expansion, and the small number of Epic Battles, giving Helm's Deep an overall rating of 90/100. GameFront was more critical, rating Helm's Deep 64/100.

"The problem with the big battles of Helm's Deep is that it's a story we all know, and it's possible the concept could have been stronger if Turbine had included other battles from Middle Earth's history for variety. All too quickly, the repetition grows tiring and the appeal wears thin, and that's true of the questing content as well." - GameFront. XGN rated Helm's Deep 7/10, and GameStar rated the expansion 67/100.
