= List of Middle-earth role-playing games =

This is a list of Middle-earth role-playing games. J. R. R. Tolkien's Middle-earth fictional universe has been the setting for several role-playing games.

== Tabletop role-playing games ==
This list covers stand-alone games; i.e. products supplying their own unique set of rules

- Middle-earth Role Playing (Iron Crown Enterprises, 1982)
- Lord of the Rings Adventure Game (Iron Crown Enterprises, 1991)
- The Lord of the Rings Roleplaying Adventure Game (Decipher, Inc., 2001)
- The Lord of the Rings Roleplaying Game (Decipher, Inc., 2002)
- The One Ring: Adventures over the Edge of the Wild (Cubicle 7, 2011)
  - The One Ring Roleplaying Game; 2nd Edition of Cubicle 7's game (Free League Publishing, 2022)

=== Supplements for playing in Middle-Earth ===
This list covers supplements for existing rule sets; i.e. products that require players to have access to a particular set of rules

- Adventures in Middle-earth (Open Game License (OGL) supplement to Dungeons & Dragons 5th edition by Cubicle 7, 2016)
  - The Lord of the Rings Roleplaying; an adaptation of The One Ring Roleplaying Game (OGL supplement by Free League, 2023)

== Role-playing video games ==
- Elendor (1991)
- MUME (1992)
- The Two Towers (1994)
- The Lord of the Rings: The Third Age (2004)
- The Lord of the Rings: Tactics (2005)
- The Lord of the Rings Online: Shadows of Angmar (2007)
- The Lord of the Rings: War in the North (2011)
- Middle-earth: Shadow of Mordor (2014)
- Middle-earth: Shadow of War (2017)

== Text-based role-playing Games ==
- World of Middle Earth (2020)

== See also ==
- Middle-earth in video games
