= Aglarond =

Aglarond may refer to:

- The Glittering Caves of Aglarond, in Tolkien's fictional Battle of Helm's Deep
- Aglarond, a fictional nation in Faerûn in the Dungeons & Dragons world of Forgotten Realms
