= The Lord of the Rings Online: Rise of Isengard =

- Developer: Turbine, Inc.
- Publishers: Turbine, Inc.
- Engine: Turbine G3
- Platform: Microsoft Windows
- Release: 27 September 2011
- Genre: MMORPG
- Mode: Multiplayer

The Lord of the Rings Online: Rise of Isengard is the third expansion pack for the MMORPG The Lord of the Rings Online, released on 27 September 2011 as a web-based download. The expansion was first announced on 19 November 2010 and made available for pre-order 7 June 2011, when Turbine announced a release date. Various pre-order deals were made available including special in-game titles and items. The Rise of Isengard closed-beta launched on 27 July and closed several weeks before live release.

The expansion increased the game's level cap to 75, added level 75 Legendary Items, a new crafting tier, a 24-man raid, and improved virtue traits. It also coincided with stat caps removal and several major class revisions; in particular the minstrel and the champion classes. Rise of Isengard brings the game's timeline to the events of The Two Towers. Players accompany the Grey Company as they ride to the aid of Aragorn, traveling through the new areas of Dunland, The Gap of Rohan, and Isengard, seat of Saruman the White. The Epic Story was advanced with Volume 3 Book 4: The Rise of Isengard and introduced the player to iconic characters such as Grimbold, Prince Théodred, Grima Wormtongue and Saruman the White.

== New Areas ==
The Lord of the Rings Online: Rise of Isengard expanded the world of Middle-earth by adding Dunland, the Gap of Rohan and Nan Curunír (Ring of Isengard). Both Dunland and the Gap of Rohan are divided into areas with self-contained storylines each.

=== Dunland ===
- Trum Dreng: The area in the north-western corner of Dunland where the locals are oppressed by Saruman's forces
- Bonevales: The area in the north of Dunland, where corruption of Lich Bluffs in Enedwaith spills into, resulting in the area being overrun by wights
- Pren Gwydh: The central area within Dunland, where the major hub of commerce Galtrev is located
- Starkmoor: The western area of Dunland, full of farmlands and traders
- Dunbog: A remote swamp area, where the few Dunlending settlers have to contend with the results of Saruman's vile experiments
- Carreglyn: The southern area of Dunland, where clans loyal to Saruman prepare for the war against Rohan
- Tâl Methedras: North-eastern area set on a mountain slope. The Grey Company falls into ambush in the town of Tur Morva
- Gravenwood: A wild forest in the eastern part of Dunland

=== Gap of Rohan ===
- Heathfells: The area around the hill of Dol Baran, full of hostile Dunlendings
- Isendale: The area directly adjancent to Isengard and Rohan, where Rohirrim soldiers keep watch over the Fords of Isen

== Storyline ==
=== Volume III: Allies of the King ===
Rise of Isengard continues the storyline that began shortly after Siege of Mirkwood expansion and is described in that article.

==== Book 4 - Rise of Isengard ====
Passing into the lands of Dunland, the Rangers investigate the loyalties of the local tribes of Dunlendings. Some are fiercely loyal to Saruman, other openly oppose him and many have not yet been convinced to do either. The Falcon-clan of Tur Morva village offers the Rangers shelter in exchange for their help against Saruman. The Rangers busy themselves with preparations for war while the player is sent to scout the rest of Dunland. Finding a surprise ally in Nona, who insists that she does not need Halbarad's permission to travel over her own land, the player and the Rangers come into first contact with the Rohirrim. Riders led by Grimbold hold the Fords of Isen against inevitable assault, while Théodred, son of King Théoden, leads a smaller scouting party into the lands of the Dunlendings, sworn enemies of Rohan for centuries. Returning to village of Tur Morva, the player finds a betrayal waiting for them: the clan decided that more is to be gained by siding with Saruman than by opposing him. The Grey Company is caught unprepared, many Rangers are killed and the rest captured.

The player and Ranger Lothrandir are sent directly to Isengard as a gift to Saruman. Separated from the Ranger, the player is sent working into the pits, observed by merciless Uruks. Using the dislike of Uruks for each other, the player fakes a total submission and is eventually allowed more freedom, as none believes them able to escape any longer. The player finds other prisoners, among them captured Rohirrim and Dunlendings - sworn enemies once, both find something in common after being made slaves to Saruman. Staging a diversion and freeing many prisoners at once, the player is able to sneak past confusion and escape Isengard.

Théodred offers the Rangers Saeradan and Radanir help in rescuing their captive friends and avenging the betrayal. The player and Rohirrim storm the village of traitors and rescue many prisoners, including Halbarad and the sons of Elrond. Yet they are still outnumbered - the leader of the traitorous clan gloats over Rangers' weaknesses and allows them to leave, telling them to spread the tale of how the Falcon-clan beat them. Of almost 60 named Rangers barely 30 made it out alive: Halbarad takes an oath to avenge the traitors and proclaims himself in eternal debt to Théodred, before planning the next move.

==== Book 5 - The Prince of Rohan ====
The secrecy required by Grey Company's errand and their weakened state following capture and imprisonment prevent them from continuing their journey for the time being. Finishing his scouting of Dunlending lands, Prince Théodred returns to the Fords of Isen and Halbarad bids the player to go with him, to repay the debt. Saying farewell to friends, the player arrives at Grimbold's encampment and joins the preparations for the upcoming battle. Théodred shares his plan: the Rohirrim are to journey north to Isengard and smash the vanguard of Saruman's forces, then retreat to the Ford, forcing the Wizard to delay his assault on Rohan and buy themselves valuable time.

At dawn, the Prince leaves a small company to guard the Ford and leads his Éored into battle, with Grimbold and the player at his side. They encounter the vanguard of the Uruks and quickly cut through their lines, but then reinforcements come out of Isengard and outflank the cavalry, nearly surrounding them. Théodred orders a retreat, covered by Grimbold and the player. Unknown to the Rohirrim, Saruman has already sent his main force to the Ford of Isen by the eastern bank of the river while the riders attacked from the west. The defenders of the Ford are caught between two forces and are surrounded on a small island amidst the river by the time Théodred returns. Grimbold and the player cut through the enemies, but as they reach Théodred, he is struck by a mighty Uruk. Reinforcements from Riddermark led by Elfhelm from Helm's Deep finally arrive and charge the attackers. The Uruks retreat to Isengard, while Elfhelm and Grimbold tend to the gravely wounded Prince, who orders to bury him at the Ford - to guard it until such time as Éomer comes. At nightfall, the Prince of the Riddermark passes away.

==== Book 6 - Mists of Anduin ====
Regrouping at Grimbold's encampment at night, the Rohirrim and the player take a rest after a long day of battle. The player experiences a strange lucid dream, seeing many friends and enemies, both living and already dead. An apparition of Lady Galadriel bids the player to come and visit her urgently, adding a request to "bring the ghost" at the end. "The Ghost" refers to the Dunlending girl Nona, who had dubbed herself "Wadu's Ghost" in memory of her late brother and began waging her own vendetta over the Dunlendings who sold themselves over to Saruman. The players tracks Nona in the Gap of Rohan and convinces her to undertake a journey to Lothlorien. While the Galadhrim border sentries are even more distrusting of an outsider from Dunland than usual, the two are granted an audience. Galadriel shocks the player by saying that the dream had nothing to do with her, when Gandalf the White enters the conversation, having barely missed the Fellowship as they departed down the Great River days earlier. The Wizard insists that the dream must have had meaning and bids the player to explore the shores of Anduin downstream. After passing through the Rohirrim border settlement of Stangard, the player and Nona arrive at the Brown Lands, where they find a new threat: a corpse of a fell beast, slain by an arrow fired by Legolas (as described in The Fellowship of the Ring), with its rider missing. On their way back to the Rohirrim town, the player and Nona are attacked by first a band of Easterlings and later the Nazgûl himself. Using the fire, the two manage to hold their ground, but Nona is wounded - and whether by an Easterling blade or a Morgul one is unclear. The Rohirrim are in no hurry to offer help to one of their old enemies, save for one man named Horn. With all haste Horn and the player take Nona back to Lady Galadriel, who heals the wound, leaving Nona out of danger. Later, Galadriel reveals to the player that she foresaw Nona's demise in her Mirror and that she was saved only by the player's actions.

== Free Updates ==
Like Shadows of Angmar, Mines of Moria and the Siege of Mirkwood, Turbine has continued to release regular game updates.

=== Update 5: Armies of Isengard ===
Update 5 was released on 12 December 2011. Some of the highlights include (complete release notes):

- A new cluster of four instances and a 12-man raid set inside the Ring of Isengard
- Continuation of the Epic Story in Volume 3 Book 5
- A newly implemented Instance finder allows players to form groups more efficiently
- Various barter currencies were streamlined and unified
- Changes to Reputation items allowing them to be consumed instantly

=== Update 6: Shores Of The Great River ===
Update 6 was released on 12 March 2012. Some of the highlights include (complete release notes):

- A new region: The Great River (Anduin), located to the south of Lothlorien
- A new 6 man instance set in a cavern underneath Fangorn Forest
- The next iteration of Instance Finder, with updated functionality
- Further tweaks to Warden, Rune-Keeper, and Minstrel classes
- Skirmish soldiers could be summoned to assist in combat on regular landscape
- Volume 3: Book 6 of the Epic story
- Changes to itemization and currencies in the Ettenmoors
- Upgrades to the Barter Wallet

=== Update 7: Shades Of The Past ===
Update 7 was released on 14 May 2012. Highlights include (initial notes):

- Revamping of the Western half of Moria (Durin's Way, The Great Delving, Silvertine Lodes, and Water Works)
- The revamp of the Fornost instance, now separated into 4 parts and scalable from level 40 upwards
- A new skirmish set in Dunland
