= The Lord of the Rings Online: Riders of Rohan =

2012 video game expansion

- Developer: Turbine, Inc.
- Publishers: Turbine, Inc.
- Engine: Turbine G3
- Platform: Microsoft Windows
- Release: NA: October 15, 2012
- Genre: MMORPG
- Mode: Multiplayer

The Lord of the Rings Online: Riders of Rohan is the fourth expansion for the Massively multiplayer online role-playing game The Lord of the Rings Online. It was released on October 15, 2012 as a web-based download and on Steam. New game enhancements include a level cap increase to 85, level 85 legendary weapons (as well as a new legendary item), and six new areas in Eastern Rohan.

The expansion's major new feature is Mounted Combat, which enables the players to perform skills on horsebacks. Mounted combat was initially only available in Rohan, but was also present in all subsequent regions, provided that the player is not within a settlement.

== Mounted Combat ==
=== War-Steeds ===
A new major gameplay feature added in the expansion is Mounted Combat. Early on, players have the opportunity to acquire a Rohirric War-steed. This mount is unique from all others in that it allows players to engage in combat while on horseback. To that end, the war-steeds have been given their own stats such as morale and power and their own skills. Players will also acquire new class-specific skills exclusive to mounted combat, as normal "on-foot" skills are not usable. Riders of Rohan also features mounted enemies, and players are encouraged to take advantage of the benefits of being on a war-steed when fighting these enemies.

Movement on war-steeds is not like movement on the travel mounts that have previously been featured in The Lord of the Rings Online. War-steeds accelerate slower, decelerate slower, and have a much wider turning radius than the smaller, northern horse breeds. In this manner, war-steeds behave more realistically than travel mounts. As a war-steed accelerates to its top speed, it accumulates a new feature called Fury. Fury amplifies the damage done to enemies as well as the healing done to allies. Because of this new feature, mounted combat is intended to be primarily similar to jousting, in which players ride a distance, gaining speed and Fury, and unleash a single, massive hit on the enemy. The player then rides off, gathers more speed and Fury, turns about, and rides at the enemy again until the victory or defeat.

All players will acquire the "Medium" War-steed, with a good balance of survivability, maneuverability, and damage potential. Players who have purchased the expansion are free to choose two alternatives, the Light and the Heavy War-steeds, while players who have not purchased the expansion can purchase these alternatives with Lotro Points. The Light War-steed is more maneuverable than its Medium and Heavy counterparts, but sacrifices survivability in exchange. The Heavy War-steed sacrifices some damage potential and some maneuverability for survivability.

=== War-steed traits and skills ===
In addition to the 3 War-Steed types, each type has three different trait-trees: Red Dawn, Riddermark, and Rohirrim. As the war-steed levels up, player receives points which can be spent in each trait-tree. As players spends points in one of the three trees, they will unlock passive bonuses and more mounted combat skills. In addition, more potent traits are unlocked as players spends points in a given tree. Each tree is different for every class, resulting in multiple configurations for players to choose from. Despite the class differences, Red Dawn focuses more on offense; Riddermark focuses on a balance of offense, maneuverability, and survival; and the Rohirrim trait-tree focuses on maneuverability and survival.

As traits-trees are filled out, Mount Skills become available. These skills directly affect how war-steeds behave (e.g., one skill causes a war-steed to automatically follow an enemy). In this manner, Mount Skills can be thought of as skills that the war-steeds themselves possess (although they are still found in the character Skills Panel). In addition to Mount Skills, each class will be granted separate Mounted Class Skills. The first 3 skills granted are stances that reflect what role the player is filling: Red Dawn, Riddermark, and Rohirrim. War-steed types, traits, and skills/stances are independent of each other, and each set of combinations will differ by class. This provides great variety of playstyles, allowing each player to find their own mix of damage and survivability.

== Other gameplay enhancements ==
The introduction of Mounted Combat also required significant changes to major aspects of the game, which can be grouped into Automatic Quest bestowal, Open Tapping and Remote Looting. At launch, all of these features have only been implemented in Rohan, but due to positive player feedback were expanded to the rest of the game world in an update later that year.

- Automatic Quest bestowal adjusted for the high speed of combat and movement in Rohan. Instead of having each Quest start and end at an NPC quest-giver, many quests will now be automatically given to players upon entering a certain area or encountering a specific enemy. These quests can likewise be completed instantly after finishing all objectives, receiving the rewards without the need to back-track to the nearest settlement often.
- Lord of the Rings Online previously employed a mechanism called "tapping," which was a way for the game to detect who attacked an enemy, with only the first player (or group) receiving loot, experience and quest progression. The main problem with this method was that it discouraged players from helping othersif they randomly stumble upon each other. With Riders of Rohan these penalties have been removed and every player who taps an enemy (or heals another player who has tapped an enemy) will get full experience and loot rewards when the enemy is defeated.
- Traditionally, after defeating an enemy, players must move to the corpse to retrieve any loot reward from it. Because combat in Rohan is intended to be on horseback, and because it is incredibly inconvenient to swing the war-steed around just to loot a corpse, Riders of Rohan introduced the concept of Remote Looting. Instead of having to travel back to a defeated enemy's corpse, loot rewards are automatically placed into the Remote Loot panel. An alert is then displayed to the player which, when clicked, will open the Remote Loot panel, which will hold a maximum of 50 items for 1 hour. If any subsequent items are added before 1 hour has expired, the oldest items will be purged first. Once the Remote Loot panel is opened, the player can opt to retrieve the loot or discard it.

=== Warbands ===
In the Shores of the Great River update to the Rise of Isengard expansion, the concept of nemesis-class enemies roaming the landscape was introduced. These enemies occupied a specific area in the Great River region, and were expected to be engaged in a group. Riders of Rohan extends this concept further by grouping these difficult enemies together with several, less-dangerous enemies and allowing these groups to roam all of Rohan. In most circumstances, these warbands are intended to be engaged by groups of players on horseback. Players can engage these warbands on foot, but suffer a severe disadvantage when doing so. Warbands frequently have mounted enemies as members, and they will frequently employ the same tactics that players will use when mounted.

== New zones ==
The Riders of Rohan expansion added the Eastemnet region, which covered the eastern part of Rohan and was sub-divided into six areas: The Wold, The East Wall, The Norcrofts, The Sutcrofts, The Entwash Vale, and The Eaves of Fangorn. Players begin their adventures in Rohan by traveling south of the Great River area to The Wold. As they continue their journey, they make their way through all the regions in the Eastemnet, ultimately reaching the level-85 area of The Sutcrofts.

== Storyline ==
=== Volume III: Allies of the King ===
Riders of Rohan continues the storyline that began shortly after The Lord of the Rings Online: Siege of Mirkwood expansion and continued in The Lord of the Rings Online: Rise of Isengard.

==== Book 7 - A Fellowship Endangered ====
Her wounds healed, the Dunlending girl Nona makes a full recovery and becomes eager to leave Lothlorien. Lady Galadriel's mirror reveals to her and the player that the Fellowship faced a grave danger at Parth Galen, but many things remain unclear. Galadriel bids the player and Nona to travel further down the river of Anduin to discover the Fellowship's fate, sending with them as a guide an Elf named Corudan, whose sister Sigileth fought alongside the player in Mirkwood and perished during the battle in Dol Guldur. The group makes a brief stop at the Rohirrim town of Stangard, where the player discovers that Horn, the man who helped carry wounded Nona into Lothlorien, is no longer welcomed by other men for venturing into the woods they consider haunted. His future uncertain, Horn accepts the offer to join the player's quest. Together with an Elf, a man of Rohan and a girl from Dunland, the player travels by boat south down Anduin, eventually reaching the Argonath. On the lawn of Parth Galen, they find signs of the Fellowship's passing amidst a struggle and are eventually able to piece together the events leading to the Breaking of the Fellowship. This goal accomplished, they decide to pursue the Three Hunters and aid them in rescuing Merry and Pippin from the Uruks who captured them.

==== Book 8 - Into the Riddermark ====
Already days behind Aragorn, Legolas and Gimli, the group has no hope of catching up with them on foot. They set to acquire War-Steeds from the friendly Rohirrim in the town of Langhold. While the Three Hunters led their pursuit on foot without stopping for rest, the player's company now has the benefit of the mounts, but makes several stops at Rohirrim towns along the way, to get a better direction of where the passing Uruks went. After departing the town of Faldham, where Elfhelm's son Elfmar rules in his father's absence at the Fords of Isen, they make their way to Eaworth in the Entwash Vale, near the edge of Fangorn Forest. Horn's father Ingbert is the Reeve (ruler) of this town and the Vale itself, but is not pleased to see his son: Horn had a term to serve in the town of Stangard, which he now broke. Adding more tension is the fact that Horn and Nona, despite their differences, have begun to show signs of affection for each other during the journey, but few in Eaworth are even able to tolerate the presence of a "wild Dunlending" among them. Offended by such welcome, Nona leaves silently and without saying goodbye. Unable to find her trail, the player, Corudan and Horn have no choice but to continue with their original mission.

==== Book 9 - The Third Marshall ====
Éomer and his riders make a stop at Eaworth while returning to Edoras. The Third Marshall says to the player the same thing he earlier said to Aragorn: that his riders have killed the Uruks and burned their bodies, with none left alive. The player and their two companions set out to investigate the site of the battle themselves. Lacking Aragorn's superior tracking skills, they miss the signs of the Hobbits having escaped and nearly succumb to despair. However, a chance encounter with an Ent from the Fangorn Forest reveals that not only are the Hobbits alive, but that Gandalf himself has already seen for their safety. Their hopes renewed, the player, Horn and Corudan the Elf decide to travel with Eomer's eored for a time.

Eomer's next stop takes him to the town of Snowbourn on the river of the same name. The Third Marshall deems the entire Eastemnet not defensible, with Isengard forces coming from the west, Mordor orcs pouring from the south and Easterlings crossing the river from the east. By his military power, he orders all people remaining in those lands to abandon their homes and move westward across the Entwash river, where they can be better defended. The Thane of Snowbourn Fastred openly defies this order, refusing to abandon his position and leading bold strikes against orc forces instead. Angered at the insubordination, Eomer decides to bring this matter directly to the attention of the King. The player and his companions accompany Eomer to Edoras, where the signs of Grima Wormtongue's growing influence become apparent to all after the King's Minstrel Gléowine is thrown out of the court for crossing him. The audience with King Theoden quickly turns into an interrogation by Wormtongue, who orders Eomer stripped of his rank and imprisoned for breaking the "King's" direct order not to pursue the Uruk-hai band. Only an intervention by Lady Eowyn saves the player, Corudan and Horn from similar fate - instead they are thrown out of Edoras and are ordered to remain in the Eastemnet, not to cross the Entwash river under the penalty of death.

==== Book 10 - Snows of Wildermore ====
The player, Horn and Corudan choose to follow Gléowine, King Théoden's minstrel and Horn's old mentor, who has been thrown out of Edoras along with them. They find him in Snowbourn, where they hear troubling news from Harding, Aldor of the Northmarch - no word has come from Wildermore, in remote corner of the Wold, for weeks. Gléowine joins the player's company as they travel to the Wold and then to Wildermore. The find the land engulfed in snow, highly unnatural for those lands, and terrorized by a stone giant named Nurzum. A foul product of Saruman experiments, he had his strength augmented with remains of an ancient Huorn, making him nigh invulnerable, and a relic of Morgoth from Thangorodrim fused to his back, causing unnatural cold, snow storms and ice to follow him whenever he goes. Widfara, one of Harding's men from the Wold, is a sole survivor of his attack, and believes everyone else, including Harding's son Leodwig, killed.

While traversing Wildermore in search of ways to oppose Nurzum, the player and his companions unexpectedly come across Nona. Since her departure in Eaworth, she made her way to the city of Byre Tor, which has been razed by Nurzum, and cared for the survivors, her hatred for Men of Rohan lessened by the kind actions. Her reunion with Horn is brief and cold, and not having yet resolved her feelings for him, she chooses to leave again. The others follow her to a cave where she hides survivors from the snow, among them Harding's son Leodwig, injured but alive. Seeing wrath of Nurzum firsthand, Corudan the Elf decides to search for aid among the Ents of the nearby Fangorn Forest. He and the player manage to find and wake the Ent Leaflock and relay to him Nuzum's story. The Ent cares little for troubles of Men, but defiling of Huorn's remains rouses him to anger and he commands Huorns of the forest to come after the giant. Nurzum fights off the attack, but is weakened and later defeated by the player and Heroes of Wildermore. Meanwhile, Nona and Horn resolve their feelings and finally commit to each other.

==== Interludes ====
A series of session plays running concurrent to Book 10 shows the Rangers of the Grey Company whom the player left in Book 5 and their activities in Dunland, without the player character's involvement.

Meanwhile, the Grey Company of Dunedain remains in Dunland, where following their rescue from imprisonment in Tur Morva, the Rangers drove the traitorous Falcon Clan underground. The Ranges occupy the city itself and fight off several smaller ambushes, but don't have the force to assault the Dunlendings in the tunnels under Methedras, which the Falcon Clan knows much better, resulting in a stalemate. The Sons of Elrond bid Halbarad to continue the journey south, yet many Rangers refuse to leave without having vengeance for their fallen brothers. The Ranger Saeradan, with Halbarad's permission, leaves the company and takes a wagon with the bodies of the fallen north, to prevent their defilement in the hostile lands. Upon reaching Enedwaith he makes an important discovery - the Oathbreakers of the Forsaken Road, responsible for an earlier attack on the Rangers, have left those lands and are travelling back to the Stone of Erech, hoping to be relieved of their eternal curse. In Tur Morva the Ranger Golodir refuses to wait for vengeance any longer and enters the caverns accompanied only by his friend Corunir. There they discover that the Falcon Clan has tricked them again and used the underground passages to cross the Misty Mountains into the lands of Rohan. In Isengard, the Ranger Lothrandir is still holding out against physical and mental abuse by Saruman's servants, but the Wizard has patience and is determined to break him.

== OS X client ==
Prior to Riders of Rohan, there was only a native game client for Microsoft Windows. Players who wished to play LOTRO on an Apple Macintosh had to use either Windows-emulation software, or use Apple's Bootcamp to install Windows on their computer. During the Riders of Rohan beta testing phase, Turbine released a native OS X client for testing. This OS X client was not released as part of the expansion, presumably due to its not quite being ready for production. The OS X client was released on November 1, 2012.

== Soundtrack ==
Critically acclaimed video-game composer Chance Thomas composed the soundtrack to the Riders of Rohan expansion, which was released as a separate album by WaterTower Music. In addition, soundtracks from previous Lord of the Rings Online releases Shadows of Angmar and Mines of Moria (to which Thomas also contributed tracks) were made available for separate purchase.

== Critical reception ==
Reception

Aggregate score
Aggregator	Score
Metacritic	88/100

Review score
Publication	Score
IGN	8.3/10

Riders of Rohan won the 2012 Best Expansion of E3 Award by Ten Ton Hammer. IGN gave the expansion an 8.3/10.
