= The Lord of the Rings: Tactics =

2005 video game

- Developer: Amaze Entertainment
- Publisher: Electronic Arts
- Platform: PlayStation Portable
- Release: NA: November 8, 2005; EU: December 2, 2005
- Genre: Tactical role-playing game
- Modes: Single-player, Multiplayer

The Lord of the Rings: Tactics is a tactical role-playing game for the Sony PlayStation Portable. It features characters from The Lord of the Rings by J. R. R. Tolkien. However, it is a direct adaptation of Peter Jackson's film adaptations, and has characters that resemble the films' depictions of them. Tactics was published by Electronic Arts. The game was released for the PlayStation Store on September 30, 2009.

== Gameplay ==
The gameplay takes place on a grid. The game's characters move at the same time, rather than manipulating each entity individually.

Another feature of the game is called the Zone of Control. The Zone of Control means that if the player's character is next to his opponent's square on the grid, they must stop and fight. By using the Zone of Control, combined with simultaneous movement, the player can trap an enemy unit.

The player eventually gets to control a handful of heroes who progressively get more powerful. These are combined with a number of warriors. The user may play as the Fellowship or the minions of Sauron.

== Reception ==
Reception

Aggregate scores
Aggregator	Score
GameRankings	65%
Metacritic	64/100

Review scores
Publication	Score
GameRevolution	3/10
GameSpot	6.5/10
GameSpy	3/5
GamesRadar+	4/5
GameZone	7.9/10
IGN	7.7/10
RPGFan	77/100

The Lord of the Rings: Tactics has received scores of 6.5 from GameSpot and 7.7 from IGN.
