= Chance Thomas =

American composer, author, and entrepreneur

- Born: October 7, 1961 (age 64); San Gabriel, California
- Occupations: Composer, author, entrepreneur
- Website: www.chancethomas.com

Chance Thomas is an American composer, author, and entrepreneur. As a composer, he creates original music for animation, video games, movies, television, and virtual reality. His music has received critical acclaim and commercial success, underscoring an Oscar, an Emmy, and billions of dollars in sales worldwide.

Chance is best known for scoring video games like DOTA 2, The Lord of the Rings Online and James Cameron’s Avatar. He also scored Columbia Pictures’ The ChubbChubbs!, which won an Academy Award for Best Animated Short Film, and the TV film Lost Treasure Hunt, which was nominated for two Daytime Emmy Awards.

Chance is the author of the university textbook Composing Music for Games: The Art, Technology and Business of Video Game Scoring. The book was released in 2016 by CRC Press, a Taylor and Francis Publishing imprint. As an entrepreneur, Chance founded HUGEsound in 1998 and sold it in 2016 to a large and diversified entertainment conglomerate, R Legacy Entertainment. He served as VP of Music and Creative Development for HUGEsound Post Production until its demise in late 2018.

His projects have won major awards, including an Oscar, Emmy, IGN, Telly, Aurora and several G.A.N.G. awards. He is considered the father of game music Grammy eligibility and was honored in 2013 with the Game Audio Network Guild's Recognition Award.

== Early life ==
Throughout high school, Thomas formed and played in progressive rock bands until he was called to serve a mission in northern Italy for the LDS Church. When he returned home in 1982, he met his bride-to-be, Pamela, at a single's ward family home evening. Thomas worked at UPS, putting his music on hold while pursuing a business degree at Central Oklahoma State University. While in rehab due to a torn shoulder, a friend informed him of a job as an entertainer at a pizza restaurant. Thomas got the job, which paid more than UPS. After two and a half years in Oklahoma, he received a transfer scholarship to finish his business degree at Brigham Young University in Utah. Shortly after his transfer, he switched his scholarship to the music school and eventually graduated with a bachelor's degree in music.

== Career ==
Chance Thomas began his professional career as a performer, singing and playing piano as well as keyboard at ski resorts in the Rocky Mountains and on cruise ships in the Caribbean. In 1991, he opened a small music production company and studio in Salt Lake City, Utah, called byChance Productions and began creating music for ad agencies and corporate clients. He made several orchestral scores for public service announcements produced by non-profits like The Salvation Army, The Church of Jesus Christ of Latter-day Saints, and The United Way.

He emerged into the video game industry in 1996. At the time, Sierra Online was looking for a full-time composer, and Chance moved back to California to take the job. This opportunity allowed him to write music for Quest for Glory V: Dragon Fire, creating one of the first orchestral video game scores in history. In the late 1990s, Chance led a successful movement which brought game music into the Grammy Awards. The Quest for Glory soundtrack was a factor in the Academy creating three new categories — Best Score, Best Song and Best Soundtrack for Film, Television and Other Visual Media.

Chance was also an innovator in video games. He led the design and implementation of one of the world's first successful adaptive music systems based on digital audio streams (1997). He also pioneered new techniques for composing game music, including ambient set matrices (1996) and interactive scoring maps (2001). When Sierra Online closed the doors of its California studio in 1998, Chance opened HUGEsound, located just outside Yosemite National Park. Projects scored during that time included the Oscar-winning film, The ChubbChubbs!, and games like Peter Jackson’s King Kong, Marvel Ultimate Alliance, and Lord of the Rings Online.

In 2007, Chance relocated HUGEsound to Utah and continued to compose for high-profile game titles like Avatar: the Game, Heroes of Might and Magic, and DOTA 2.

== Lord Of The Rings Online ==
Chance Thomas' Lord of the Rings Online (LOTRO) scores are among his most acclaimed and documented work so far. He based the instrumental palettes, vocal ranges, stylistic tendencies and emotional conjuring of many pieces on direct references/inferences scattered throughout the text. On June 16, 2017, Thomas released The Lord of the Rings Online: 10th Anniversary Commemorative Soundtrack through HUGEsound Records. The album contains tracks from 2007 to 2017.

== HUGEsound ==
In 1998, Chance launched HUGEsound in Oakhurst, California as a full-service audio development company to service clients in film and gaming. HUGEsound provided sound design, foley, original music scoring and song production for The ChubbChubbs!, among other projects, for nearly 20 years. In September 2016, Chance sold HUGEsound to R Legacy Entertainment, a privately held umbrella corporation containing a diversified portfolio of entertainment companies in Nashville, Los Angeles, and Salt Lake City.

In February 2017, HUGEsound Post Production was opened as a 16,000 square foot recording and production facility. It offered a variety of post-production services in picture, music, and sound.

== Volunteer work ==
Chance has served in volunteer capacities for community councils, universities, churches, food banks and industry organizations throughout his career. In 1994, he launched the annual Wasatch Front Frozen Turkey Hunt for the Utah Food Bank. In 1998, he helped organize the Music and Sound award review committees for the Academy of Interactive Arts and Sciences and led those committees for 2 years. In 2002, he helped found the Game Audio Network Guild and served on its board of directors for 15 years. In 2007, he joined the Advisory Board for the Game Developers Conference (GDC). He has served on Advisory Boards for the Musicians Institute, Brigham Young University and Full Sail University.

== Public speaking ==
Chance speaks regularly at universities, colleges and professional conferences on the art, craft, tech, and business of music scoring. He has spoken at the University of Southern California, University of Michigan, San Francisco Conservatory of Music, Cincinnati Conservatory of Music, Oklahoma City University, Berklee College of Music, Full Sail University, Musicians Institute, VRDC, FMX Animation Conference, GameSoundCon and the Game Developers Conference, among many others. Chance won the Ace of Spades Award from GDC in 2010, given to the speaker with the highest rated talk of the entire conference.

== Composing Music for Games ==
In 2016 CRC Press released Chance's textbook, Composing Music for Games: The Art, Technology and Business of Video Game Scoring. The text is a guidebook for launching and maintaining a career as a video game composer. The book includes sections about scoring principles, specific styles for video game music, and several project assignments and simulations.

== Discography ==
The lists below show some of Thomas' most notable work in various scoring categories:

=== Video games ===
Year	Title	Company
1996	The Realm	Sierra
1998	Quest For Glory V: Dragon Fire	Sierra
1998	Police Quest: SWAT 2	Sierra
2002	Earth & Beyond	EA Games
2002	The Lord Of The Rings: The Two Towers	EA Games
2002	The Lord of the Rings: The Fellowship of the Ring (Trailer)	Sierra
2002	Warcraft III: Reign Of Chaos (Trailer)	Blizzard
2003	The Hobbit	Sierra
2003	The Lord of the Rings: War of the Ring	Vivendi Universal Games
2003	Unreal II: The Awakening	Legend Entertainment
2005	Peter Jackson's King Kong	Ubisoft
2006	Paraworld (Trailer)	SEK
2006	Left Behind: Eternal Forces	Left Behind Games
2006	X-Men: The Official Game	Activision
2006	Marvel: Ultimate Alliance	Activision
2006	Dungeons & Dragons Online	Turbine
2007	The Lord Of The Rings Online: Shadows Of Angmar	Warner Bros.
2008	Left Behind: Tribulation Forces	Left Behind Games
2008	The Lord Of The Rings Online: Mines Of Moria	Warner Bros.
2008	Nerf-N-Strike	EA Games
2008	Littlest Pet Shop (Series)	EA Games
2009	Nerf-N-Strike Elite	EA Games
2009	Champions Online	Atari
2009	James Cameron's Avatar	Ubisoft
2010	Left Behind 3: Rise of the Antichrist	Left Behind Games
2010	Monopoly Streets	EA Games
2011	Lego Star Wars III: The Clone Wars	LucasArts
2011	Combat Of Giants: Dinosaurs 3D	Ubisoft
2012	Cytus	Rayark Games
2012	The Lord of the Rings Online: Riders of Rohan	Warner Brothers Interactive
2012	Dungeons and Dragons Online: Menace of the Underdark	Warner Brothers Interactive
2014	Dota 2 TI4 Battle Pass	Valve
2014	Valiant Hearts: The Great War	Ubisoft
2014	Might & Magic Duel Of Champions: Forgotten Wars	Ubisoft
2015	FIVE: Guardians of David	Kingdom Games LLC
2017	Faeria	Abrakam Entertainment
2017	The Lord of the Rings Online: Mordor	Standing Stone Games
2018	DOTA 2 TI8 Battle Pass	Valve
2019	Warhammer: Chaosbane	Bigben Interactive
2021	Roguebook	Nacon
2023	The Settlers: New Allies	Ubisoft

=== Television ===
Year	Title	Company
2003	The Bachelorette	ABC
2006	Hometown Heroes	PBS
2009	Pawn Stars	History Channel; Lifetime
2010	Swamp Men	National Geographic Wild
2013	Nathan For You	Hulu
2014	Lost Treasure Hunt	American Public Television

=== Film ===
Year	Title	Company
1993	Rigoletto	Feature Films For Families
2002	The ChubbChubbs!	Columbia Pictures
2007	Inspire: The Chicago Spire Art Film	Imageworks
2013	The Life Of Christ	LDS Films
2016	Driven In Detroit	LDS Films
2013	The Reason Behind Christmas	LDS Films
2017	Tales of a Time Traveler	Evans and Sutherland

=== Virtual reality ===
Year	Title	Company
2017	Curse Of The Serpent's Eye	The VOID
