= The Lord of the Rings Online =

- Box art of the game's physical release
- Developers: Turbine, Codemasters, Midway Games, Standing Stone Games (Note: The game was formerly developed by Turbine.)
- Publisher: Daybreak Game Company (Note: The game was formerly published by Turbine, Midway Games, Codemasters in Europe, and Warner Bros. Interactive Entertainment.)
- Platforms: Microsoft Windows; OS X (deprecated)
- Release: April 24, 2007
- Genre: Massively multiplayer online role-playing game
- Mode: Multiplayer

The Lord of the Rings Online (LOTRO) is a 2007 massively multiplayer online role-playing game (MMORPG) for Microsoft Windows and previously for OS X, set in J. R. R. Tolkien's Middle-earth, taking place during the time period of The Lord of the Rings. Originally developed by Turbine, the game launched in North America, Australia, Japan, and Europe in April 2007 as The Lord of the Rings Online: Shadows of Angmar. Players could create characters of four races and seven classes and adventure throughout the region of Eriador. In November 2008, the Mines of Moria expansion was released, adding the region of Moria and two new playable classes. It was followed by the Siege of Mirkwood in December 2009. In 2010, the game underwent a shift from its original subscription-based payment model to being free-to-play.

The game saw continued development, alternating between paid expansions and free updates, which added new content in the regions of Isengard, Rohan and Gondor. In late 2016 the publishing of the game was transferred from Warner Bros. Interactive Entertainment to Daybreak Game Company, with development being taken over by Standing Stone Games, made up of former Turbine staff. The game development continued and in 2017 the Mordor expansion was released, bringing the main storyline to a close. The game then shifted to portraying the aftermath of the downfall of Sauron as well as telling the "Tales of Yore" which chronologically precede the main story, with further expansions in Minas Morgul, Gundabad, and Umbar.

== Gameplay ==
Similar to other MMORPGs, players control a character avatar within the gameworld, interact with objects, NPCs and other players. Characters gain levels by earning experience points, acquiring both new skills and trait points, which can be assigned in various configurations to customize personal playstyle. Players traverse the game world either on foot, using personal mounts or via instantaneous travel options. Players improve their characters by upgrading their equipment and can customize their look with the Cosmetic System, which can display armour and weapons other than those used for combat effectiveness. Characters also earn Reputation with various factions in the world, completing progressive tiers which unlock various rewards, from cosmetic pets and outfits to superior quality weapons and armour.

The crafting system allows each character to master up to four professions, which are separated into gathering of raw materials and actual crafting of usable items. Per the characterization of Hobbits in Tolkien's writings, significant emphasis is placed on cooking and agricultural farming. Characters have a Wallet for various currencies, with gold, silver and copper coins earned from most game activities and used for various common purchases. Many world regions, group instances and seasonal festivals feature their own unique currencies, which can neither be earned nor spent outside them. The in-game store uses LOTRO points, which can be both purchased with real money and earned in-game. Players can own personal houses, which can be decorated and provide access to facilities and additional storage space. Four themed neighbourhoods that are free for all are located in the original starter zones for Men, Dwarves, Elves and Hobbits. More neighbourhoods with larger houses and more decorating options are purchased via microtransaction and located in Gondor, Rohan, Erebor and Rivendell.

Subsequent updates and expansions introduced other systems to the game. Mines of Moria added Legendary items, intended to stay with the player throughout the game as opposed to being constantly replaced with better options. Each characters has one class-specific legendary weapon and one supplementary item, which increase in power alongside the character's level and can be enhanced with additional modifiers that affect the character's stats or skill behaviour. Riders of Rohan introduced mounted combat, with new rohirric war-steeds that allow players to execute attacks and other skills while on horseback. War-steeds have stats like those of player characters and can be customized by selecting different types of war-steeds, investing in different trait lines and switching between different mounted stances. Players can customize the look of their war-steeds by mix-and-matching various appearance traits. Gondor introduced essence gear with empty slots that can be enhanced with desired stats, allowing players to further customize armour to their playstyle.

=== Classes and races ===
Lord of the Rings Online launched with four playable races: Dwarves, Elves, Hobbits and Men. New races added post-launch were Beornings in 2014 (although only for the new class of the same name), High Elves in 2017, "Stout-Axe" Dwarves in 2019 (allowing players to choose the gender unlike the original Dwarven race which only allows male characters), and River-Hobbits (Smeagol's folk) in 2023.

The original seven character classes in the game are Burglar, Captain, Champion, Guardian, Hunter, Lore-master and Minstrel. Mines of Moria added two more classes: Rune-Keeper and Warden. A Beorning class was added in a regular update in November 2014, followed by the Brawler in 2021 Fate of Gundabad expansion and Mariner in 2023 Corsairs of Umbar expansion. All classes can further specialize in one of three trait lines that further determine their skills and combat role. In addition to Class traits, Racial and Virtue traits can also be allocated to further modify class performance.

=== Group Instances ===
Players can form groups of up to six characters in "fellowships", which can be further combined into "raids" of up to four fellowships. Fellowships are required to complete various group instances, which come in several distinct variations. A typical "instance" alternates between groups of strong enemies and boss encounters with special mechanics that provide a chest of rewards upon defeat. "Raids" are similar to instances but feature "raid locks", allowing progress of a difficult raid to be tracked across multiple game sessions. "Skirmishes" introduced with the Siege of Mirkwood expansion feature both enemy groups of random composition and randomized "Skirmish Lieutenant" encounters across the instance. "Epic Battles" introduced with the Helm's Deep expansion represent large-scale battles, in which friendly NPCs engage the enemy alongside the player characters, whose focus lies on supporting their allies and completing specific objectives as opposed to simply defeating all enemies. Many group instances can be played on different group sizes, levels and tiers of difficulty for progressively higher rewards.

World Expansion Timeline
Year	Regions Added
2007	Ered Luin · Shire · Bree-land · Lone-lands · North Downs · Trollshaws · Misty Mountains · Angmar · Evendim
2008	Forochel · Eregion · Moria · Lothlórien
2009	Southern Mirkwood (Dol Guldur)
2010	Enedwaith
2011	Dunland · Gap of Rohan · Isengard
2012	Great River · East Rohan
2013	West Rohan
2014	Fangorn Forest · Paths of the Dead · Gondor (Dol Amroth to Pelargir) · Dead Marshes
2015	Gondor (Pelargir to Osgiliath) · South Ithilien
2016	Druadan Forest · North Ithilien
2017	Dagorlad · Mordor (Plateau of Gorgoroth)
2018	Northern Mirkwood · Iron Hills · Ered Mithrin
2019	Vales of Anduin · Minas Morgul
2020	Wells of Anduin · Elderslade
2021	Wildwood of Bree-land · Gundabad
2022	Angle of Mitheithel · Swanfleet · Cardolan
2023	Anfalas · Pinnath Gelin · Cape of Umbar
2024	Valley of River Ikorban (Northern Near Harad)
2025	Ridge of Mûr Ghala (Southern Near Harad)

=== Game World ===
The game is set in J. R. R. Tolkien's Middle-earth based on The Lord of the Rings and The Hobbit, its license does not cover rights to any other works in Tolkien's legendarium, such as The Silmarillion. The game features a day–night cycle and various atmospheric and weather effects, which differ from day to day. The world is divided into five landmasses of Eriador, Rhovanion, Gondor, Mordor, and Haradwaith. Each landmass is then divided further into distinct "Regions", which are then further sub-divided into "Areas". Each region contains NPCs and quests intended for a certain character level range, with the main Epic storyline serving as a guide between the areas of a region and regions of the world in the intended order. Each Region is "fixed" at a specific time period during the War of the Ring despite the passage of time in the main story; because of this, characters such as Gandalf or Aragorn can appear at multiple places simultaneously if those places are set during different portions of the story. Some locations are permanently accessible in more than one state: for example, players can freely move from Isengard flooded by the Ents to Isengard at the height of Saruman's power, and from Minas Tirith's rebuilding after the battle of the Pelennor Fields to Minas Tirith before the battle, with the enemy still beyond the walls.

=== Player vs Monster Player ===
Classic PvP combat found in many other games does not exist in The Lord of the Rings Online. Instead, Player vs Monster Player (also known as PvMP or Monster Player) allows players to create "Monster player" characters and engage Free People in combat in special secluded areas.

Monster player classes are Orc Reaver, Orc Defiler, Spider Weaver, Uruk Blackarrow, Uruk Warleader and Warg Stalker. Monster player characters are fixed in level and advance by gaining Infamy Ranks for killing Free People characters instead. Monster players can not equip items, but can use consumable buffs and can be customized with various appearance traits. They can form a groups or "Warbands" but are unable to leave the confines of the PvMP area. Originally, the only PvMP area was the Ettenmoors, where Free Players could travel and battle Monster players for control over the five keeps and minor outposts. In July 2015, a second PvMP area was added in the ruins of Osgiliath, though it was disabled in 2021.

== Plot ==
The main or "Epic" storyline is told across "Volumes", which are released in "Books" consisting of a series of quests called "Chapters".

=== Volume I: Shadows of Angmar ===
The first Epic Volume starts shortly after Frodo and his friends have left the Shire. The player arrive at Bree, where they become acquainted with Aragorn and Gandalf and get involved in the larger affairs of Middle-Earth. After initially following in the footsteps of Aragorn and the Hobbits to Weathertop and the Trollshaws, the player soon gets involved into a campaign against the resurgent Kingdom of Angmar. Mordirith, Steward of The Witch-king of Angmar, is driven away from Carn Dûm, prompting Sauron's other servants - Amarthiel and Mordrambor - to vie for his position. Amarthiel, a former elf-smith of Eregion, once wielded a minor Ring of Power of her own, which she finds and reclaims despite the player's efforts. Mordrambor betrays Amarthiel to Mordirith and kills her father Laerdan to mock her. However the grief allows Narmeleth, Amarthiel's original personality to resurface. To avenge her father, Narmeleth leads the player into the fortress of the enemy by secret ways, killing Mordrambor and destroying the Ring that controlled her along the way. She drives Mordirith away once again at the cost of her life, her redemption earning her peace in the Undying Lands.

=== Volume II: Mines of Moria ===
Under orders of King Dain Ironfoot, the Iron Garrison of dwarves from Erebor is sent to investigate and potentially reclaim Moria. By sheer luck, they arrive mere days after Gandalf had defeated Durin's Bane and thrown the denizens of Moria into disarray. Using the power vacuum in the wake of the Balrog's demise, the dwarves quickly claim major ground and establish several footholds within Khazad-dûm, but their fortunes start to turn as the evil in Moria begins to unite under new leadership. Making an alliance with the Elves of Lothlorien, the dwarves attempt to hold their ground, but an emissary of Sauron arrives from Dol Guldur to put an end to their expedition. This story concludes in the Siege of Mirkwood expansion, where the Galadhrim launch a major assault against Dol Guldur in an effort to draw the Eye of the enemy away from the Fellowship as it departs from Lorien.

=== Volume III: Allies of the King ===
The player joins the Grey Company led by Halbarad and the Sons of Elrond that rides south to the aid Aragorn in Rohan. The Rangers of the North encounter several perils, first losing several men in Enedwaith, and then suffering a major betrayal in Dunland. Saruman's forces block the company's passage across the Fords of Isen, and as the Rangers recuperate, Lady Galadriel summons the player to Lorien, and urges them to follow the Fellowship down the river Anduin. Accompanied by a woman from Dunland, an elf from Lorien and a man from Rohan, the player tracks the Fellowship to the Falls of Rauros. They then follow the Three Hunters into the land of Rohan, where they become involved in the affairs of the local rulers. The player fights in the battle of Helm's Deep, after which they accompany King Théoden to confront Saruman at Orthanc, where the Rangers of the North finally meet with Aragorn.

=== Volume IV: The Strength of Sauron ===
After the Grey Company follows into the Paths of the Dead, the player follows them and arrives in Gondor, now besieged by the Corsairs of Umbar. After making a stop at Dol Amroth, the player catches up with Aragorn's forces and takes part in the Battle of Pelargir. After, Aragorn bids them find either Faramir or Gandalf in Minas Tirith, while his men sail up Anduin aboard the Corsair ships. Unable to pass through the enemy blockade at Harlond, the player takes a detour through Ithilien, and eventually reaches the besieged Osgiliath. They narrowly escape with the remaining Ithilien Rangers and reach the White City just as Faramir is shot by a Morgul dart and rendered unconscious. The player assists Gandalf in preparing the city for a siege, and just before the city gates are shut, is sent by the wizard to find King Théoden's forces. The player reunites with the Riders of Rohan in the Drúedain forest, and fights in the battle of the Pelennor Fields. They then join the assembled Host of the West that marches through North Ithilien into Dagorlad and fights at the Battle of the Black Gates, from where they see the One Ring destroyed and the forces of Sauron finally defeated.

=== The Black Book of Mordor: Where the Shadows Lie ===
The Free Peoples of Middle-Earth begin to explore the lands of Mordor which were closed to them for over a thousand years. Assisting Gandalf, the player learns of the Gúrzyul – powerful servants of the Enemy which, unlike the Nazgûl, did not perish with him, and continue to pose a danger to the people of Middle-Earth. One of the Gúrzyul, Karazgar the Weeping Warrior, has been suspiciously absent from the power struggle in Mordor, having escaped into the northern lands. The player and Gandalf give chase through the ruins of Dol Guldur, into the halls of King Thranduil, and eventually to the Kingdom Under the Mountain, now ruled by Dain's son, Thorin III. On an errand for Thorin III in the Iron Hills, the player finds an artifact from Mordor, a Black Book which they deliver to Gandalf for safekeeping. Karazgar's forces assault Erebor but are repelled, and a company of dwarves departs to reclaim their ancient strongholds in Ered Mithrin, believing them to be safe after the demise of Sauron. They battle against Karazgar until Gandalf reveals his weakness and learns that Karazgar desires the very book that Gandalf carries. Gandalf departs to the lands of Beornings to get the Black Book away from Karazgar. An encounter in the Gladden Fields sends Gandalf and the player back to Mordor, just as the forces of Gondor advance on Minas Morgul. The player joins Faramir's White Company and, with the help of Gandalf and the Rangers, manages to defeat Gothmog, Lieutenant of Morgul and second-in-command to the Witch-king of Angmar.

=== The Legacy of Durin and the Trials of the Dwarves ===
Emboldened by the success in the Grey Mountains, Prince Durin, son of King Thorin III, wishes to reclaim the ancestral dwarven stronghold of Gundabad. His Longbeards are joined by a host of dwarves from another clan of the East, who also lay claim upon the Mountain-Home. Bolstered by reinforcements from Erebor and the Iron Garrison recently driven from Moria, the dwarves clash with the Orcs of Gundabad in front of ancestral peaks. They achieve a minor victory, only to learn that Orcs are not their biggest problem: Gundabad has been claimed by a Frost-Dragon, her brood of drakes and their Hobgoblin servants. The host of dwarves make their way inside the mountain where they find the remaining survivors of Angmar involved in the conflict as well. Deep beneath Gundabad, Durin has an experience which causes him to remember his past lives and recognize himself as Durin the Seventh, the forefather of the dwarves returned. His ancient knowledge of Gundabad and its enemies allows the dwarves to gain an upper hand by pitting their opponents against one another. The Angmarim ally with Hobgoblins against the Orcs only to be betrayed by their master, while the death of the Son of Bolg throws the orcs and goblins into disarray. Eventually the dragon herself is defeated, allowing the dwarves to reclaim their ancient home and settle their differences for the common cause.

=== The Song of Waves and Wind ===
King Elessar travels the kingdom of Gondor with Queen Arwen to heal the scars of the War of the Ring while multiple factions battle for control of Umbar, across the Bay of Belfalas. These factions, including the Kindred of the Coins, the Heirs of Castamir and the Church of the All-seeing, threaten the newly won peace.

== Development and release ==
=== Pre-launch ===
Sierra On-Line announced the development of a licensed Middle-earth MMORPG in 1998. Sierra had financial troubles in 1999 and replaced the staff working on the game. Sierra continued to confirm development of the MMORPG but did not release any development details. Vivendi Universal Games, the parent company of Sierra, secured eight-year rights to produce computer and video games based on The Lord of the Rings books in 2001. Vivendi announced an agreement with Turbine in 2003 to produce Middle-earth Online, at that time expected to be released in 2004. In March 2005, Turbine announced that it had bought the rights to make a MMORPG based on Tolkien's literature and that Turbine would publish The Lord of the Rings Online instead of Vivendi. In February 2006, it was announced that Midway Games would co-publish the game with Turbine. A closed beta was announced on September 8, 2006. An open beta began on March 30, 2007, and was open to all who pre-ordered the game's Founders Club edition. On April 6, 2007, the beta opened to the public.

In April 2007, Salon.com reported that the game had dropped a planned feature for in-game player marriage because of the controversy around the possibility of same-sex and inter-species weddings. One developer stated that the design rule was for weddings to be allowed if examples could be found in the book, as between elves and humans. An online magazine for gay gamers, GayGamer.net, commented that while Tolkien was a devout Christian, his stance on gay rights remains unknown as the topic was not a public issue at the time. Video game critic Ian Bogost compared it to the case of The Sims 2, which did allow same-sex marriage three years prior.

=== Post-launch ===
On April 26, 2011, it was announced that Codemasters would relinquish control of the European service back to Turbine, and on June 1, the servers were transferred. After a transition period of a few days, they reopened under a unified The Lord of the Rings Online global service. On June 6, 2012, The Lord of the Rings Online was made available for download on Steam. On November 1, 2012, a beta of the OS X version was released In January 2014 it was announced that the license for The Lord of the Rings Online had been renewed between Turbine and Middle-earth Enterprises to 2017. Executive producer Aaron Campbell transferred to other duties in 2015, and was replaced by Dungeons and Dragons Online franchise director Athena Peters. 2015 also saw a major game worlds consolidation, with 29 active servers reduced to 10.

On December 19, 2016, it was announced that Turbine would no longer develop the game; rather, a new independent game studio was formed under the name Standing Stone Games, to be staffed by the people that had been working on The Lord of the Rings Online and Dungeons & Dragons Online under Turbine before. The publishing of the game would transfer from Warner Brothers to Daybreak Game Company. While a reason was not given for the transition, it was assured that the game would continue with new development. The 64-bit game client was added in June 2019, with the end of life for the 32-bit client scheduled for January 1, 2023. On August 25, 2022, OS X support was deprecated. 2025 saw another game worlds consolidation, with all existing 32-bit servers closing on August 31 and six new 64-bit servers that could support higher population launching in their place.

=== Subscription and Content Access model ===
In North America, players who pre-ordered the game were offered a special founder's offer, a lifetime subscription for $199 or reduced cost of $9.99 per month. The standard monthly fee is $14.99 with three-, six-, and twelve-month renewal discounts. Lifetime discounts are similarly available. European players had a similar program from Codemasters. A holiday subscription was available in December 2007 and January 2008 for $9.99/month for a three-month commitment. A special edition, which cost $10 more than the regular edition, included a full-color manual, an item called "Glass of Aglaral", a cloak of regeneration, which is visually different from the one in the regular edition, a "Making of" DVD, a soundtrack, and a ten-day buddy key. The one-year anniversary edition included a $9.99/month subscription or a $199.99 Lifetime subscription, which was again offered during the lead-up to the release of Mines of Moria. However, the lifetime subscription option is no longer available and is unlikely to return.

On June 4, 2010, it was announced the game was to add a free-to-play option in the autumn, with an in-game store. Free-to-play was launched in North America on September 10, 2010. After a delay in Europe, free-to-play went live on November 2, 2010. During the following six months the company reported tripled revenues from the title. In 2022, to celebrate the game's 15th anniversary, all expansions and quest packs up to and including the Helm's Deep expansion were made permanently free to all players. In addition, all paying subscribers were given access to Standard Editions of the game's Mordor, Minas Morgul, and War of Three Peaks expansions for the duration of their subscription.

=== Soundtrack ===
The game features a variety of original music, with most regions and instances containing a selection of specific themes, most of which were composed by either acclaimed video game composer Chance Thomas or in-house composers including Stephen Digregorio, Geoff Scott, Brad Spears, Egan Budd, Matt Harwood and Bill Champagne. According to Thomas, all references that were made to the music of the peoples of Middle-earth in the books were used to extrapolate as much information as possible about the instruments and styles that each race would have used to create their music. This information was then used as the basis for creating the score. In the first two years of the game Thomas and DiGregorio each contributed roughly half of all music, which was released as a soundtrack CD available with the Special Edition of 2007's "Shadows of Angmar" or pre-order of 2008's Mines of Moria expansion, in addition to 61 songs that were made available for free in mp3 format using a download manager released by Turbine. Their collaboration continued on the Mines of Moria soundtrack, released as a CD with the Collector's Edition of the expansion.

Neither Siege of Mirkwood nor Rise of Isengard expansions received a dedicated soundtrack release, with no music added to the game between 2009 and 2012 made officially available until the Riders of Rohan expansion, for which Chance Thomas returned to work on LOTRO after years of absence, releasing a soundtrack available both on CD and as a digital download. Music for the next year's Helm's Deep expansion was entirely composed by Stephen DiGregorio and was released as an album on SoundCloud while music added between 2013 and 2017 was likewise not covered by any official releases. In 2017 Chance Thomas returned once more to contribute music to the game, releasing a soundtrack album for the Mordor expansion in addition to a commemorative 10th Anniversary Soundtrack, which covered a collection of his work for the game from all previous soundtracks. After Mordor all music so far has been composed by Bill Champagne, with full soundtracks for free updates and expansions alike released on the game's YouTube channel. The soundtrack for The Lord of the Rings Online has received much praise for its quality and variety.

In keeping with Tolkien's heavy use of song and music in his books, The Lord of the Rings Online has a player music sub-system akin to MIDI that has been the subject of a Harvard anthropological study. Characters on reaching level 5 can learn to play musical instruments, including Bagpipes, Clarinet, Cowbell, Drum, Harp, Horn, Lute, Pibgorn, and Theorbo. Using keyboard macros, instruments can be played in real time on three octaves and abc notation, with the music broadcast to nearby player characters. Players can also play pre-programmed pieces from user-created .ABC script files using the game's music notation, similar to MIDI files. Players often hold impromptu public performances, in solo or as bands at places such as The Prancing Pony Inn in Bree. Communities also regularly organize music events and mini-concerts such as "Weatherstock": Woodstock above the Weathertop. The sub-system has been described as "one of the most elaborate player-music systems in any MMORPG to date."

== Reception ==
Reception

Aggregate score
Aggregator	Score
Metacritic	86/100

Review scores
Publication	Score
1Up.com	A
Eurogamer	9/10
Game Informer	8.5/10
GameSpot	8.3/10
GameSpy	4.5/5
IGN	8.6/10

The Lord of the Rings Online received "generally favorable" reviews, according to review aggregator Metacritic.

GameDaily awarded the game 9/10, praising its rich, fantasy-themed universe, well-integrated trait and title system, and a story that remains true to the works of Tolkien. Yahoo! Video Games wrote a review with few negative mentions, awarding the game a score of 4/5, while Computer and Video Games called the game an essential purchase for Lord of the Rings fans, scoring the game a 9.2/10. Eurogamer scored the game a 9.0/10, calling it tough to resist. GameSpy gave it 4.5/5 stars, claiming the game "opened up Middle-Earth to the masses" but commented negatively on its weak PvP content, while GameTrailers awarded it 8.5/10, citing its interesting tweaks to the MMO genre. IGN ranked it a similar 8.6/10, praising it for its solid experience, though criticizing it for its lack of major improvements to the genre. The New York Times called the game "a major achievement of interactive storytelling, the first game truly worthy of the 'Lord of the Rings' franchise and a must-play for just about anyone with an interest in Tolkien or the future of online entertainment." In a GameSpot review, the product was awarded an 8.3/10, praising its appealing polish and intriguing Monster Play feature. GamePro's review gave it an overall 4.25/5, pointing out how engaging the epic quests are, as well as how faithful to the novels the game managed to stay.

GameSpy declared The Lord of the Rings Online 'Game of the Month' for May 2007. Midway announced that the game sold over 172,000 copies in North America during its second quarter.

In August 2007, Codemasters announced that The Lord of the Rings Online had received five Golden Joystick Awards nominations for the five applicable categories for the game, and in October 2007 that it had won the "PC Game of the Year" at these awards. It won the same award again in October 2008.

In 2007, GameSpy awarded The Lord of the Rings Online 6th place in the top ten PC games of the year. Turbine also won the GameSpy MMO of the Year award.

During the 11th Annual Interactive Achievement Awards, The Lord of the Rings Online received a nomination for "Massively Multiplayer Game of the Year" by the Academy of Interactive Arts & Sciences.

In 2010, RPGFan's Adam Tingle named The Lord of the Rings Online the best MMORPG of all time in a top-10 countdown while RPGLand gave its "Best Free-to-Play MMORPG" annual award. That year, the NPD Group reported that the game was "the third most played massively multiplayer role-playing game" with Turbine citing their free-to-play model as the reason for the growing subscriber base.

In January 2011, PC Gamer chose The Lord of the Rings Online as the MMO of the year. Praise was given for treating fans to two new Epic Books' worth of quests, two added regions, expansion of in-game events, improved UI elements, and the revamp of the character creation and starter regions. Also noted was the success of the move to free-to-play, stating that The Lord of the Rings Online is "quickly redefining the way a successful subscriptionless MMO is run."

In both 2018 and 2019, gaming blog Massively (formerly known as Joystiq) rated The Lord of the Rings Online as Most Underrated MMORPG of the year for its expansions and updates, vast, diverse world, some excellent storytelling, and a friendly and dedicated community.
