= The Lord of the Rings Online: Siege of Mirkwood =

- Developer: Turbine, Inc.
- Publishers: Turbine, Inc.
- Engine: Turbine G3
- Platform: Microsoft Windows
- Release: December 1, 2009 (North America); December 3, 2009 (Europe)
- Genre: MMORPG
- Mode: Multiplayer

The Lord of the Rings Online: Siege of Mirkwood is the second retail expansion pack for the MMORPG The Lord of the Rings Online, released on December 1, 2009, in North America and December 3, 2009, in Europe. Unlike the base game and the first Mines of Moria expansion, it had no CD release and one was only available via web based download.

The expansion added the region of southern Mirkwood, including Dol Guldur. The game's level cap has been increased to level 65, and the expansion included the conclusion to Volume II of the Epic storyline. It also introduced a new "skirmish" system that allows for repeatable, randomised and scalable combat based instances that can be accessed from anywhere in the game world for 1, 3, 6 and 12 players and new 3, 6 and 12 player private instances that take place in Dol Guldur proper.

== Skirmish System ==
Skirmishes are repeatable, randomized and scalable combat based instances that can be accessed from anywhere in the game world and can be run with groups of 1, 3, 6 and 12 players. Alongside the player fights a customizable Skirmish soldier, a pet NPC which is set to perform one of six roles (which resemble many in-game player classes) and can be improved with various Skirmish traits. Skirmish Camps have been added to most Regions of the game's world that allow players to barer cosmetics, equipment and upgrades for their Skirmish soldier with marks earned awarded during Skirmishes.

With the expansion's release, twelve Skirmishes were made available, seven of which were set in the existing regions of Eriador and were available instantly, while the other five took place in the new Region of South Mirkwood and had to be unlocked through the Epic storyline. Six more Skirmishes were added in later years, for a total of eighteen. Originally skirmishes featured a unique set of currencies, making various items available at Skirmish Camp vendors available only through Skirmishes. When the next update introduced level scaling for several of the original Shadows of Angmar instances, they also used the Skirmish currencies, making the distinction less pronounced.

== Storyline ==
Upon release Siege of Mirkwood concluded the Mines of Moria story, the second of the Epic books overall. The third Epic story line, Allies of the King, launched shortly afterwards and focused on the Grey Company, being completely unrelated to Mirkwood. This storyline continues in the Rise of Isengard expansion.

=== Volume II: Mines of Moria ===
==== Book IX - Fortress of the Nazgul ====
A full-scale assault is launched against Dol Guldur by the Elves of Lothlorien, under the banners of the Golden Host. Meanwhile, a small band of Elves known as the Hidden Guard also crosses the river Anduin in secret, with Mazog as their prisoner, accompanied by the player and the dwarf Broin. They seek to exchange the life of Mazog for the life of the prisoners, including dwarf Bori. Yet while the military campaign of the Golden Host goes well, the Hidden Guard faces the risk of disaster from the very start: the scout Raddir is found dead before he reveals the planned route and soon the scholar Issuriel is poisoned by the deadly spiders alongside Mazog. The stout elf Achardor becomes furious that his friend has been wounded and threatens to take Mazog's life if Issuriel dies. Issuriel speaks of a rare antidote that will cure the poison but later refuses to take it, allowing Mazog to take it instead. Achardor is even more outraged with this action taken, but just before Issuriel loses her life, the dwarf Broin brings another portion of antidote and the quest to Dol Guldur continues.

The Hidden Guard soon reaches the gates of Dol Guldur where the planned exchange takes place. But Gorothul and the Ringwraiths who arrive at the scene refuse to hand over Bori, and Achardor sacrifices himself to allow the rest to escape, while Mazog goes with Gorothul into Dol Guldur. The mission of the Hidden Guard is a total failure, yet the military campaign of the Golden Host goes extremely well: multiple adversaries are slain, enemy communications are disrupted and the Tower of Dol Guldur itself besieged. The task meant to be secret is accomplished by force and Bori is rescued from the Dungeons of Dol Guldur. He recounts a secret passage into tower, once used by Gandalf to find Thorin's father Thrain. The passage is used to launch a surprise assault and during battle in the tower, Broin slays Mazog, reclaiming the mithril axe Zigilburk.

==== Epilogue - Of Elves and Dwarves ====
While the assault was successful, the Elves do not have the strength to break the walls of the fortress. Enemy reinforcements are coming from the East and the Elves prepare to fall back beyond Anduin: the whole campaign was a diversion both to weaken the enemy and allow the Fellowship to safely depart Lothlorien. Both Elves and Dwarves finish the last deeds throughout southern Mirkwood, while the axe Zigilburk is buried yet again where the dwarves found it, to never wield its power again. The Elves of Lothlórien also strike several additional blows against the dark fortress, and Gorothul is challenged within his quarters in Sammath Gul, and finally defeated.

=== Volume III: Allies of the King ===
==== Book 1 - Oath of the Rangers ====
Elrond received a mysterious message from Galadriel, telling him to gather the Rangers of the North and send them to Rohan to help Aragorn. The player is summoned to the Last Homely House and given a list of Rangers to recruit: Radanir of the Trollshaws, Candaith of Weathertop, Saeradan of Bree-Land, Halros of the Shire, Halbarad from Esteldin, Calenglad from Evendim, Lothrandir from Forochel and finally Corunir and Golodir from Angmar. With the exception of Radanir, all Rangers are the ones player have interacted with during Epic Volume I. Joined by others of their kin, they form the Grey Company and meet Elrohir, Elladan and Lady Arwen, who passes to Halbarad the banner she has made for Aragorn.

==== Book 2 - Ride of the Grey Company ====
Setting forth from Rivendell, the Grey Company begins the journey south. While passing the Ring-Forges of Eregion, Halbarad asks a Dwarf-Jeweler to craft fake copies of the Ring of Barahir, in order to confuse their enemies and to buy Aragorn time should a member Grey Company be captured. Arriving in the lands of Enedwaith, the Rangers are trying to make peace with the local tribes and find an ally in Wadu, who is soon found dead. They eventually discover an old and confused Dwarf Nár, father of Ollfardh and old companion of Thrór. To everyone's amazement, he knows about the secret road the company is planning to take.

==== Book 3 - Echoes of the Dead ====
Nona, Wadu's sister, offers to join Grey Company to wage war against Saruman, which Halbarad absolutely refuses. While investigating who can be trusted and who can't, the Rangers receive word that of a band of Oathbreakers from Erech have been seen in Enedwaith. An attempt to remind them of their Oath to Isildur fails horribly when Candaith is killed. Angered Halbarad is finished with this land and leads the company on to Dunland. But as the player leaves Nár, the Dwarf finally reveals that Saruman the White had a hand in these events all along.

== Free updates ==
After the release of Siege of Mirkwood, the next major update saw the game's transition from the subscription-base model to the Free-to-Play model. To signify the transition, it was announced that future updates will not always be associated with a new book to the epic story, thus starting a new numbering of Game Updates.

=== Book 1: Oath of the Rangers ===
Book 1 was released on March 1, 2010.

Updates include (complete release notes):

- The beginning of Volume III in the epic story line.
- The ability to solo the Volume I epic story line.
- A duo mode for most skirmishes.
- Crafting updates.

=== Book 2: Ride of the Grey Company ===
Book 2 was released on September 10, 2010, in North America. (September 8, 2010 for subscribers). It was delayed in Europe due to contractual reasons, released on 2 November.

Updates include (complete release notes):

- New region: Enedwaith
- Lord of the Rings Online Free to Play subscription
- Book 2 in the Volume III epic storyline
- Scalable instances
- Improvements to the vault, and a new wardrobe system for cosmetic items
- Updates to the captain class
- The LOTRO store, where players may purchase convenience items. Points either earned through gameplay, through the VIP program or by being purchased.
- The introduction of Lua Scripting
- DirectX 11 support

=== Update 1: Journey to Winter-Home ===
The first post Free-to-play update was released in the United States on November 29, 2010, and in Europe on December 7, 2010. Due to changes to how updates are scheduled, it did not contain an update to the epic book.

Updates include (complete release notes):

- A Barter Wallet for skirmish marks and anniversary tokens
- Opening of Moria, Lothlórien, Mirkwood and Enedwaith to free-to-play players. Volume II and Volume III will also be available, as well the legendary item system and the lvl 65 level cap all to free-to-play players.
- Vault improvements
- Tasks: a new quest type for all levels
- Improved reputation mounts
- Updates to the Lore-Master and Rune-Keeper classes
- Ered Luin starting area revamp
- The Yule festival, including a new mini zone, Winter-Home

=== Update 2: Echoes of the Dead ===
Echoes of the Dead was released on March 21, 2011, in the United States and on March 24 in Europe.

Updates include (complete release notes):

- Two three man's, two six man's instances, and a 12-person raid, were added for level 65 players
- A special item required to craft a first age Weapon which drops from the above raid.
- Radiance was removed.
- Legendary Items got the first part of a two part update.
- Character panel and cosmetic system revamp
- Minstrel, hunter and Burglar updates
- Volume III Book 3 was added.
- Volume II was revamped and made soloable, including three instances which have now been converted to skirmishes.
- Improvements to the PvP starter tutorial.
- Evendim was revamped, with Annuminas being scaled down to level 40

=== Update 3: Lost Legends of Eriador ===
Update 3 was released on May 23.

Updates include (complete release notes):

- Two new three-man scalable instances starting mid-game, set in Angmar and the Forsaken Inn
- Two new skirmishes, set in Forochel and North Downs

== Critical reception ==
IGN gave the expansion a positive review, noting despite the smaller landmass update compared to Moria it does not lack in content, which makes the reduced price tag justified.
