= The Lord of the Rings Online: Mines of Moria =

- Developer: Turbine, Inc.
- Publishers: Turbine, Inc. Warner Bros. Interactive Entertainment; Codemasters
- Composer: Chance Thomas
- Platform: Microsoft Windows
- Release: November 18, 2008
- Genre: Massively multiplayer online role-playing game
- Mode: Multiplayer

The Lord of the Rings Online: Mines of Moria is the first expansion pack for the massively multiplayer online role-playing game The Lord of the Rings Online released on November 18, 2008. It added the new game regions of Moria and Lothlórien, two new character classes and a new Legendary Items system. Level cap was raised to 60 and the main storyline was extended by six books of the new Epic Volume II.

== Gameplay ==
The expansion expanded the world of Middle-earth by introducing Rhovanion and its first two regions: Moria and Lothlórien. Moria is divided into ten distinct areas spread across the Upper, Middle and Lower levels, each with unique appearance and role in the history of Khazad-dûm. Lothlórien was added in an update several months after the main expansion and provides much-needed rest after the long dark for players and characters alike.

Moria contained 7 six-man group instances, 2 three-man instances and 3 twelve-man raids. A new concept introduced to the raids was "radiance". Raid instances and bosses inside them gave a progressive "gloom" debuff stats that could only be countered by an equal amount of radiance, found on specific pieces of equipment. Because radiance gear could be inferior to alternative options in all other aspects, this mechanic proved unpopular and was removed from the game within two years.

Seven original classes from Shadows of Angmar were supplemented by two new ones: Warden and Rune-keeper. Rune-keepers are a ranged class with an attunement towards either dealing damage or healing wounds. As a Rune-keeper uses either healing or damaging abilities, the Rune-keeper's proficiency in either focus increases and more powerful skills become available. Wardens use melee weapons with a preference toward spears and specialize in combination attacks. A Warden will execute their abilities in certain sequences of "Gambits" that will eventually culminate in a special attack only available after completing the prescribed set of moves.

=== Legendary items ===
Mines of Moria introduced the Legendary Item system designed to replicate the famous weapons in Tolkien lore, such as Bilbo's Sting, Gandalf's Glamdring and Aragorn's Andúril. Each class would acquire and equip two new items: a main hand weapon, and a class item. These Legendary items ranged in base power by level, rarity (Third-, Second-, or First Age), and the attributes assigned to them. Each Legendary Item initially started with two to four random Legacies that affected the existing class skills, with three to four more available to be selected as the Legendary Item increased in levels. Because the number and the potency of Legacies were unpredictable, it forced players to try several different Legendary Items before fully investing in one. The Legendary Items gained experience from quest completions and defeating enemies, increasing in levels alongside their owner until the item reached its cap. Heritage runes could be applied for additional experience, and relics and titles could be applied to further increase the Legendary Item's power.

When originally introduced, the Legendary Item System had the intended effect of prolonging the usage of player's favorite weapons as opposed to them being replaced every time a better piece of equipment is acquired. In practice, the Legendary Item's power was still capped by its level, so with each new expansion a common Third Age item would quickly outperform an exquisite First Age item from the previous level cap, forcing the players to start building all of their items anew. The Legendary Item System received several changes, and in 2014 "imbuement" of Legendary Items was introduced, allowing the players to lock their Legendary Item to their level and select their desired Legacies directly, bypassing the randomization. Finally in 2021 Fate of Gundabad expansion the original Legendary Item system was fully retired and replaced with a completely different, simplified option.

== Plot ==
=== Volume II: Mines of Moria ===
==== Book I - The Walls of Moria ====
An Iron Garrison of Dwarves sent by King Dain Ironfoot led by Bosi and Brogur, sons of Bifur and Bofur, begins to excavate the Hollin Gate shortly after the Fellowship's passage. When the last rocks are cleared, the Watcher in the Water attacks the assembled Dwarves, taking Brogur's son Broin. As the Dwarves regroup, they turn their hopes to a discovered cache of older weapons from a bygone age. Arming themselves with such weapons, the Iron Garrison faces the Watcher again and drives it from the Black Pool, entering into Moria.

==== Book II - Echoes in the Dark ====
Establishing themselves in their new home, the Iron Garrison begins the task of rediscovering the lore and artifacts of their heritage. One such passage of lore speaks of an ancient Dwarf-smith who endeavored to create an axe of solid mithril. An entire forge was created specifically for it, The Heart of Fire is unearthed but the axe, Zigilburk, is nowhere to be found. Heartened by the recovery of one of their greatest forges, Brogur pushes onward into Moria.

==== Book III - The Lord of Moria ====
Brogur establishes a command post in the Twenty-First Hall, only to learn of the White Hand minions nearby. Bosi's son Bori executes a strike against the White Hand, sneaking into their camp and defeating its commander who speaks the name of Mazog, son of Bolg, Lord of Moria. This news weighs heavy on Bosi, as the Book of Mazarbul reveals Mazog as the orc responsible for the demise of Balin's company.

==== Book IV - Fire and Water ====
The Orcs and Dwarves prepare for war. Bori takes a look at the Book of Mazarbul, finding mention of Óin who went off in search of Zigilburk. Bori and the player follow Óin's path, which leads to a flooded treasury There they find not only Zigilburk, but also Broin, wounded yet alive, and the Watcher in the Water. The player drives the Watcher from the hall once again, and the Dwarves return in victory.

==== Book V - Drums in the Deep ====
It is discovered that Mazog is allied with Dol Guldur, and Bori plans a raid on his seat of power to defeat Mazog once and for all. Gorothul, Sauron's servant from Dol Guldur, ruins his plan and Bori is captured along with the legendary axe Zigilburk. Bosi loses hope in the expedition's efforts to reclaim Moria and leaves it up to the player to see to the defenses during a major raid by Mazog's forces, in which the Dwarves hold for a time.

==== Book VI - The Shadowy Abyss ====
Bosi seeks help from the Elves of Lothlórien, and a company of elves ventures into the Foundations of Stone in the lowest depths of Moria. The player is instructed to find clues of Gandalf's passage through this area and his fate following the fall from the Bridge of Khazad-Dum. Together with the elf Magor the player defeats a nameless creature in the depths of Moria. Hearing of the victory, Lady Galadriel summons the player to Caras Galadhon.

==== Book VII - Leaves of Lórien ====
Bosi is granted an audience with Celeborn and Galadriel, and a contingent of Galadhrim is dispatched to aid the Dwarves in Moria. A record of a secret passage to Mazog's in uncovered and through it, elves and dwarves working together capture Mazog is captured. Bori is nowhere to be found, having already been sent to Dol Guldur. Lord Celeborn grants the player an audience, commending them while also disagreeing on the notion of sparing Mazog's life.

==== Book VIII - Scourge of Khazad-dûm ====
Mazog lets slip a chilling fact: that he's not interested in being a king of Moria because Moria will soon become not fit even for orcs. He is referring to the rise of ancient nameless creatures from within the depth of Moria, which concerns both the elves in Foundations of Stone and the dwarves in the Upper levels. Several relics left by Gorothul are found to attract the nameless creatures but are destroyed by the player.

The conclusion of the Epic Volume 2 takes place within the Siege of Mirkwood expansion.

== Soundtrack ==
Video game composer Chance Thomas who worked on the base game of The Lord of the Rings Online returned to work on the expansion. A compilation album was released as a CD with the Collector's Edition of the expansion.

== Critical reception ==
Reception

Aggregate scores
Aggregator	Score
GameRankings	87%
Metacritic	85/100

Review scores
Publication	Score
1Up.com	B+
Computer and Video Games	8.5/10
Eurogamer	9/10
GameSpot	8.5/10
GameSpy	4.5/5
GameZone	9.4/10
IGN	8.7/10
D+PAD Magazine	4/5

Mines of Moria has been praised for its attention to detail, with GameSpot's Kevin VanOrd stating, "The bowels of Middle-earth have no right to be this interesting to investigate..." WarCry.com went so far as to call it "[t]he best fantasy MMORPG yet created". Eurogamer observed the story as one of the high points, stating that frequently this is a weakness of many MMOs. Rather, LotRO was said to be faithful to Tolkien's original narrative, and thus provided a very good storyline.
