= Forests in Middle-earth =

Theme in Tolkien's fiction

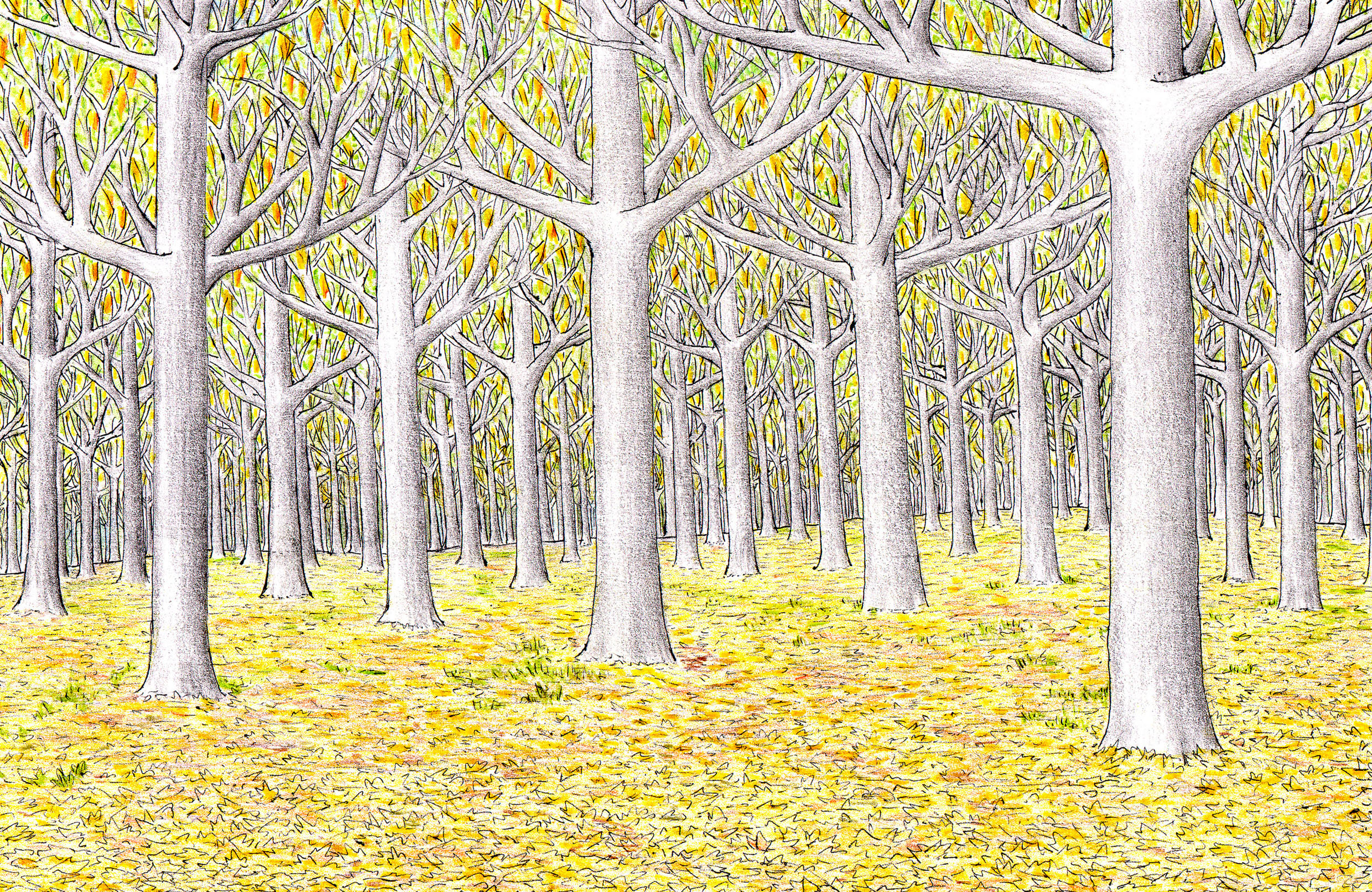
Artist's impression of a stand of J. R. R. Tolkien's fictional Mallorn trees with green and silver leaves in the Elvish stronghold of Lothlórien

Forests appear repeatedly in J. R. R. Tolkien's fantasy world of Middle-earth. In The Hobbit, Bilbo Baggins and party have adventures in the Trollshaws and in Mirkwood. In The Lord of the Rings, Frodo Baggins and his companions travel through woods in The Shire, and are pursued by Black Riders; to evade them, the party enters the feared Old Forest, where they encounter other hazards. Later the Fellowship comes to the Elvish forest realm of Lothlórien; and after the Fellowship has split up, Frodo and Sam Gamgee travel through Ithilien with its Mediterranean vegetation, while Merry Brandybuck and Pippin Took enter the ancient forest of Fangorn. The Riders of Rohan, on their way to war, are allowed to travel on a secret road through another ancient forest, that of the Drúedain or woses. The Silmarillion, too, features several forests, both in Beleriand which is home to places like the Elvish forest realm of Doriath, protected by the magic of Melian the Maia, and in the south of Valinor, where the Valar liked to hunt in the woods of Oromë.

Critics note that Middle-earth was set in the distant past, when primeval forests still existed. Forests play varying roles in his books. In The Hobbit, Mirkwood is the dark forbidding forest of fairy tale. In The Lord of the Rings, scholars suggest that the forests symbolise nature as opposed to industrialisation, but also embody links to fairy tale and folklore, and carry a psychological message.

== Context ==
J. R. R. Tolkien was a scholar of English literature, a philologist and medievalist interested in language and poetry from the Middle Ages, especially that of Anglo-Saxon England and Northern Europe. His professional knowledge of works such as Beowulf shaped his fictional world of Middle-earth, including his fantasy novel The Lord of the Rings. (Note: Carpenter 2023, #131) Middle-earth, or more precisely the world of Arda, represents what Paul Kocher has called "our own green and solid Earth at some quite remote epoch in the past."

== Forests ==
Tolkien makes use of forests across Middle-earth, from the Trollshaws and Mirkwood in The Hobbit, reappearing in The Lord of the Rings, to the Old Forest, Lothlórien, Fangorn, and the Mediterranean forest in Ithilien, all of which feature in chapters of The Lord of the Rings, and the great forests of Beleriand, a region of the west of Middle-earth, lost at the end of the First Age, and Valinor, the blessed realm, mentioned in The Silmarillion. Indeed, while Middle-earth was still "in a twilight under the stars", the "oldest living things had arisen: ... on earth, the shadows of great trees". (Note: Tolkien 1977, "Quenta Silmarillion", ch. 3 "Of the Coming of the Elves and the Captivity of Melkor")

=== The Hobbit ===
Bilbo and his party travel from his home in the Shire into the wild, encountering the Trolls in the Trollshaws, a wooded region, lying north of the East Road between the rivers Hoarwell and Bruinen. Described as "the Trolls' wood" in the main text, the name "Trollshaws" is derived from troll and shaw, an archaic term for a thicket or small wood.

After crossing the Misty Mountains and the Great River (Anduin), the party run into difficulty in Mirkwood, a vast and dark forest with stands of fir trees, and in other places of oak and beech. The wizard Gandalf calls it "the greatest forest of the Northern world." (Note: Tolkien 1937, ch. 7 "Queer Lodgings") Before it was darkened by evil, it had been called Greenwood the Great. (Note: Tolkien 1977, "Of the Rings of Power and the Third Age")

=== The Lord of the Rings ===
The Old Forest

"Are the stories about it true?" asked Pippin.

"I don't know what stories you mean", Merry answered. "If you mean the old bogey-stories Fatty's nurses used to tell him ... I should say no .... But the Forest is queer. Everything in it is very much more alive, more aware of what is going on, so to speak, than things are in the Shire. And the trees do not like strangers. They watch you. They are usually content merely to watch you, as long as daylight lasts, and don't do much. Occasionally the most unfriendly ones may drop a branch, or stick a root out, or grasp at you with a long trailer. But at night things can be most alarming, or so I am told. I have only once or twice been in here after dark, and then only near the hedge. I thought all the trees were whispering to each other, passing news and plots along in an unintelligible language; and the branches swayed and groped without any wind. They do say the trees actually move, and can surround strangers and hem them in." (Note: Tolkien 1954a, book 1, ch. 6 "The Old Forest")

In The Lord of the Rings, Frodo Baggins and his companions travel through familiar woods in The Shire, and are pursued by Black Riders; to evade them, the party decides to enter the Old Forest. (Note: Tolkien 1954a, book 1, ch. 5 "A Conspiracy Unmasked") It is an ancient woodland just beyond the eastern borders of the Shire, and somewhat feared by most of the Shire's inhabitants. Merry Brandybuck, who lives in Buckland near the Old Forest, knows a little more than the other Hobbits, but none of them are prepared for what happens to them when they try to cross the forest.

Lothlórien is the enchanted realm of the Elves who remain in Middle-earth in the Third Age. (Note: Tolkien 1954a, Book 2, ch. 6 "Lothlórien", and ch. 7 "The Mirror of Galadriel") Its forests include a stand of tall Mallorn trees, (Note: Tolkien 1980, Part 2, ch. 1 "A Description of Númenor") in which the Elves live on high platforms in their tree city of Caras Galadhon. (Note: Tolkien 1954a, Book 2, ch. 8 "Farewell to Lórien") The forest, unlike the rest of Middle-earth, has "no stain", remaining as things were before the Marring of Arda, and seemingly shining with its own golden light.

Merry Brandybuck and Pippin Took enter the ancient forest of Fangorn, at the southern end of the Misty Mountains. It shares its name with the leader of the Ents, ancient treelike giants who live there, herding the trees. (Note: Tolkien 1954, book 3, ch. 4 "Treebeard") Some of the trees, Huorns, are awakening, seemingly becoming sentient, and becoming more like Ents, or are Ents who are falling asleep and becoming more "treelike". (Note: Tolkien 1954, book 3, ch. 9: "Flotsam and Jetsam".)

Frodo and Sam Gamgee travel through the fertile Ithilien, far to the south of the Shire; it still has attractive Mediterranean forest, despite its proximity to the evil land of Mordor. (Note: Tolkien 1954a, book 4, ch. 4 "Of Herbs and Stewed Rabbit") (Note: Tolkien 1954a, book 4, ch. 7 "Journey to the Cross-Roads") Critics have noted its resemblance to Italy, both in latitude and in its Mediterranean vegetation: "Many great trees grew there, ... and groves and thickets there were of tamarisk and pungent terebinth, of olive and of bay; and there were junipers and myrtles".

The forest of the Drúedain is ancient, populated by a race who resemble the mythological woodwoses, the wild men of the woods of Britain and Europe, and who are named as woses by the Riders of Rohan. The woses, angered by the actions of the enemy, allow the Riders to travel on a secret road through their forest. (Note: Tolkien 1955, Book 5, ch. 5, "The Ride of the Rohirrim")

=== The Silmarillion ===
Beleriand's major forests include the Forest of Brethil, the Elvish forest realm of Doriath, home to the Sindar, and the great southern forest of Taur-im-Duinath, occupying much of East Beleriand. (Note: Tolkien 1977, "Index of Names") Doriath is protected by the "girdle of Melian", a magical defence around Thingol's forest kingdom.

The southern part of the blessed realm of Valinor contains the Woods of Oromë, where the Vala liked to hunt. (Note: Tolkien 1977, ch. 8 "Of the Darkening of Valinor")

== Analysis ==
=== Dark forbidding forest of fairy tale ===
Fangorn Forest

Even as he spoke the dark edge of the forest loomed up straight before them. Night seemed to have taken refuge under its great trees, creeping away from the coming Dawn. ... [Merry] led the way in under the huge branches of the trees. Old beyond guessing, they seemed. Great trailing beards of lichen hung from them, blowing and swaying in the breeze. (Note: Tolkien 1954 Book 3, ch. 3 "The Uruk-Hai")

Michael Brisbois, writing in Tolkien Studies, comments that in The Lord of the Rings, the mainly broadleaf or mixed forests, with coniferous forests on higher ground as at Rivendell and southern Mirkwood, are realistic enough to lead the reader through into "the hyperreal" and then into "the fantastic". For the Tolkien scholar Tom Shippey, the mention of Mirkwood is an echo of the Norse mythology of the Elder Edda, with the pathless forests of the North over the Misty Mountains mentioned in one of the poems in the Edda, the Skirnismal. Tolkien used the name Mirkwood also of Taur-nu-Fuin in Beleriand (in Dorthonion, to the east of Gondolin), in the view of Tolkien's biographer John Garth "deliberately entangl[ing] the two forests." Damian O'Byrne writes that "the forests of Middle-earth possess a dark agency of their own; they are malevolent places where paths 'shift and change from time to time in queer fashion'", while Taur-nu-Fuin is "a region of such dread and dark enchantment that even the Orcs would not enter it unless need drove them".

The Tolkien scholars Shelley Saguaro and Deborah Cogan Thacker state that Mirkwood's role in The Hobbit is both to be the dark forbidding forest of fairy tale as Bilbo pursues his quest as in "a classical quest narrative", and to have the familiar qualities of a real wood. The forests and trees of The Lord of the Rings are, however, "much more complex": trees may change, whether by being "woken up by Elves" as were the Ents, or "going bad" like some of the trees in the Old Forest. Saguaro and Thacker note that forests recur in fairy stories, as places where the protagonist becomes lost, where witches and woodcutters and wolves live. They recall that in Tree and Leaf, Tolkien's account of fairy tales, such stories are in his words "unanalysable .. outside Time itself maybe". Saguaro and Thacker mention the psychoanalyst Bruno Bettelheim's interpretation, that going into the forest "signifies a psychoanalytic space – a place separated from everyday experience in which to be lost is to be found", and Jack Zipes's alternative view, based on his analysis of the Brothers Grimm, that the forest makes enchantment possible, because the conventions of society do not apply there.

=== Communion with non-industrialized nature ===
Tolkien's biographer John Garth writes that the great forests, the "tree-woven lands" of Middle-earth, symbolise nature as opposed to development and industrialisation, "against the axe and furnace". Tolkien's own position was that the primeval human understanding is, as he wrote in his 1964 book Tree and Leaf, "communion with other living things", now lost. The Tolkien scholar Paul Kocher states that Middle-earth is meant to be the Earth itself in the distant past, when the primeval forests still existed, and with them, a wholeness that is also now lost. He adds that a forest like Fangorn "may be dire and mysterious but its trees are the same oaks, chestnuts, beeches, and rowans that make up our woods." Saguaro and Thacker write that while it might seem that Tolkien is using forests mainly to represent the natural world, as against the industrial modern world, they are rather "a multi-layered portrayal, with subtle links to fairy tale and folklore, and complex psychological symbolism."
