= Environmentalism in The Lord of the Rings =

Theme in J. R. R. Tolkien's writing

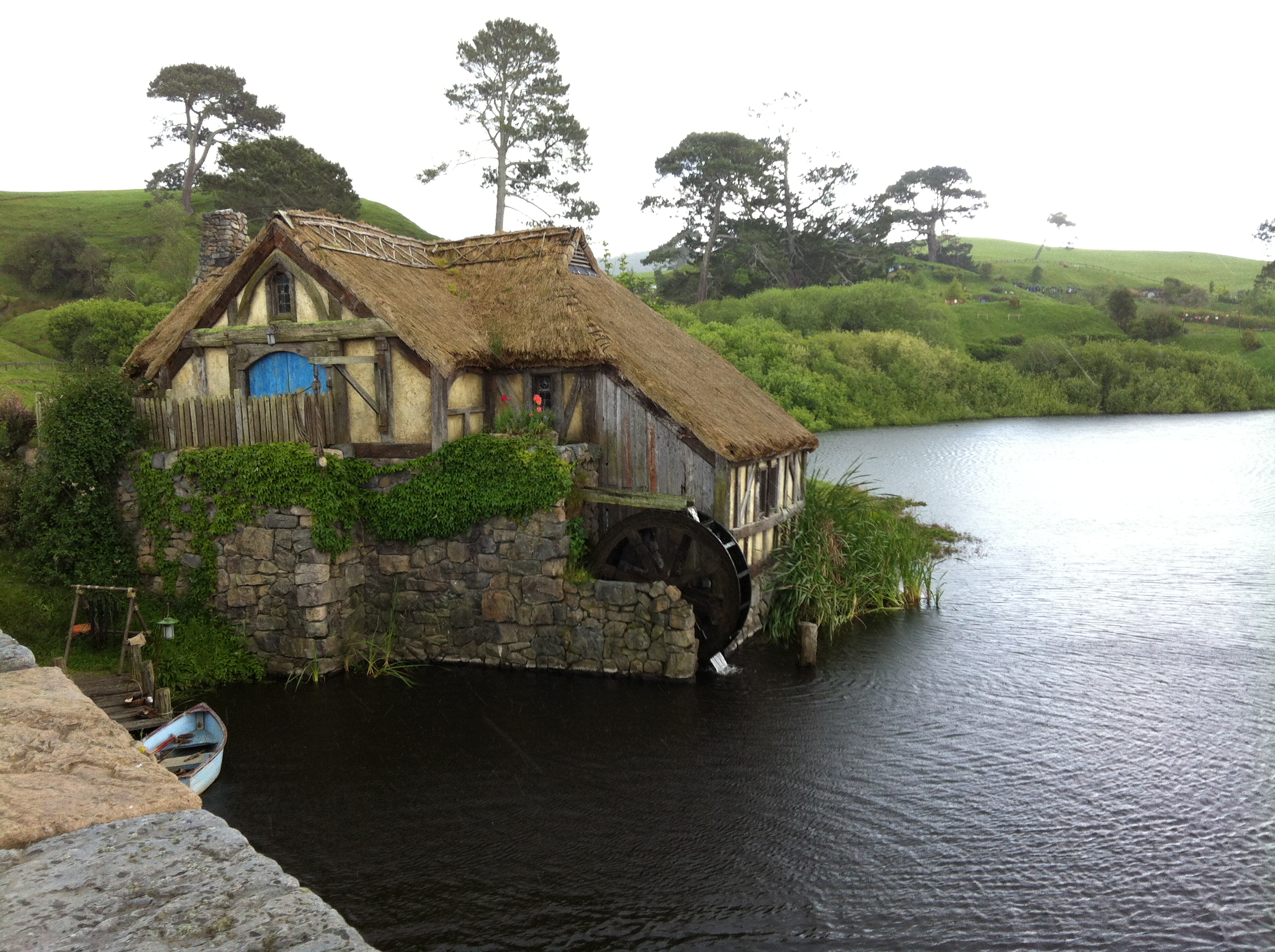
Pastoral vision of an unspoilt England: the Old Mill at Hobbiton, constructed as reimagined for the filming of Peter Jackson's The Lord of the Rings

The theme of environmentalism in The Lord of the Rings has been remarked upon by critics since the 1970s. The Hobbits' visions of Saruman's industrial hell of Isengard and Sauron's desolate polluted land of Mordor have been interpreted as comments on modern society, while the destruction of Isengard by the tree-giant Ents, and "The Scouring of the Shire" by the Hobbits, have a strong theme of restoration of the natural environment after such industrial pollution and degradation. However, Tolkien's love of trees and unspoilt nature is apparent throughout the novel.

== Context ==
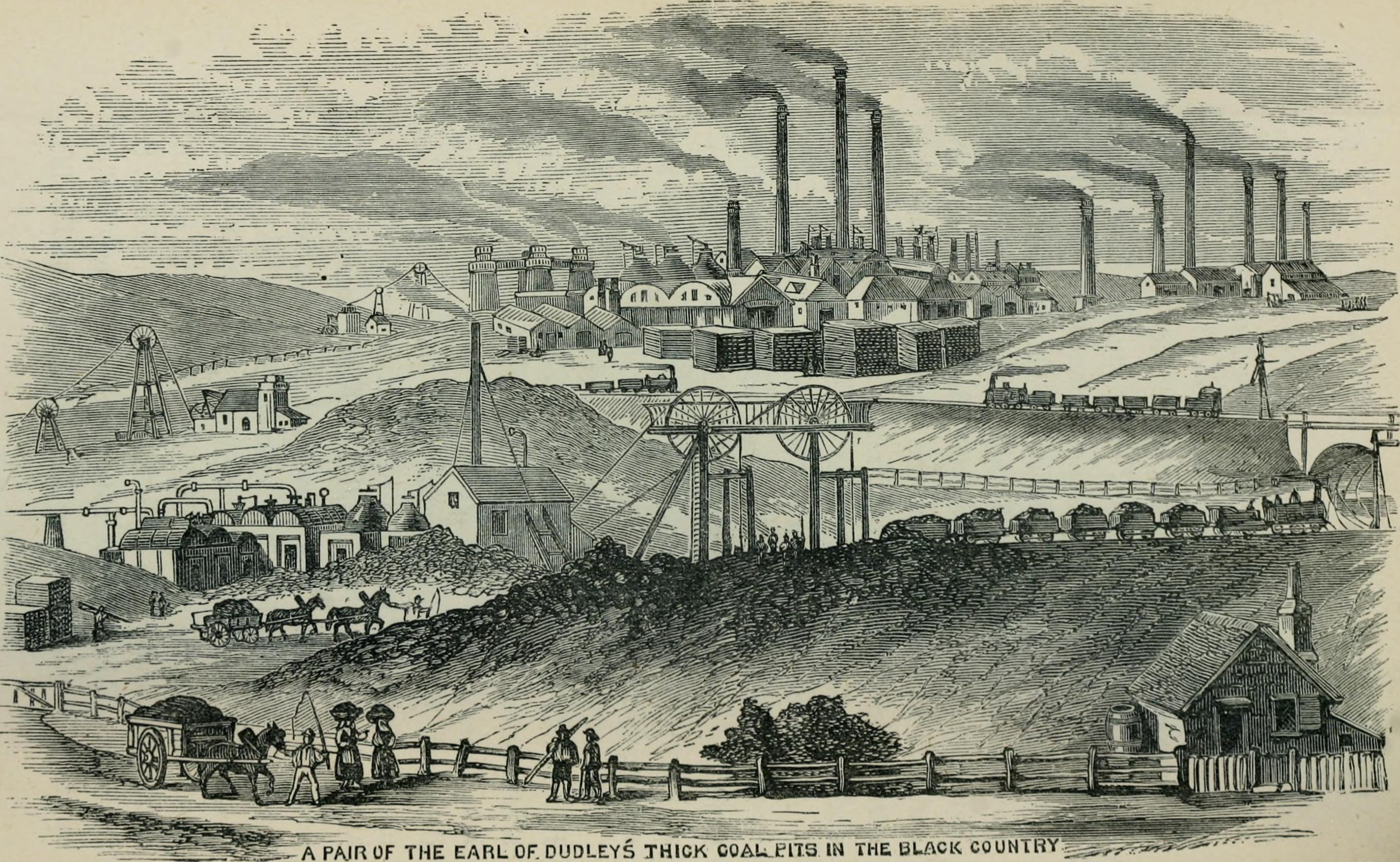
Mines, ironworks, smoke, and spoil heaps: the Black Country, near Tolkien's childhood home, has been suggested as an influence on his vision of Mordor.

J. R. R. Tolkien was brought up as a boy first in rural Warwickshire at Sarehole, at that time just outside Birmingham, and then inside that industrial city. An art exhibition entitled "The Making of Mordor" at the Wolverhampton Art Gallery (2014) claimed that the steelworks and blast furnaces of the West Midlands near Tolkien's childhood home inspired his vision of Mordor, and the name that he gave it, meaning "Black Land" in his invented Elvish language of Sindarin. (Note: Carpenter 2023, #297 to Mr. Rang, draft, August 1967) This industrialized area has long been known as "the Black Country". Philip Womack, writing in The Independent, likened Tolkien's move from rural Warwickshire to urban Birmingham as "exile from a rural idyll to Mordor-like forges and fires", The critic Chris Baratta notes the contrasting environments of the well-tended leafy Shire, the home of the Hobbits, and "the industrial wastelands of Isengard and Mordor." Baratta comments that Tolkien clearly intended the reader to "identify with some of the problems of environmental destruction, rampant industrial invasion, and the corrupting and damaging effects these have on mankind." Tolkien was acutely sensitive to encroachments on the English countryside; during the Second World War, he was, like W. G. Hoskins, horrified by how much land was taken up by aerodromes. Later in life, Tolkien became obsessed with the growing threat to the countryside as cities grew and roads cut across fields and woods.

== Pristine creation ==
=== Wild nature ===
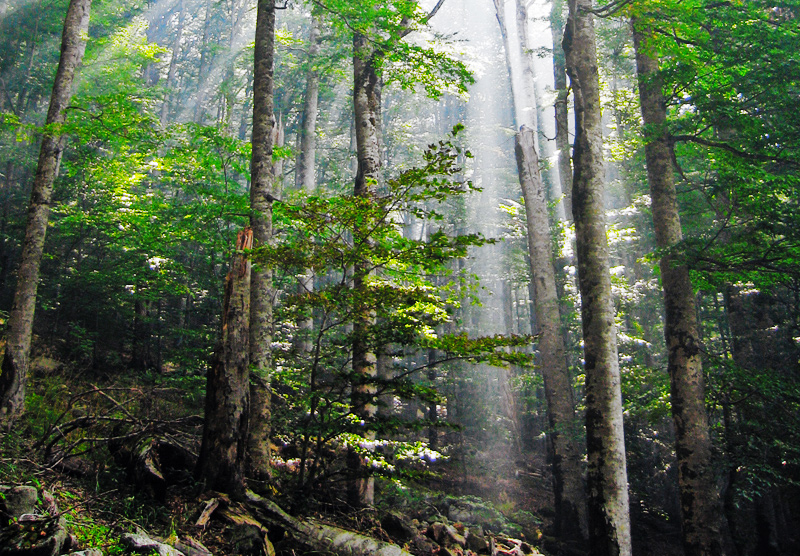
Primeval forest: sunlight streaming through undisturbed beech trees

Tolkien makes use of wild nature in the form of forests in Middle-earth, from the Trollshaws and Mirkwood in The Hobbit, reappearing in The Lord of the Rings, to the Old Forest, Lothlórien, and Fangorn forest which each occupy whole chapters of The Lord of the Rings, not to mention the great forests of Beleriand and Valinor of The Silmarillion. Indeed, while Middle-earth was still "in a twilight under the stars", the "oldest living things had arisen: ... on earth, the shadows of great trees". (Note: Tolkien 1977, "Quenta Silmarillion", ch. 3 "Of the Coming of the Elves and the Captivity of Melkor") For the Tolkien critic Tom Shippey, the mention of Mirkwood is an echo of the Norse mythology of the Elder Edda, with the pathless forests of the North over the Misty Mountains described in one of the poems in the Edda, the Skirnismal. Tolkien believed that the primeval human understanding was, as he wrote in Tree and Leaf, "communion with other living things", now lost. The Tolkien critic Paul Kocher stated that Middle-earth was meant to be the Earth itself in the distant past, when the primeval forests still existed, and with them, a wholeness that is also now lost.

=== Harmony with the land ===
The free peoples of the West of Middle-earth, including the Hobbits of the Shire, live in definite harmony with their land; Lucas Niiler describes the whole area as "a largely pastoral setting with an agriculturally-based economy", and the Hobbits as "caring farmers, green-thumbs; beer-barley, rich tobacco and beautiful flowers spring up out of their fields and gardens with just the gentle prod of a hoe."

== Environmental devastation ==
In the foreword to the Second Edition of The Lord of the Rings, Tolkien wrote that while the work had no "allegorical significance ... whatsoever", (Note: Tolkien 1954a, "Foreword to the Second Edition") it did have a basis in his personal experience. He stated that "The country in which I lived in childhood was being shabbily destroyed before I was ten", as Birmingham grew and spread houses, roads and suburban railways across the Warwickshire countryside, and he lamented "the last decrepitude of the once-thriving corn-mill beside its pool that long ago seemed to me so important".

Tolkien describes the shattering impact of industrialisation at Saruman's Isengard and in Sauron's dead land of Mordor. Tolkien's feelings about nature fit into a more general pattern of decline, the belief that while evil may be countered, the losses will not quite be made up. As Kocher writes "Ents may still be there in our forests, but what forests have we left? The process of extermination is already well under way in the Third Age, and in works outside the epic Tolkien bitterly deplores its climax today."

=== Saruman's Isengard ===
Tolkien has the Treebeard, leader of the tree-giants, the Ents, say of the Wizard Saruman: (Note: Tolkien 1954, book 3, ch. 4 "Treebeard")

He is plotting to become a Power. He has a mind of metal and wheels; and he does not care for growing things ... He has taken up with foul folk, with the Orcs. ... Worse than that: he has been doing something to them; something dangerous. For these Isengarders are more like wicked Men. It is a mark of evil things that came in the Great Darkness that they cannot abide the Sun; but Saruman's Orcs can endure it, even if they hate it. I wonder what he has done? ...

Down on the borders they are felling trees — good trees. Some of the trees they just cut down and leave to rot — orc-mischief that; but most are hewn up and carried off to feed the fires of Orthanc. There is always a smoke rising from Isengard these days.

— The Two Towers, book 3, ch. 4 "Treebeard"

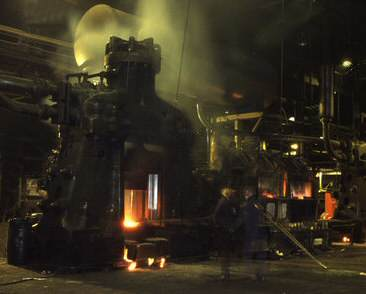
"...hammers thudded. At night plumes of vapour steamed from the vents, lit from beneath with red light". (Note: Tolkien 1954, book 3, ch. 8 "The Road to Isengard") Steam hammer at work, England

Saruman's Isengard is industrial in several ways: it produces weapons and machinery made of iron, smelted and forged using trees as fuel; an unusually large and powerful breed of Orcs, able as Treebeard says to fight in daylight, produced rapidly, apparently by some kind of cloning; and a gunpowder-like explosive. The underground factories, and the contrast with how the area was before Saruman's day, are described by the narrator in "The Road to Isengard":

Once it had been green and filled with avenues, and groves of fruitful trees, watered by streams that flowed from the mountains to a lake. But no green thing grew there in the latter days of Saruman....

The shafts ran down by many slopes and spiral stairs to caverns far under; there Saruman had treasuries, store-houses, armouries, smithies, and great furnaces. Iron wheels revolved there endlessly, and hammers thudded. At night plumes of vapour steamed from the vents, lit from beneath with red light, or blue, or venomous green.

Saruman thus stands for the exact opposite of the sympathetic stewardship of Middle-earth shown by the Hobbits of the Shire and by Treebeard of Fangorn forest.

=== Industrial hell ===
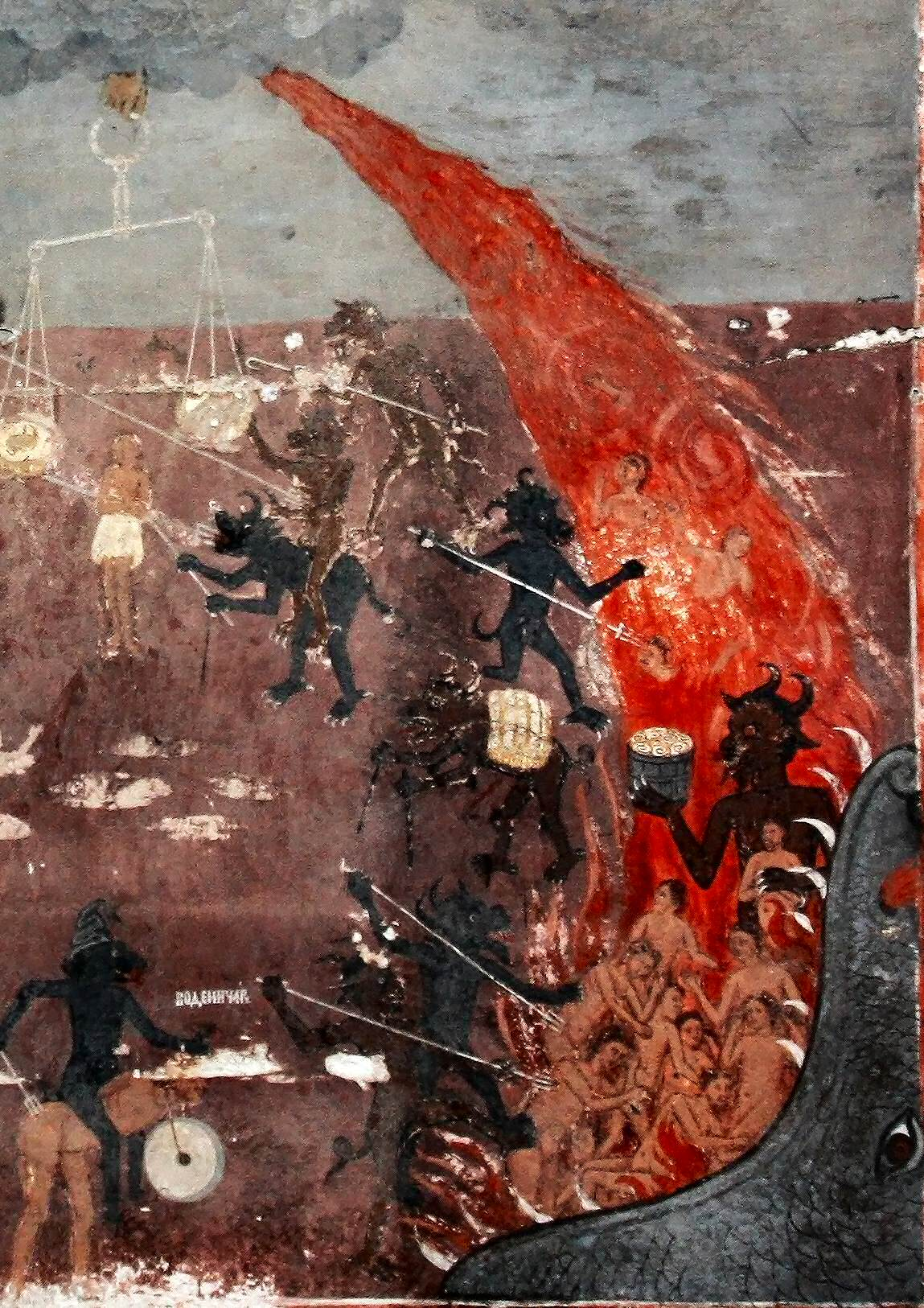
The "industrial hell" of Isengard, in Tolkien's words "tunneled .. dark .. deep .. graveyard of unquiet dead .. furnaces". Medieval fresco of hell, St Nicholas in Raduil, Bulgaria

The scholar of English literature Charles A. Huttar describes Isengard as an "industrial hell". He quotes Tolkien's description of Isengard, supplying his own emphasis on Tolkien's words: "tunneled .. circle .. dark .. deep .. graveyard of unquiet dead .. the ground trembled .. treasuries .. furnaces .. iron wheels .. endlessly .. lit from beneath .. venomous." Huttar comments: "The imagery is familiar, its connotations plain. This is yet another hell [after Moria and Mordor]."

Dickerson writes that Saruman's "evil ways" are revealed exactly by his "wanton destruction" of Fangorn's trees, and notes that Treebeard calls Saruman an "accursed tree-slayer". (Note: Tolkien 1955, book 6, ch. 6 "Many Partings") Kocher notes that Treebeard says that Ents have a far closer sympathy for trees than shepherds do for their sheep, because "Ents are 'good at getting inside other things'". He also cites Treebeard's statement that he is "not altogether on anybody's side, because nobody is altogether on my side ... nobody cares for the woods as I care for them", but notes that all the same, Treebeard is driven by the knowledge that Saruman has taken sides in the War of the Ring to take action against him. Treebeard's Ents destroy Saruman's industrial Isengard, whose factories Saruman was fuelling by cutting down Treebeard's trees. After the destruction of the One Ring, Aragorn gives wide lands for new forest; but, Kocher writes, Tolkien gives "ominous hints that the wild wood will not prosper in the expanding Age of Man" that will follow.

== A longed-for restoration ==
=== Trees marching to war ===
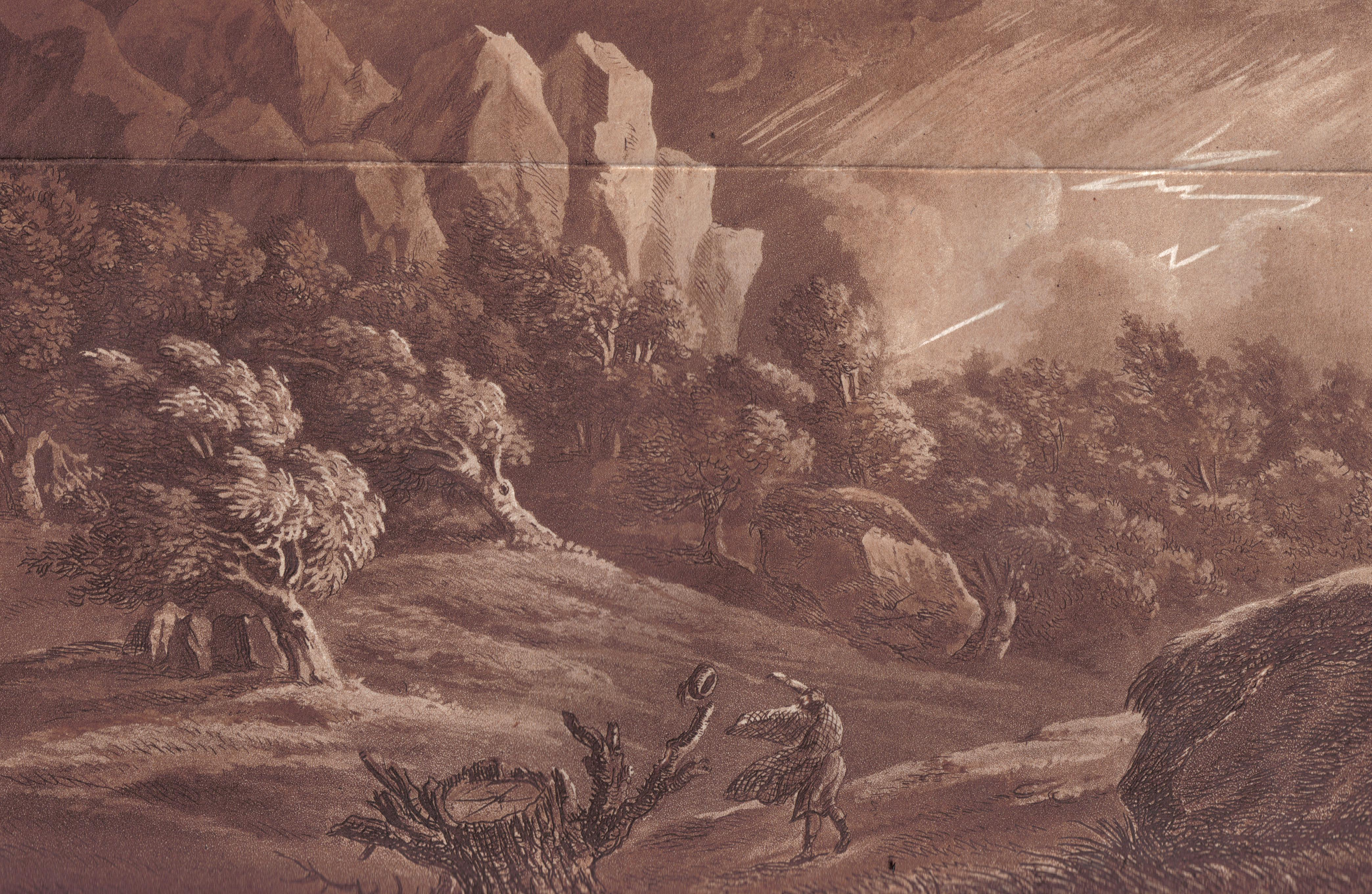
Macbeth at a wild Birnam Wood, by John Stoddart, 1800

Macbeth: I will not be afraid of death and bane, till Birnam forest come to Dunsinane.

— Shakespeare, Macbeth, Act 5, scene 3.

In The Lord of the Rings, on the morning after the long night of the Battle of Helm's Deep, in which Saruman tried to destroy Rohan, both armies saw that a forest of angry, tree-like Huorns now filled the valley, trapping Saruman's army of Orcs. The Orcs fled into the Huorn forest and were destroyed. (Note: Tolkien 1954, book 3, ch. 7 "Helm's Deep")

Tolkien noted in a letter that he had created walking tree-creatures [Ents and Huorns] partly in response to his "bitter disappointment and disgust from schooldays with the shabby use made in Shakespeare's Macbeth of the coming of 'Great Birnam Wood to high Dunsinane Hill': I longed to devise a setting in which the trees might really march to war". (Note: Carpenter 2023, #163, footnote, pp. 211–212.) Critics note that it is a shock that the battle, the Orcs, and Saruman's hopes of conquest should end this way. They also observe that it represented Tolkien's wish-fulfilment to reverse the harm he could see being done to the English countryside.

=== The Scouring of the Shire ===
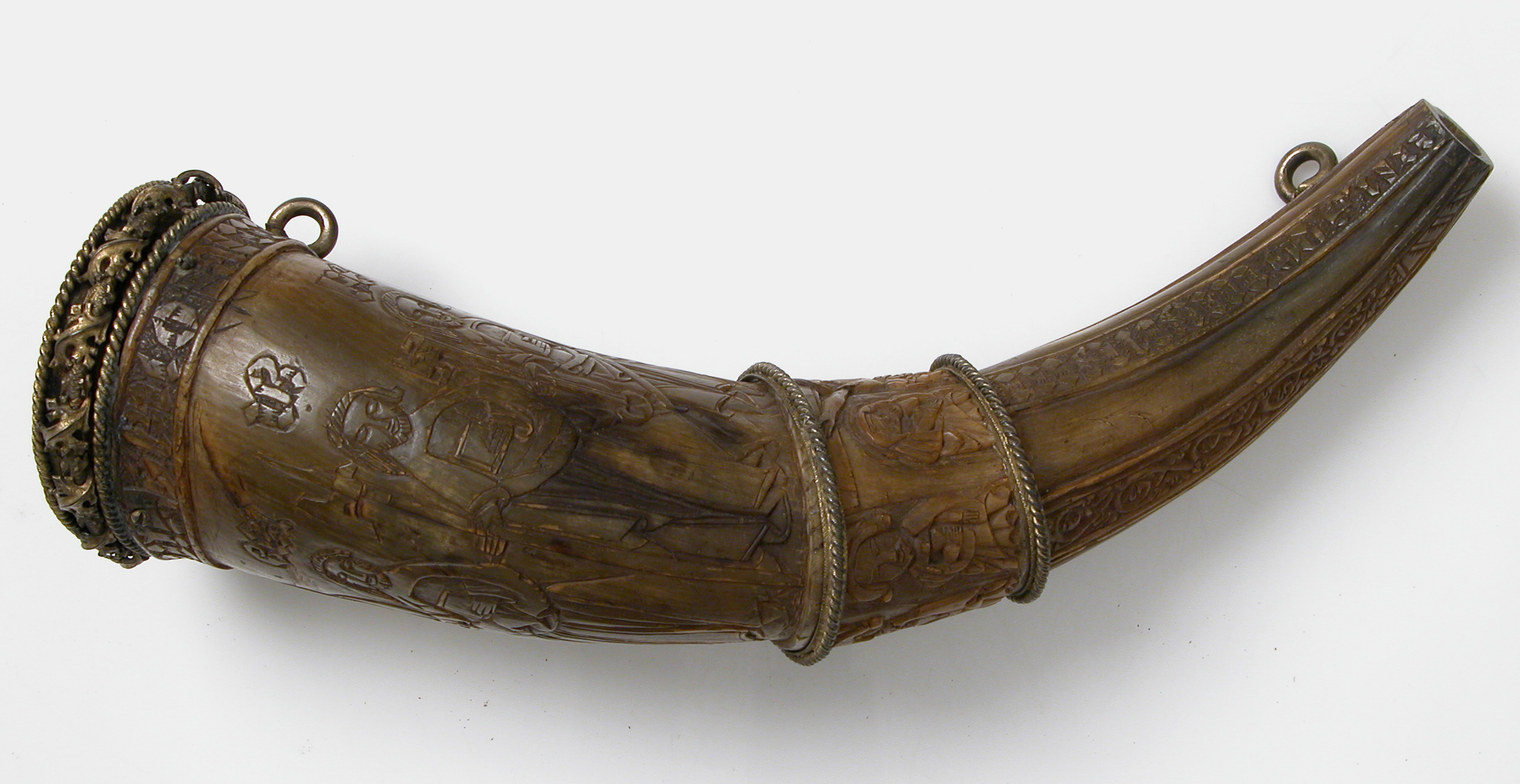
The Tolkien scholar Tom Shippey suggests that Tolkien wished he had the Hobbit Merry's magic horn to rouse people to environmental action in England. Illustrated is a French 15th century hunting horn.

Critics since the 1970s have commented on Tolkien's environmentalism as seen in The Lord of the Rings, especially in the chapter "The Scouring of the Shire". One of the first to note this was Paul H. Kocher, who wrote "Tolkien was an ecologist, champion of the extraordinary, hater of 'progress', lover of handicrafts, detester of war long before such attitudes became fashionable." Nicholas Birns calls the chapter "as much conservationist as it is traditionalist", writing that it presents a strong pro-environmentalist argument in addition to its other themes. Plank describes the chapter's emphasis on the "deterioration of the environment" "quite unusual for its time", with the Hobbits returning to the England-like Shire finding needless destruction of the old and beautiful, and its replacement by the new and ugly; pollution of air and water; neglect; "and above all, trees wantonly destroyed". The chapter has been seen as something of a call to arms, a wish to rouse people to environmental action in their "own backyard".
