= Ent =

Race of tree-giants in The Lord of the Rings

Ents
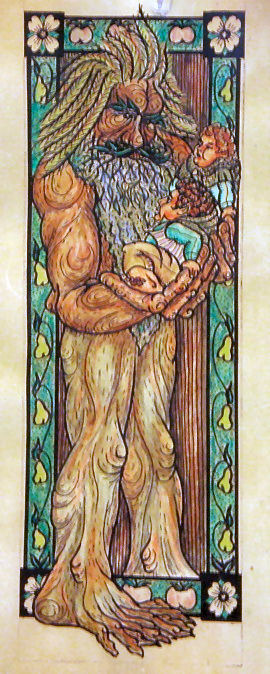
- Treebeard and Hobbits by Tom Loback, 2007

In-universe information
- Other names: Onodrim, Shepherds of the Trees, Tree-folk
- Creation date: First Age
- Home world: Middle-earth
- Base of operations: Fangorn Forest
- Language: Entish
- Leader: Treebeard

Ents are giant humanoids in J. R. R. Tolkien's fantasy world of Middle-earth who closely resemble trees; their leader is Treebeard of Fangorn forest. Their name is derived from an Old English word for "giant".

The Ents appear in The Lord of the Rings as ancient shepherds of the forest and allies of the free peoples of Middle-earth during the War of the Ring. The Ent who figures most prominently in the book is Treebeard, who is called the oldest creature in Middle-earth. At that time, there are no young Ents (Entings) because the Entwives (female Ents) were lost. Akin to Ents are Huorns, whom Treebeard describes as a transitional form of trees which become animated or, conversely, as Ents who grow more "treelike" over time.

Tolkien stated that he was disappointed by Shakespeare's handling of the coming of "Great Birnam Wood to High Dunsinane hill"; he wanted a setting in which the trees would actually go to war. Commentators have seen this as wish-fulfilment, as he disliked the damage being done to the English countryside in his lifetime. Scholars have seen his tale of the Ents as a myth, mostly without analysing it. Corey Olsen interprets the song of the Ents and the Entwives as a myth that warns of the dangers of apathetically isolating oneself in nature, whereas the Ents' song "In the willow-meads of Tasarinan" is a lament.

Inspired by Tolkien and similar traditions, animated or anthropomorphic tree creatures appear in a variety of media and works of fantasy.

== Internal history ==
Treebeard, called by Gandalf the oldest living Ent and the oldest living thing that walks in Middle-earth, (Note: Tolkien 1954, book 3, ch. 5: "The White Rider".) is described as being around 14 feet (4 m) tall, "Man-like, almost Troll-like", and clad in something that might have been tree-bark, with seven toes, a bushy, "almost twiggy" beard and deep penetrating eyes. (Note: Tolkien 1954, book 3, ch. 4: "Treebeard".) Ents vary widely in personal traits (height, heft, colouring, even the number of toes), having come to resemble somewhat the specific types of trees that they shepherded. Quickbeam, for example, guarded rowan trees and bore some resemblance to rowans: tall and slender, smooth-skinned, with ruddy lips and grey-green hair. Some Ents, such as Treebeard, were like

beech-trees or oaks. But there were other kinds. Some recalled the chestnut: brown-skinned Ents with large splayfingered hands, and short thick legs. Some recalled the ash: tall straight grey Ents with many-fingered hands and long legs; some the fir (the tallest Ents), and others the birch, ... and the linden.

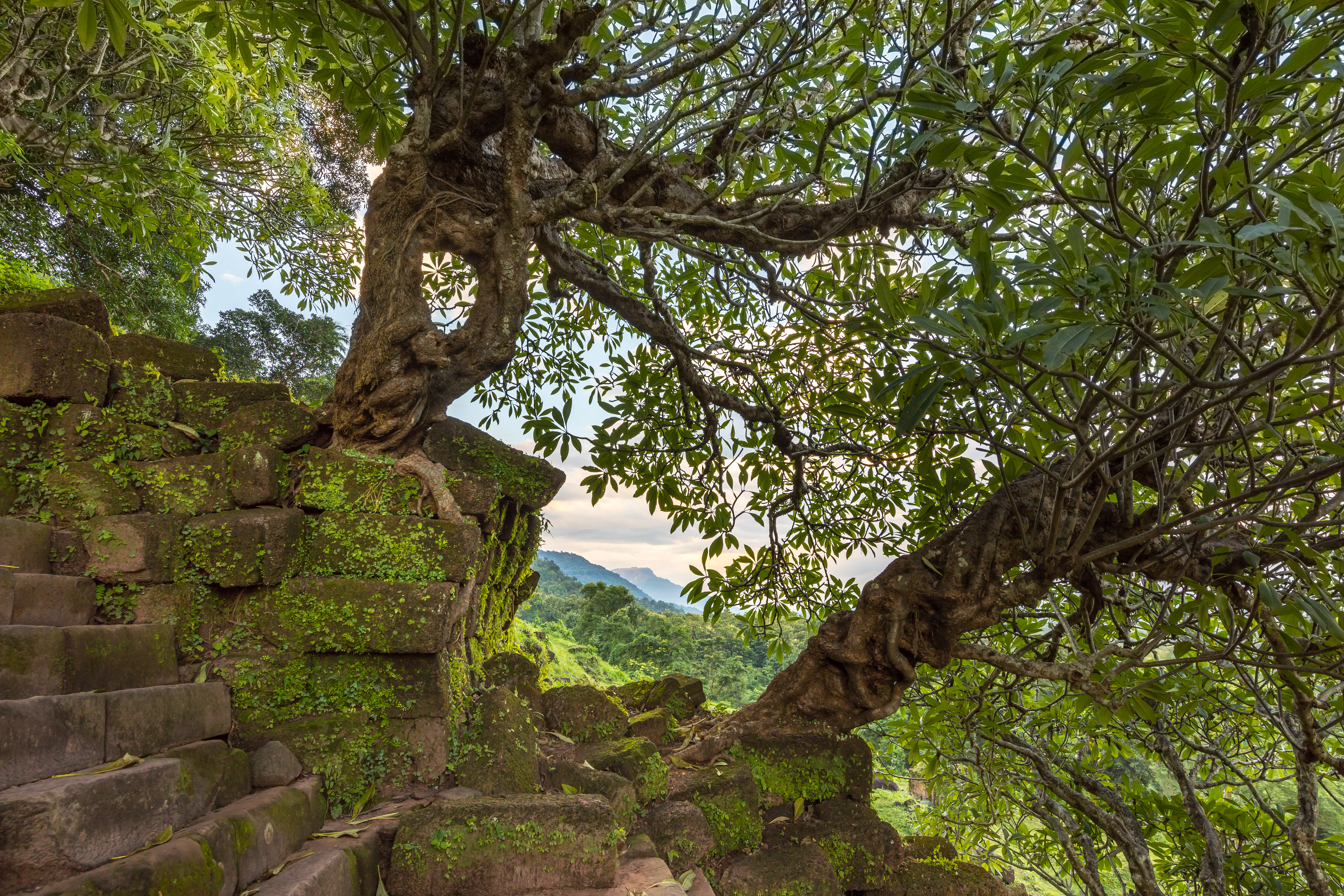
Like the roots of trees, but far more rapidly, Tolkien's Ents could break stone. (Note: Tolkien 1954, book 3, ch. 9: "Flotsam and Jetsam".)

Ents are somewhat treelike, with extraordinarily tough skin; they can erode stone rapidly, but are vulnerable to fire and axe-strokes. They are patient and cautious, with a long sense of time; they considered a three-day deliberation "hasty".

Ents are tall and very strong, capable of tearing apart rock and stone when "roused". Tolkien describes them as tossing great slabs of stone about, and ripping down the walls of Isengard "like bread-crust". Treebeard boasted of their strength to Merry and Pippin; he said that Ents were much more powerful than Trolls, which Morgoth made in the First Age in mockery of Ents, as Orcs were of Elves.

=== First Age ===
Tolkien wrote almost nothing of the early history of the Ents. After the Dwarves were put to sleep by Eru to await the coming of the Elves, the Vala Aulë told his wife Yavanna, "the lover of all things that grow in the earth," (Note: Tolkien 1977, Valaquenta) of the Dwarves. She replied, "They will delve in the earth, and the things that grow and live upon the earth they will not heed. Many a tree shall feel the bite of their iron without pity." (Note: Tolkien 1977, "Quenta Silmarillion" ch. 2: "Of Aulë and Yavanna") She went to Manwë and appealed to him to protect the trees, and they realized that Ents, too, were part of the Song of Creation. Yavanna then warned Aulë, "Now let thy children beware! For there shall walk a power in the forests whose wrath they will arouse at their peril." The Ents are called "the Shepherds of the Trees". Much later, when Beren and a force of Green Elves waylay the force of Dwarves returning from the sack of Doriath, the Dwarves are routed and scatter into the wood, where the Shepherds of the Trees ensure that none escape. (Note: Tolkien 1977, "Quenta Silmarillion", ch. 22 "Of the Ruin of Doriath") Ents did not know how to speak until the Elves taught them. Treebeard said that the Elves "cured us of dumbness", calling that a great gift that could not be forgotten. At that time, much of Eriador was forested; Elrond stated that "a squirrel could go from tree to tree from what is now the Shire to Dunland west of Isengard." (Note: Tolkien 1954a, book 2, ch. 2: "The Council of Elrond".)

=== Entwives ===
The Entwives began to move farther away from the Ents because they liked to plant and control things, while the Ents preferred forests and liked to let things take their natural course. The Entwives moved away to what became the Brown Lands across the Great River Anduin, although the male Ents still visited them. The Entwives interacted with Men and taught them the art of agriculture. The gardens of the Entwives were destroyed by Sauron, and the Entwives disappeared. It was sung by the Elves that one day the Ents and Entwives would find each other. Treebeard indeed implored the Hobbits to send word to him if they had news of the Entwives. (Note: Tolkien 1955, book 6, ch. 6 "Many Partings")

Tolkien spent much time considering the fate of the Entwives, stating in Letters #144: "I think that in fact the Entwives have disappeared for good, being destroyed with their gardens in the War of the Last Alliance...some may have fled east, or even have become enslaved..." (Note: Carpenter 2023, #144 to Naomi Mitchison, 25 April 1954)

After Aragorn is crowned king, he promised Treebeard that the Ents could prosper again and spread to new lands with the threat of Mordor gone, and renew their search for the Entwives. Treebeard lamented that forests may spread but the Ents would not, and he predicted that the few remaining Ents would remain in Fangorn forest and dwindle or become "treeish".

=== The Last March of the Ents ===
The Ents, angry at Saruman for cutting down their trees, convene an Entmoot. They decide to march on Saruman's fortress at Isengard - 'the last march of the Ents'. Led by Treebeard and accompanied by the hobbits Meriadoc Brandybuck and Peregrin Took, the Ents numbered about 50, plus an army of Huorns. They destroy Isengard, tearing down the wall around it: "If the Great Sea had risen in wrath and fallen on the hills with storm, it could have worked no greater ruin". (Note: Tolkien 1954, book 3, ch. 8: "The Road to Isengard") Saruman is trapped in the tower of Orthanc.

== Analysis ==
=== Etymology ===
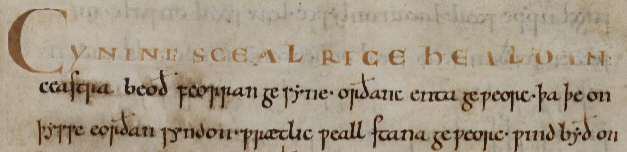
The phrase orðanc enta geƿeorc (orthanc enta geweorc), on the second line of the Old English Maxims II manuscript, seems to have inspired Tolkien.

The word "Ent" is from the Old English ent or eoten, meaning "giant". Tolkien borrowed the word from a phrase in the Anglo-Saxon poems The Ruin and Maxims II, orðanc enta geƿeorc (orthanc enta geweorc, "cunning work of giants"), which describes Roman ruins. (Note: Carpenter 2023, #163 to W. H. Auden, 7 June 1955)

In Sindarin, one of Tolkien's invented Elvish languages, the word for Ent is Onod (plural Enyd). The Sindarin word Onodrim means the Ents as a race. (Note: Tolkien 1980 Index, entries for Ent, Enyd, and Onodrim.)

=== Improving on Shakespeare ===
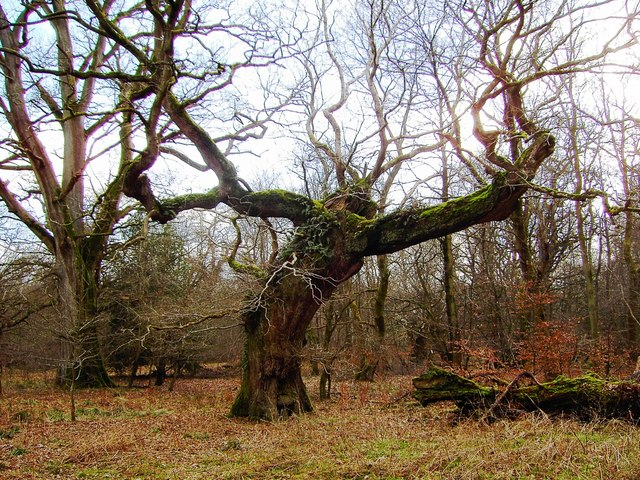
Tolkien wrote that he "longed to devise a setting in which the trees might really march to war", unlike the "shabby" treatment of the story in Shakespeare's Macbeth. (Note: Carpenter 2023, No. 163, footnote, pp. 211–212.)

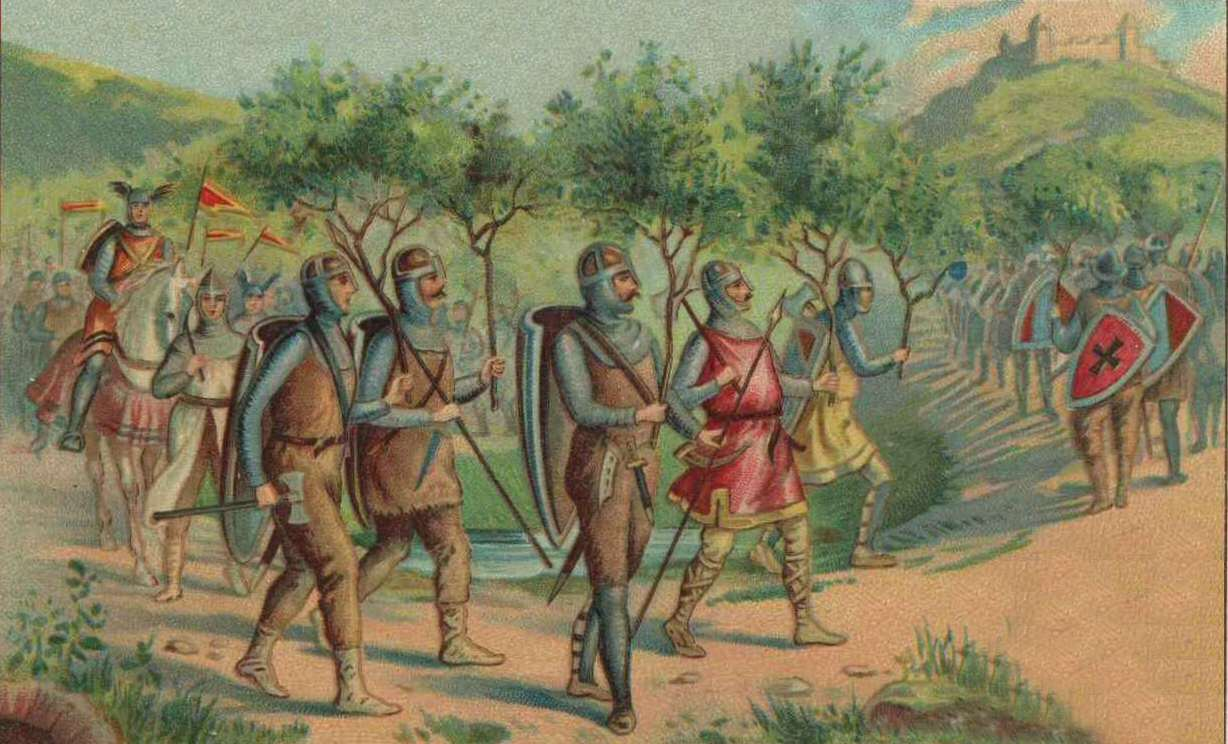
Birnam Wood comes to Dunsinane, in the form of branches carried by the soldiers, as described by Shakespeare.

Tolkien noted in a letter that he had created Ents in response to his "bitter disappointment and disgust from schooldays with the shabby use made in Shakespeare's Macbeth of the coming of 'Great Birnam Wood to high Dunsinane hill': I longed to devise a setting in which the trees might really march to war". The Ents ensured victory at the Battle of Helm's Deep by herding a forest of angry, tree-like Huorns there, to destroy Saruman's army of Orcs. (Note: Tolkien 1954, book 3, ch. 7 "Helm's Deep")

=== Other sources ===
Nick Groom suggests some other possible sources, besides Shakespeare. The Gospel of Mark has the speech by a man cured of blindness "I see men as trees, walking."(Mark 8:24) Algernon Blackwood's 1912 story "The Man Whom the Trees Loved" suggests that "trees had once been moving things, animal organisms of some sort, that had stood so long feeding, sleeping, dreaming, or something, in the same place, that they had lost the power to get away", which Groom remarks sounds just like Treebeard's account of Ents going "sleepy and 'tree-ish'". He notes, too, Arthur Rackham's drawings with "bristly, twisted, anthropomorphic trees that appear as the guises of Elves and other supernatural beings", while Disney's 1932 Silly Symphony episode Flowers and Trees features trees that walk.

Edward Pettit, writing in Mallorn, notes that the Tolkien scholar Verlyn Flieger linked Treebeard to the Green Knight in the medieval romance Sir Gawain and the Green Knight. Both figures have, Pettit writes, been suspected of being versions of the medieval Green Man, the leafy figure often depicted in sculptures in churches. Old English in addition has trees that speak in the alliterative poem The Dream of the Rood.

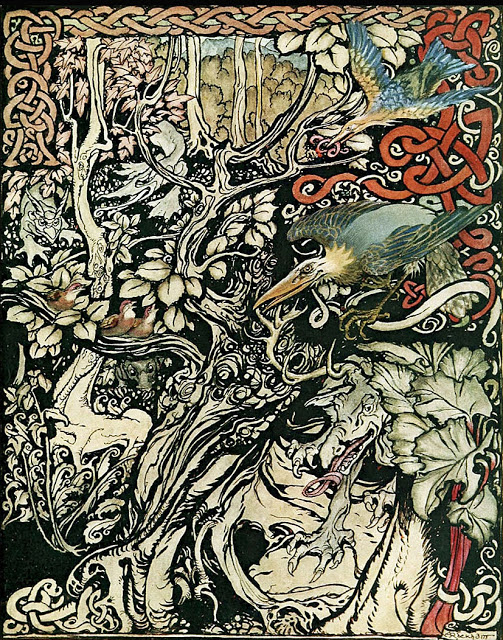
Arthur Rackham's drawings feature twisted trees that suggest supernatural beings.

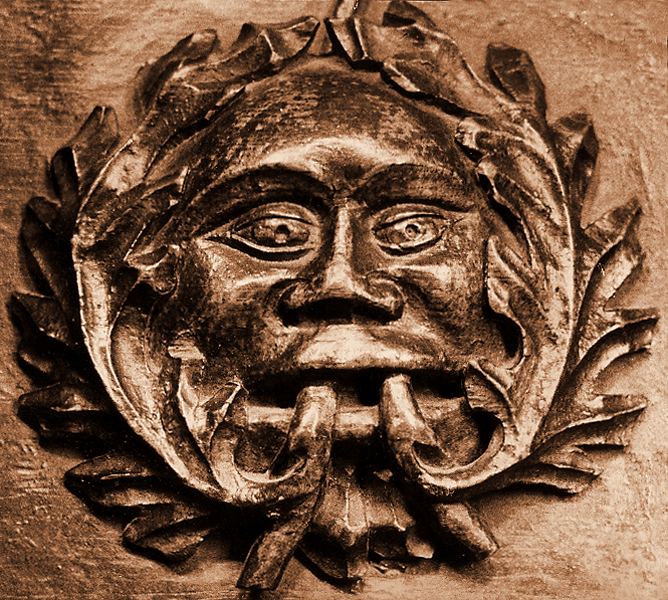
The Ent Treebeard has been thought to be a version of the Green Man, seen here on a medieval misericord in Ludlow.

=== Wish-fulfilment and environmentalism ===
Commentators have observed that having the Ents march to war against the tree-destroyers represented a wish-fulfilment on Tolkien's part, concerned as he was with the increasing damage to the English countryside in the 20th century. In their book Ents, Elves, and Eriador: The Environmental Vision of J.R.R. Tolkien, Matthew T. Dickerson and Jonathan Evans see Treebeard as vocalizing a vital part of Tolkien's environmental ethic, the need to preserve and look after every kind of wild place, especially forests. Corey Olsen however criticises Dickerson and Evans's use of the Ents as "mere symbols".

=== Mythic value: song of the Ents and the Entwives ===
C. S. Lewis described Tolkien's tale of the Ents as a myth, "a story which has a value in itself". Ruth Noel likened the Ents to Germanic legends of "huge, wild, hairy woodsprites".

From the "Song of the Ents and Entwives"

Ent:

When Summer lies upon the world, and in a noon of gold
Beneath the roof of sleeping leaves the dreams of trees unfold,
When woodland halls are green and cool, and wind is in the West,
Come back to me! Come back to me, and say my land is best!

Entwife:

When Summer warms the hanging fruit and burns the berry brown;
When straw is gold, and ear is white, and harvest comes to town;
When honey spills, and apple swells, though wind be in the West,
I'll linger here beneath the Sun, because my land is best!

Olsen sees in Tolkien's song of the Ents and the Entwives, supposedly written by Elves, "compelling insights on the complexities and conflicts of life in a fallen world." The song goes through the four seasons of the year, each time with a stanza by the Ent and then one by the Entwife. Olsen comments that the Ent is passive, even "languid and somnolent" in summer, the only active process being dreaming; whereas the Entwife's summer season is "simply bursting with activity". These are perhaps, Olsen reflects, not in competition; both contemplation and action are "valuable ways of celebrating natural beauty". He suggests that Treebeard's view of the song is however biased, and that the Ent is not as humble as he claims to be, especially with respect to the Entwives. If the Ents and the Entwives were to be "unified", they would "balance and complete each other", but they face "moral dangers" without such balance: in the case of the Ents, the danger is of letting their life in nature "lapse into mere lassitude". He gives as examples the "apathetic isolationism" of Skinbark, who refuses to come out of his hills, and Leaflock's "somnolent oblivion", just standing in the long grass all summer doing nothing. Olsen calls it "a cautionary tale" and "tragic", quite unlike Treebeard's "In the willow-meads of Tasarinan", again covering the four seasons, but which is a lament.

Anne Petty comments that the song follows traditional gender stereotypes, the Ents liking wild nature, the Entwives preferring the more domestic realm of tamed nature and gardening.

== Adaptations ==
=== In other media ===
In Peter Jackson's films The Lord of the Rings: The Two Towers (2002) and The Lord of the Rings: The Return of the King (2003), Treebeard is a combination of a large animatronic model and a CGI construct; he is voiced by John Rhys-Davies, who also portrays Gimli. The Fall of Troy has a song entitled "The Last March of the Ents" on their self-titled debut album released in 2003. Permission was granted for a statue of Treebeard by Tim Tolkien, near his great-uncle J. R. R. Tolkien's former home in Moseley, Birmingham.

The TV series The Lord of the Rings: The Rings of Power, set in the Second Age, features Ents. Two of the Ents that appear in the season two episode "Eldest" are Snaggleroot and Winterbloom (voiced by Jim Broadbent and Olivia Williams).

=== In popular culture ===
A "treant" from World of Warcraft

Ents appeared in the earliest edition of the roleplaying game Dungeons & Dragons in the 1974 white box set, where they were described as tree-like creatures able to command trees, and lawful in nature. In 1975, Elan Merchandising, which owned the game licence to the Tolkien estate, issued a cease-and-desist order regarding the use of the word "ent", so the Dungeons & Dragons creatures were renamed "treants". Heroes of Might and Magic V includes Treants as a part of the Elven alliance; however, due to copyright infringement issues, their look was changed between the beta phase and the retail version, making them quadrupedal.

== See also ==
- List of tree deities
- Sacred trees and groves in Germanic paganism and mythology
- Trees and forests in Middle-earth
- Battle of Droizy
