= Mirkwood =

Fictional forests

Mirkwood is any of several great dark forests in novels by Sir Walter Scott and William Morris in the 19th century, and by J. R. R. Tolkien in the 20th century. The critic Tom Shippey explains that the name evoked the excitement of the wildness of Europe's ancient North.

At least two distinct Middle-earth forests are named Mirkwood in Tolkien's legendarium. One is in the First Age, when the highlands of Dorthonion north of Beleriand became known as Mirkwood after falling under Morgoth's control. The more famous Mirkwood was in Wilderland, east of the river Anduin. It had acquired the name Mirkwood after it fell under the evil influence of the Necromancer in his fortress of Dol Guldur; before that it had been known as Greenwood the Great. This Mirkwood features significantly in The Hobbit and in the film The Hobbit: The Desolation of Smaug.

The term Mirkwood derives from the forest Myrkviðr of Norse mythology; that forest has been identified by scholars as representing a wooded region of Ukraine at the time of the wars between the Goths and the Huns in the fourth century. A Mirkwood was used by Scott in his 1814 novel Waverley, and then by Morris in his 1889 fantasy novel The House of the Wolfings. Forests play a major role in the invented history of Tolkien's Middle-earth and are important in the heroic quests of his characters. The forest device is used as a mysterious transition from one part of the story to another.

== In Walter Scott's Waverley ==
A forest called Mirkwood was used by Walter Scott in his 1814 novel Waverley, which had

a rude and contracted path through the cliffy and woody pass called Mirkwood Dingle, and opened suddenly upon a deep, dark, and small lake, named, from the same cause, Mirkwood-Mere. There stood, in former times, a solitary tower upon a rock almost surrounded by the water ...

== In William Morris's fantasies ==
William Morris used Mirkwood in his fantasy novels. His 1889 The Roots of the Mountains is set in such a forest, while the forest setting in his The House of the Wolfings, also first published in 1889, is actually named Mirkwood. The book begins by describing the wood:

The tale tells that in times long past there was a dwelling of men beside a great wood. Before it lay a plain, not very great, but which was, as it were, an isle in the sea of woodland, since even when you stood on the flat ground, you could see trees everywhere in the offing, though as for hills, you could scarce say that there were any; only swellings-up of the earth here and there, like the upheavings of the water that one sees at whiles going on amidst the eddies of a swift but deep stream.

On either side, to right and left the tree-girdle reached out toward the blue distance, thick close and unsundered ...

In such wise that Folk had made an island amidst of the Mirkwood, and established a home there, and upheld it with manifold toil too long to tell of. And from the beginning this clearing in the wood they called the Mid-mark ...

== In Tolkien's writings ==
A Mirkwood appears in several places in J. R. R. Tolkien's writings, among the numerous forests that play important roles in his storytelling. Projected into Old English, it appears as Myrcwudu in his The Lost Road, as a poem sung by Ælfwine. (Note: Tolkien 1987, King Sheave, 91) He used the name Mirkwood in another unfinished work, The Fall of Arthur. But the name is best known and most prominent in his Middle-earth legendarium, where it appears as two distinct forests, one in the First Age in Beleriand, as described in The Silmarillion, the other in the Third Age in Rhovanion, as described in both The Hobbit and The Lord of the Rings.

Tolkien stated in a 1966 letter that he had not invented the name Mirkwood, but that it was "a very ancient name, weighted with legendary associations", and summarized its "Primitive Germanic" origins, its appearance in "very early German" and in Old English, Old Swedish, and Old Norse, and the survival of mirk (a variant of "murk") in modern English. He wrote that "It seemed to me too good a fortune that Mirkwood remained intelligible (with exactly the right tone) in modern English to pass over: whether mirk is a Norse loan or a freshment of the obsolescent O.E. word." (Note: Carpenter 2023, #289 to Michael George Tolkien, 29 July 1966) He was familiar with Morris's The House of the Wolfings, naming the book as an influence (for instance on the Dead Marshes) in a 1960 letter. (Note: Carpenter 2023, #226 to Professor L. W. Forster, 31 December 1960)

=== The First Age forest in Beleriand ===
In The Silmarillion, the forested highlands of Dorthonion in the north of Beleriand (in the northwest of Middle-earth) eventually fell under Morgoth's control and was subjugated by creatures of Sauron, then Lord of Werewolves. Accordingly, the forest was renamed Taur-nu-Fuin in Sindarin, "Forest of Darkness", or "Forest of Nightshade"; (Note: Tolkien 1977, "Quenta Silmarillion: Of the Ruin of Beleriand and the Fall of Fingolfin") Tolkien chose to use the English form "Mirkwood". Beren becomes the sole survivor of the men who once lived there as subjects of the Noldor King Finrod of Nargothrond. Beren ultimately escapes the terrible forest that even the Orcs fear to spend time in. (Note: Tolkien 1985, p. 36, "but dread they know of the Deadly Nightshade and in haste only do they hie that way.") Beleg pursues the captors of Túrin through this forest in the several accounts of Túrin's tale. Along with the rest of Beleriand, this forest was lost in the cataclysm of the War of Wrath at the end of the First Age. (Note: Tolkien 1977, Index entry "Beleriand": "Beleriand was broken in the turmoils at the end of the First Age, and invaded by the sea, so that only Ossiriand (Lindon) remained." See pages 120-124, 252, 285-286)

=== The forest in Rhovanion ===
Imagemap with clickable links of the north-west of Middle-earth at the end of the Third Age. Mirkwood is to the east of the Misty Mountains.

Mirkwood is a vast temperate broadleaf and mixed forest in the Middle-earth region of Rhovanion (Wilderland), east of the great river Anduin. In The Hobbit, the wizard Gandalf calls it "the greatest forest of the Northern world." (Note: Tolkien 1937, ch. 7 "Queer Lodgings") Before it was darkened by evil, it had been called Greenwood the Great. (Note: Tolkien 1977, "Of the Rings of Power and the Third Age") Tolkien charted Mirkwood in Thror's Map and the Map of Wilderland, which formed endleaves to The Hobbit. Within the text, an ink illustration captioned 'The Elvenking's Gate' depicts the entrance to King Thranduil's kingdom.

After the publication of the maps in The Lord of the Rings, Tolkien wrote a correction stating "Mirkwood is too small on map it must be 300 miles across" from east to west, but the maps were never altered to reflect this. On the published maps, Mirkwood was up to 200 miles (320 km) across; from north to south it stretched about 420 miles (680 km). (Note: Tolkien 1954a and Tolkien 1954, fold-out maps) The J. R. R. Tolkien Encyclopedia states that it is 400–500 miles (640–800 km) long and 200 miles (320 km) wide.

The trees were large and densely packed. In the north they were mainly oaks, although beeches predominated in the areas favoured by Elves. Higher elevations in southern Mirkwood were "clad in a forest of dark fir". (Note: Tolkien 1954a, book 2 ch. 6 "Lothlórien") Pockets of the forest were dominated by dangerous giant spiders. (Note: Tolkien 1954, book 4, ch. 9 "Shelob's Lair") Animals within the forest were described as inedible. (Note: Tolkien 1937, ch. 8, "Flies and Spiders") The elves of the forest, too, are "black" and hostile, drawing a comparison with Svartalfheim ("Black elf home") in Snorri Sturluson's Old Norse Edda, quite unlike the friendly elves of Rivendell.

Near the end of the Third Age – the period in which The Hobbit and The Lord of the Rings are set – the expansive forest of "Greenwood the Great" was renamed "Mirkwood", supposedly a translation of an unknown Westron name. The forest plays little part in The Lord of the Rings, but is important in The Hobbit for both atmosphere and plot. It was renamed when "the shadow of Dol Guldur", namely the power of Sauron, fell upon the forest, and people began to call it Taur-nu-Fuin (Sindarin: "forest under deadly nightshade" or "forest under night", i.e. "mirk wood") and Taur-e-Ndaedelos (Sindarin: "forest of great fear"). The White Council flushes Sauron out of his forest tower at Dol Guldur, and as he flees to Mordor his influence in Mirkwood diminishes. (Note: Tolkien 1954a, book 2, ch. 2 "The Council of Elrond")

In The Hobbit, Bilbo Baggins, with Thorin Oakenshield and his band of Dwarves, attempt to cross Mirkwood during their quest to regain their mountain Erebor and its treasure from Smaug the dragon. One of the Dwarves, the fat Bombur, falls into the Enchanted River and has to be carried, unconscious, for the following days. Losing the Elf-path, the party becomes lost in the forest and is captured by giant spiders. They escape, only to be taken prisoner by King Thranduil's Wood-Elves. (Note: Tolkien 1937, ch. 9 "Barrels Out of Bond")

Years later, Gollum, after his release from Mordor, is captured by Aragorn and brought as a prisoner to Thranduil's realm. Out of pity, they allow him to roam the forest under close guard, but he escapes during an Orc raid. After the downfall of Sauron, Mirkwood is cleansed by the elf-queen Galadriel and renamed Eryn Lasgalen, Sindarin for "Wood of Greenleaves". Thranduil's son, Legolas, leaves Mirkwood for Ithilien. (Note: Tolkien 1955 book 6 ch. 4, and Appendix B "Later Events") The wizard Radagast lived at Rhosgobel on the western eaves of Mirkwood, as depicted in the film The Hobbit: An Unexpected Journey.

==== Dol Guldur ====
Dol Guldur (Sindarin: "Hill of Sorcery") (Note: The Silmarillion, Index, p. 324.) was Sauron's stronghold in Mirkwood, before he returned to Barad-dûr in Mordor. It is first mentioned (as "the dungeons of the Necromancer") in The Hobbit. (Note: The Hobbit, "An Unexpected Party", p. 34.) The hill itself, rocky and barren, was the highest point in the southwestern part of the forest. Before Sauron's occupation, it was called Amon Lanc ("Naked Hill" (Note: Unfinished Tales, Index, p. 418.)). (Note: Unfinished Tales, "Disaster of the Gladden Fields", p. 280, note 12.) It lay near the western edge of the forest, across the Anduin from Lothlórien. (Note: The Fellowship of the Ring, "Lothlórien", p. 366.) Tolkien suggests that Sauron settled on Dol Guldur as the focus for his rise during the period before the War of the Ring in part so that he could search for the One Ring in the Gladden Fields just up the river. (Note: See for example, The Silmarillion, "Of the Rings of Power and the Third Age", p. 302.)

== Literary philology ==
Possible location of Mirkwood in the 4th-century Goth–Hun borderlands between the Carpathian Mountains and the River Dnieper, both mentioned in Norse legend. The arrows indicate the movement of the peoples after meeting.

19th-century writers interested in philology, including the folklorist Jacob Grimm and the artist and fantasy writer William Morris, speculated romantically about the wild, primitive Northern forest, the Myrkviðr inn ókunni ("the pathless Mirkwood") and the secret roads across it, in the hope of reconstructing supposed ancient cultures. Grimm proposed that the name Myrkviðr derived from Old Norse mark (boundary) and mǫrk (forest), both, he supposed, from an older word for wood, perhaps at the dangerous and disputed boundary of the kingdoms of the Huns and the Goths.

Morris's Mirkwood is named in his 1899 fantasy novel House of the Wolfings, and a similar large dark forest is the setting in The Roots of the Mountains, again marking a dark and dangerous forest. Tolkien had access to more modern philology than Grimm, with proto-Indo-European mer- (to flicker [dimly]) and *merg- (mark, boundary), and places the early origins of both the Men of Rohan and the hobbits in his Mirkwood. The Tolkien Encyclopedia remarks also that the Old English Beowulf mentions that the path between the worlds of men and monsters, from Hrothgar's hall to Grendel's lair, runs ofer myrcan mor (across a gloomy moor) and wynleasne wudu (a joyless wood).

A Mirkwood is mentioned in multiple Norse texts including Sögubrot af nokkrum fornkonungum, Helgakviða Hundingsbana I and II, Styrbjarnar þáttr Svíakappa, and Völundarkviða; these mentions may have denoted different forests. The Goths had lived in Ukraine until the attack by the Huns in the 370s, when they moved southwest and with the permission of the Emperor Valens settled in the Roman Empire. The scholar Omeljan Pritsak identifies the Mirkwood of Hlöðskviða in Hervarar saga with what would later be called the "dark blue forest" (Goluboj lěsь) and the "black forest" (Černyj lěsь) north of the Ukrainian steppe.

Tom Shippey noted that Norse legend yields two placenames which would place the Myrkviðr in the borderlands between the Goths and the Huns of the 4th century. The Atlakviða ("The Lay of Atli", in the Elder Edda) and the Hlöðskviða ("The Battle of the Goths and Huns", in Hervarar saga ok Heiðreks) both mention that the Mirkwood was beside the Danpar, the River Dnieper, which runs through Ukraine to the Black Sea. The Hlöðskviða states explicitly in the same passage that the Mirkwood was in Gothland. The Hervarar saga also mentions Harvaða fjöllum, "the Harvad fells", which by Grimm's Law would be *Karpat, the Carpathian Mountains, an identification on which most scholars have long agreed.

== Influence ==
=== Mirkwood ===
Tolkien's estate disputed the right of the Tolkien fan fiction author Steve Hillard "to use the name and personality of J. R. R. Tolkien in the novel" Mirkwood: A Novel About J. R. R. Tolkien. The dispute was settled in May 2011, requiring the printing of a disclaimer. A rock music group named Mirkwood was formed in 1971; their first album in 1973 had the same name. A different band in California used the name in 2005.

Tolkien's forests were the subject of a programme on BBC Radio 3, with Eleanor Rosamund Barraclough and the folk singer Mark Atherton. Literary holidays in the Forest of Dean have been sold on the basis that the area inspired Tolkien, who often went there, to create Mirkwood and other forests in his books.

=== Dol Guldur ===
Dol Guldur has been featured in many game adaptations of The Lord of the Rings, including the Iron Crown Enterprises portrayal, which contains scenarios and adventures for the Middle-earth Role Playing game. In the strategy battle game The Lord of the Rings: The Battle for Middle-earth II, Dol Guldur appears as an iconic building. The campaign-scenario called "Assault on Dol Guldur" appears as the final part of the good campaign. Several portrayals of Dol Guldur are included in the Games Workshop game The Lord of the Rings Strategy Battle Game, appearing prominently in the "Fall of the Necromancer". Several enemies are listed, including Spider Queens, Castellans of Dol Guldur, Sauron the Necromancer, Wild Warg Chieftain, and their respective armies. Giant Bats are also included in the game. In 1996, the black metal band Summoning released a music album named Dol Guldur.

The Canadian artist John Howe has portrayed Dol Guldur in sketches and drawings for Electronic Arts. In Myth and Magic: The Art of John Howe, Howe includes Dol Guldur among Middle-earth fortresses. Howe created many drawings for Peter Jackson during the filming of the Lord of the Rings trilogy, worked for Tolkien Enterprises, and drew for Iron Crown Enterprises' collectable Middle-earth card game, which mentions Dol Guldur on Gandalf's card. Mirkwood was added to the MMORPG The Lord of the Rings Online: Shadows of Angmar in the 2009 expansion pack Siege of Mirkwood. The storyline depicts a small Elven assault upon Dol Guldur.

In Peter Jackson's 2012–2014 film trilogy adaptation of The Hobbit, Dol Guldur is depicted as a massive overgrown castle in ruins. According to Alan Lee and John Howe, the concept artists, this was used to give the impression that the fortress had been built by Númenóreans during the Second Age, only to fall into ruin when Númenór's power waned. Adrián Maldonado of AlmostArchaeology speculates that the derelict castle could be interpreted by viewers as the ruins of Oropher's halls, erected during the Second Age when he ruled Greenwood the Great from Amon Lanc.
