= Mordor =

Evil land in J. R. R. Tolkien's Middle-earth legendarium

- Middle-earth location
- Mount Doom (left, in the distance) and a door on the eastern side of Barad-dûr (right) as drawn by J. R. R. Tolkien in an illustration used in the 1973 J.R.R. Tolkien Calendar.
- First appearance: The Lord of the Rings

In-universe information
- Other names: the Land of Shadow, the Black Land, the Dark Land
- Geography: East of Gondor
- Lifespan: First Age – Third Age
- Capital: Barad-dûr

In J. R. R. Tolkien's fictional continent of Middle-earth, Mordor (Quenya: [ˈmɔrdɔr]; Sindarin for 'Black Land', Quenya for 'Land of Shadow') is the realm of the Dark Lord Sauron. It lay to the east of Gondor and the great river Anduin, and to the south of Mirkwood. Within Mordor lies Mount Doom (Sindarin: Orodruin, "Fire Mountain"; also Amon Amarth, "Mount Doom"), the volcano central to the destruction of the One Ring. Mordor was surrounded by three mountain ranges, to the north, the west, and the south. These both protected the land from invasion and kept those living in Mordor from escaping.

Commentators have noted that Mordor was influenced by Tolkien's own experiences in the industrial Black Country of the English Midlands, and by his time fighting in the trenches of the Western Front in the First World War. Tolkien was also familiar with the account of the monster Grendel's unearthly landscapes in the Old English poem Beowulf. Others have observed that Tolkien depicts Mordor as specifically evil, and as a vision of industrial environmental degradation, contrasted with either the homely Shire or the beautiful elvish forest of Lothlórien.

== Geography ==
=== Overview ===
Mordor was roughly rectangular in shape, with the longer sides on the north and south. Three sides were defended by mountain ranges: the Ered Lithui ("Ash Mountains") on the north, and the Ephel Dúath ("Mountains of Shadow") on the west and south. The lengths of these ranges are estimated to be 498, 283 and 501 miles (801, 455 and 806 kilometres) respectively, which gives Mordor an area of roughly 140,000 square miles (360,000 square kilometres).

To the west lay the narrow land of Ithilien, a province of Gondor; (Note: Tolkien 1954, book 4, ch. 7 "Journey to the Cross-Roads") to the northwest, the Dead Marshes and Dagorlad, the Battle Plain; to the north, Wilderland; to the northeast and east, Rhûn; to the southeast, Khand; and to the south, Harad. (Note: Tolkien 1955, Map of Rohan, Gondor, and Mordor) Not far from the Dead Marshes is another dismal swamp, the Nindalf or Wetwang, beside the Emyn Muil hills.

=== The Black Gate ===
In the northwest, the pass of Cirith Gorgor led into the enclosed plain of Udûn. Sauron built the Black Gate of Mordor (the Morannon) across the pass. This added to the earlier fortifications, the Towers of the Teeth – Carchost to the east, Narchost to the west, guard towers which had been built by Gondor to keep a watch on this entrance. (Note: Tolkien 1954, book 4, ch. 3 "The Black Gate is Closed") The passage through the inner side of Udûn into the interior of Mordor was guarded by another gate, the Isenmouthe. Outside the Morannon lay the Dagorlad or Battle Plain, and the Dead Marshes.

=== The Mountains of Shadow ===
The Ephel Dúath ("Fence of Shadow") defended Mordor on the west and south. The main pass was guarded by Minas Morgul, a city built by Gondor as Minas Ithil. (Note: Tolkien 1954, book 4, ch. 8 "The Stairs of Cirith Ungol") The fortress Durthang lay in the northern Ephel Dúath above Udûn. (Note: Tolkien 1955, book 6, ch. 2 "The Land of Shadow") A higher, more difficult pass, Cirith Ungol, lay just to the north of the Morgul pass. Its top was guarded by a tower, built by Gondor. The route traversed Torech Ungol, the lair of the giant spider Shelob. (Note: Tolkien 1954, book 4, ch. 9 "Shelob's Lair") (Note: Tolkien 1955, book 6, ch. 1 "The Tower of Cirith Ungol")

Inside the Ephel Dúath ran a lower parallel ridge, the Morgai, separated by a narrow valley, a "dying land not yet dead" with "low scrubby trees", "coarse grey grass-tussocks", "withered mosses", "great writhing, tangled brambles", and thickets of briars with long, stabbing thorns. (Note: Tolkien 1955, book 6, ch. 2 "The Land of Shadow")

=== Interior ===
The interior of Mordor was composed of three large regions. The core of Sauron's realm was in the northwest: the arid plateau of Gorgoroth, with the active volcano Mount Doom located in the middle. (Note: Tolkien 1955, book 6, ch. 4 "The Field of Cormallen") Sauron's main fortress Barad-dûr was on the north side of Gorgoroth, at the end of a spur of the Ash Mountains. Gorgoroth was volcanic and inhospitable to life, but home to Mordor's mines, forges, and garrisons. Núrn, the southern part of Mordor, was less arid and more fertile; Sauron's slaves farmed this region to support his armies, (Note: Tolkien 1955, book 6, ch. 5 "The Steward and the King") and streams fed the salt Sea of Núrnen. To the east of Gorgoroth lay the dry plain of Lithlad.

=== Mount Doom ===
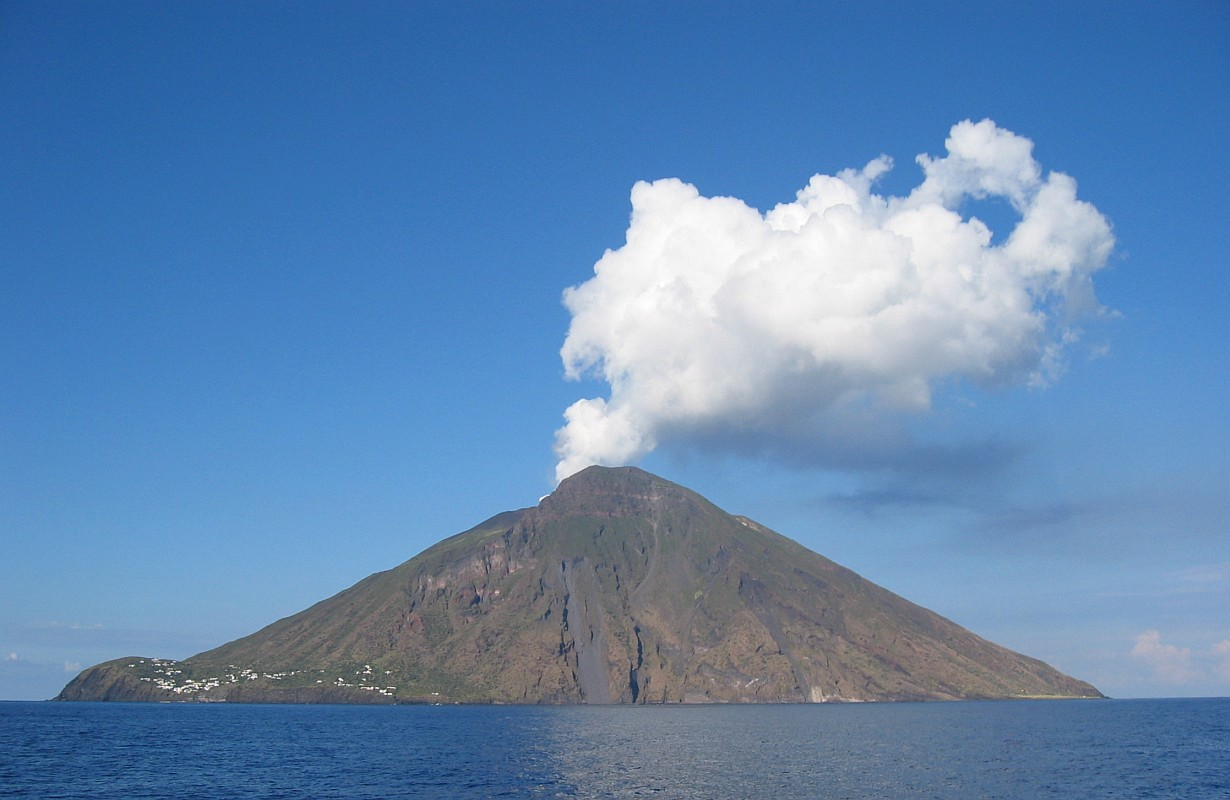
Tolkien identified the volcano of Stromboli off Sicily with Mount Doom.

Mount Doom (in Sindarin: Amon Amarth (Note: Tolkien 1977, Index "Amon Amarth")) or Orodruin ("Mountain of Blazing Fire" (Note: Tolkien 1977, Index "Orodruin")) is more than an ordinary volcano; it responds to Sauron's commands and his presence, lapsing into dormancy when he is away from Mordor, and becoming active again when he returns. It is the place where the One Ring was forged, and its magma heart is the only place where it can be destroyed. (Note: Tolkien 1954a, Book 1, ch. 2 "The Shadow of the Past") When Sauron is defeated at the end of the Third Age with the destruction of the One Ring, the volcano erupts violently.

Tolkien stated in his "Guide to the Names in The Lord of the Rings", intended to assist translators, that the phrase "Crack of Doom" derives from William Shakespeare's play Macbeth, Act 4 scene 1. Tolkien wrote that the phrase meant "the announcement of the Last Day" by a crack of thunder, or "the sound of the last trump[et]" (he cites the use of "crack" to mean a trumpet's sound in Sir Gawain and the Green Knight at lines 116 and 1166) at the Last Judgment as described in the Book of Revelation. He further states that "Doom" originally meant "judgement", and by its sound and its use in the word "doomsday" carries the "senses of death, finality, and fate". Another possible source of the name, mentioned by Tolkien and discussed by the Tolkien scholar Jared Lobdell, is a pair of tales of supernatural events by the English novelist Algernon Blackwood, "The Willows" and "The Glamour of the Snow". According to the fanzine Niekas, Tolkien "more or less found Mordor" on a Mediterranean cruise in September 1966. When sailing past the volcano of Stromboli at night, Tolkien said he had "never seen anything that looked so much like [Mount Doom]."

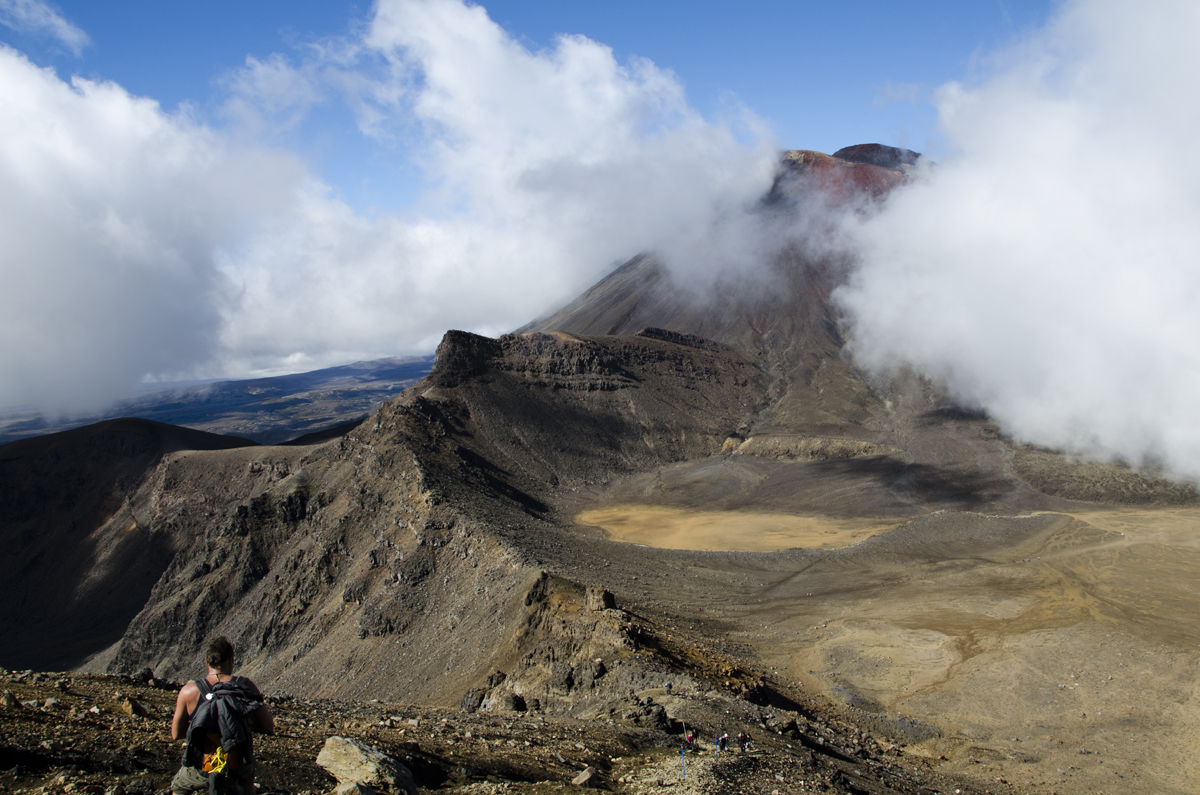
Mount Ngauruhoe was Peter Jackson's inspiration for the Mount Doom in his films.

In Peter Jackson's film adaptation of The Lord of the Rings, Mount Doom was represented by two active volcanoes in New Zealand: Mount Ngauruhoe and Mount Ruapehu, located in Tongariro National Park. In long shots, the mountain is either a large model or a CGI effect, or a combination. The production was not permitted to film the summit of Ngauruhoe because the Māori hold it to be sacred, but some scenes on the slopes of Mount Doom were filmed on the slopes of Ruapehu.

=== Barad-dûr ===
The name Barad-dûr is Sindarin, from barad "tower" and dûr "dark". It was called Lugbúrz in the Black Speech of Mordor, from lug "tower" and búrz "dark". The Black Speech (created by Sauron) was one of the languages used in Barad-dûr. The soldiers there used a debased form of the tongue. (Note: Tolkien 1955, Appendix F) In The Lord of the Rings "Barad-dûr," "Lugbúrz," and "the Dark Tower" are occasionally used as metonyms for Sauron. (Note: Tolkien 1955, Index: III "Persons, Places, and Things")

In the Second Age, Sauron began to stir again and chose Mordor as a stronghold in which to build his fortress. It was strengthened by the power of the One Ring, which had recently been forged; its foundations would survive as long as the Ring existed. Gandalf described the Ring as being the "...foundation of Barad-dûr..." (Note: Tolkien 1955, "The Last Debate") The Dark Tower is described as being composed of iron, being black and having battlements and gates. (Note: Tolkien 1954a, Book 2, ch. 10 "The Breaking of the Fellowship") In a painting by Tolkien, however, the walls are of mainly grey stone and brick, and battlements, gates and towers are not visible. (Note: Tolkien 1979, Plate 30: Orodruin and Barad-dûr)

In The Two Towers, Barad-dûr is described as "...that vast fortress, armoury, prison, furnace of great power..." (Note: Tolkien 1954, "The Road to Isengard") The same paragraph goes on to say the Dark Tower had 'immeasurable strength'. The fortress was constructed with many towers and was hidden in clouds about it: "...rising black, blacker and darker than the vast shades amid which it stood, the cruel pinnacles and iron crown of the topmost tower of Barad-dûr." (Note: Tolkien 1955, "Mount Doom") The structure could not be clearly seen because Sauron created shadows about himself that crept out from the tower. In Frodo's vision on Amon Hen, he perceived the immense tower as "...wall upon wall, battlement upon battlement, black, immeasurably strong, mountain of iron, gate of steel, tower of adamant... Barad-dûr, Fortress of Sauron." There was a look-out post, the "Window of the Eye", at the top of the tower. This window was visible from Mount Doom where Frodo and Sam had a terrible glimpse of the Eye of Sauron. Barad-dûr's west gate is described as "huge" and the west bridge as "a vast bridge of iron."

In The Return of the King, Sam Gamgee witnessed the destruction of Barad-dûr: "... towers and battlements, tall as hills, founded upon a mighty mountain-throne above immeasurable pits; great courts and dungeons, eyeless prisons sheer as cliffs, and gaping gates of steel and adamant..."

Barad-dûr, along with the One Ring, Mordor, and Sauron himself, were destroyed on 25 March, a traditional Anglo-Saxon date for the crucifixion; the quest to destroy the One Ring began in Rivendell on 25 December, the date of Christmas.

=== First Age ===
In The Atlas of Middle-earth, the cartographer Karen Wynn Fonstad assumed that the lands of Mordor, Khand, and Rhûn lay where the inland Sea of Helcar had been, and that the Sea of Rhûn and Sea of Núrnen were its remnants. This was based on a First Age world-map drawn by Tolkien in the Ambarkanta, where the Inland Sea of Helcar occupied a large area of Middle-earth between the Ered Luin and Orocarni, its western end being close to the head of the Great Gulf (later the Mouths of Anduin). (Note: The atlas was published before The Peoples of Middle-earth (1996), in which the Sea of Rhûn exists already in the First Age. (Note: Tolkien 1996, p. 373, note 13))

== History ==
=== Early history ===
Sauron settled in Mordor in the Second Age of Middle-earth, and it remained the pivot of his evil contemplations. He built his great stronghold Barad-dûr, the Dark Tower, near the volcano Mount Doom (Orodruin), and became known as the Dark Lord of Mordor. Sauron aided the elves in the creation of the Rings of Power in Eregion in Eriador, and secretly forged the One Ring in Orodruin. He then set about conquering Middle-earth, launching an attack upon the Elves of Eregion, but was repelled by the Men of Númenor. (Note: Tolkien 1977, "Of the Rings of Power and the Third Age")

Over a thousand years later, the Númenóreans under Ar-Pharazôn sailed to Middle-earth to challenge Sauron's claim to be "King of Men". Sauron let them capture him and take him back to Númenor, where he caused its destruction. He at once returned to Mordor as a spirit and resumed his rule. (Note: Tolkien 1977, Akallabêth)

=== The Last Alliance and Third Age ===
Sauron's rule was interrupted again when his efforts to overthrow the surviving Men of Númenor and the Elves failed. The army of the Last Alliance of Elves and Men advanced on Mordor; in a great battle on the Dagorlad ("Battle Plain"), Sauron's forces were destroyed and the Black Gate was stormed. Barad-dûr was then besieged; after seven years, Sauron broke out and was defeated on the slopes of Orodruin. Sauron fled into Rhûn, and Barad-dûr was levelled. Gondor built fortresses at the entrances to Mordor to prevent his return, maintaining the "Watchful Peace" for over a thousand years.

The Great Plague in Gondor caused the fortifications guarding Mordor to be abandoned, and Mordor again filled with evil things. The Ringwraiths took advantage of Gondor's decline to re-enter Mordor, conquered Minas Ithil, and took over the fortresses. At the time of Bilbo Baggins's quest in The Hobbit, Sauron returned into Mordor from Dol Guldur, feigning defeat, but readying for war.

=== War of the Ring ===
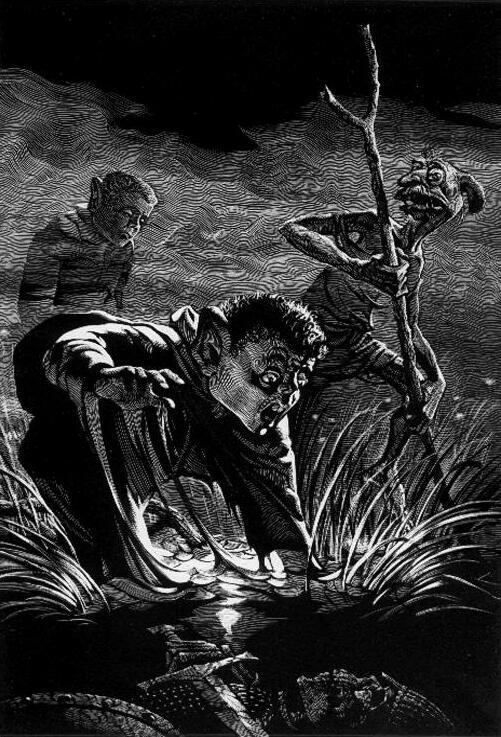
Frodo and Sam guided by Gollum through the Dead Marshes. Scraperboard illustration by Alexander Korotich, 1984

The Council of Elrond decided to send the Ring to Mount Doom to destroy it and Sauron's power. It was carried into Mordor by two Hobbits, Frodo Baggins and Sam Gamgee; they approached via the Dead Marshes, and entered by the pass of Cirith Ungol. In the War of the Ring, Sauron attempted to storm Minas Tirith, the capital of Gondor, but was defeated by Gondor and Rohan in the Battle of the Pelennor Fields. The victors sent an army to the Black Gate to distract Sauron from the Ring. He responded by emptying Mordor of its armies, sending them to the Black Gate. As a result, the plain of Gorgoroth was left almost deserted and Frodo and Sam were able to travel across it to Mount Doom. During the Battle of the Morannon, the One Ring was destroyed in Mount Doom, along with Sauron's power, Barad-dûr, and the morale of his armies. This ultimate defeat of Sauron ended the Third Age. Gorgoroth became empty as its Orcs fled or were killed. The land of Núrn was given to Sauron's freed slaves.

== Languages and peoples ==
At the time of the War of the Ring, Sauron had gathered great armies to serve him. These included Easterlings and Haradrim, who spoke a variety of tongues, and Orcs and Trolls, who usually spoke a debased form of the Common Speech. Within Barad-dûr and among the captains of Mordor (the Ringwraiths and other high-ranking servants such as the Mouth of Sauron), the Black Speech was still used, the language devised by Sauron during the Dark Years of the Second Age. In addition to ordinary Orcs and Trolls, Sauron had bred a more powerful strain of Orcs, the Uruk-hai, and a strong and agile breed of Trolls, the Olog-hai, who could endure the sun. The Olog-hai knew only the Black Speech. (Note: Tolkien 1955, Appendix F, "The Languages and Peoples of the Third Age")

== Naming ==
Within Tolkien's fiction, "Mordor" had two meanings: "Black Land" in Sindarin, and "Land of Shadow" in Quenya. The root mor ("dark", "black") also appeared in Moria, which meant "Black Pit", and Morgoth, the first Dark Lord. (Note: Carpenter 2023, #297 to Mr. Rang, draft, August 1967)

Popular sources have conjectured or stated directly that "Mordor" came from Old English morðor, "mortal sin" or "murder". Against this, the philologist Helge Fauskanger notes that Tolkien had been using both the elements of the name, "mor" and "dor" (as in Gondor, Eriador) for decades before assembling them into "Mordor".

Fauskanger writes that there are however several words that sound like "mor" with connotations of darkness. Italian moro (cf. Latin maurus, black, and Mauri, a North African tribe) means a Moor, and the adjective means "black"; Tolkien said that he liked the Italian language. Greek Μαυρός (mauros) means "dark, dim". He notes, too, the possible connection in Tolkien's mind with Mirkwood, the dark Northern forest, from Norse myrk "dark", cognate with English "murky". He adds that words like "Latin mors 'death' or Old English morðor 'murder'—further darkened the ring of this syllable." Finally, Fauskanger mentions the Arthurian names like Morgana, Morgause, and Mordred; the Mor- element here does not mean "dark", possibly being connected to Welsh mawr "big", but Tolkien could have picked up the association with Arthurian evil.

== Origins ==
=== Grendel's wilderness in Beowulf ===
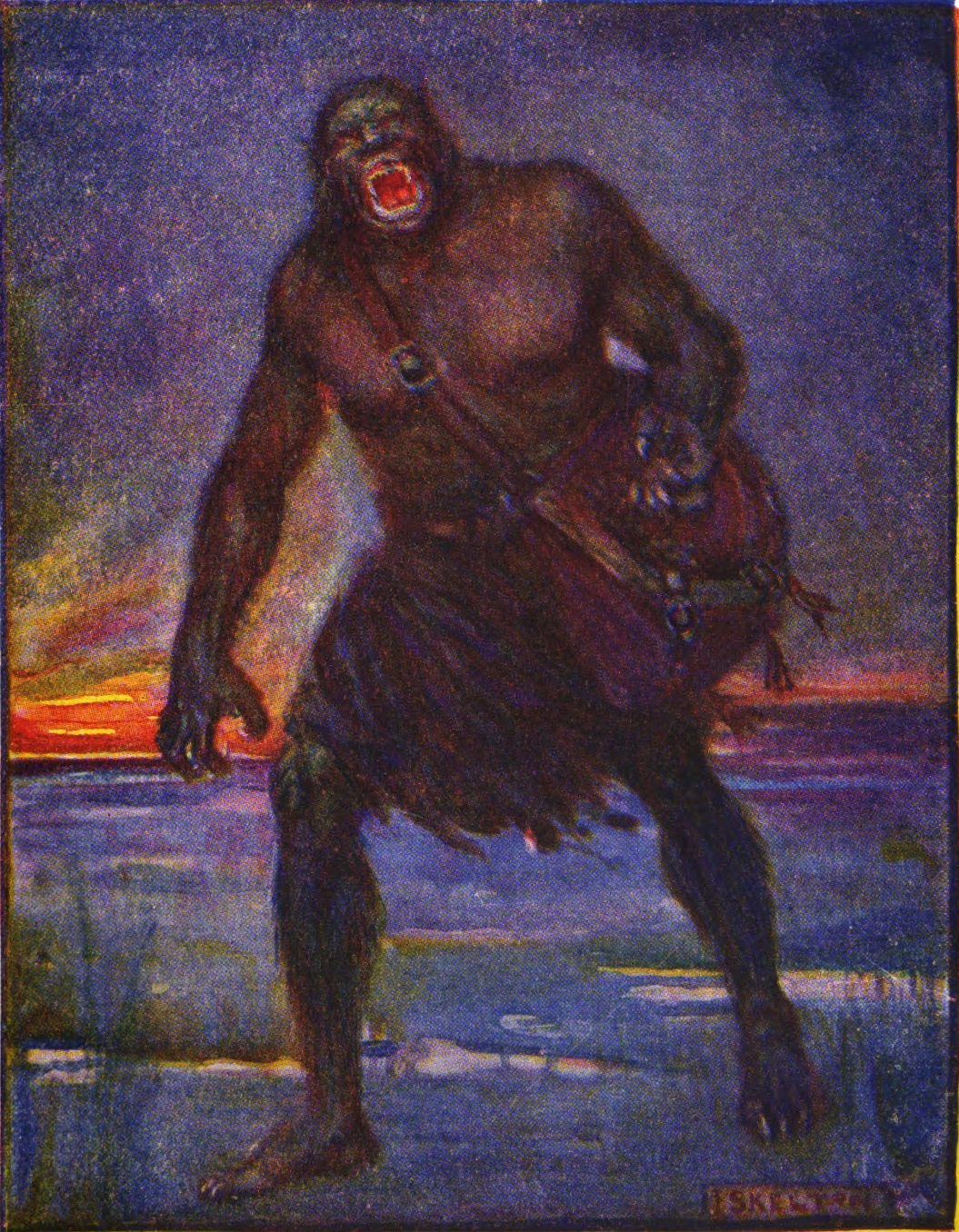
Tolkien's descriptions of the Dead Marshes and the grim Morgai have been compared to the Beowulf poet's account of Grendel's dangerous moors. 1908 illustration by Joseph Ratcliffe Skelton

Tolkien, a scholar of Old English, was an expert on Beowulf, calling it one of his "most valued sources" for Middle-earth. (Note: Carpenter 2023, #25 to the editor of The Observer, signed "Habit", published 16 January 1938) The medievalists Stuart D. Lee and Elizabeth Solopova compare Tolkien's account of Mordor and the neighbouring landscapes to the monster Grendel's wilderness in Beowulf. In particular, they compare Frodo and Sam's crossing of the Dead Marshes and what Gollum called its "tricksy lights", with Beowulf's "fire on the water"; and their traversal of the parched Morgai, full of rocks and vicious thorns, with Grendel's dangerous moors. Lee and Solopova write that the Beowulf description both emphasises the coming horror, "play[ing] on ideas of desolation, wintry landscapes and the supernatural", and like Tolkien giving realistic descriptions of nature. At the same time, they write, both the Beowulf poet and Tolkien incorporate "an element of fantasy": Grendel's moor is both full of water and a "craggy headland .. inhabited by supernatural evil", while Tolkien fills the landscapes in and around Mordor with "similar ambiguity and sense of unease".

Lee and Solopova's comparison of Beowulf landscapes with Mordor
Grendel's wilderness in Beowulf II.1345-1382	Translation	Landscapes around Mordor
... ... ... ... Hie dygel lond warigeað, wulfhleoþu, windige næssas, frecne fengelad	... ... ... ... They a secret land watch, wolf-infested slopes / windy headlands dangerous moor-path	The Morgai: rocks, thorns, "grassless, bare, jagged ... barren", "ruinous and dead"
wudu wyrtum fæst / wæter oferhelmað. þær mæg nihta gehwæm / niðwundor seon, fyr on flode. ... Nis þæt heoru stow!	Well-rooted trees / overshadow the water There one may each night / a horrible wonder see: fire on the water, ... This is not a safe place.	"wide fens and mires... Mists curled and smoked from dark and noisome pools". "Candles for corpses" (lights in the Dead Marshes)

=== 'Black Country' of the West Midlands ===
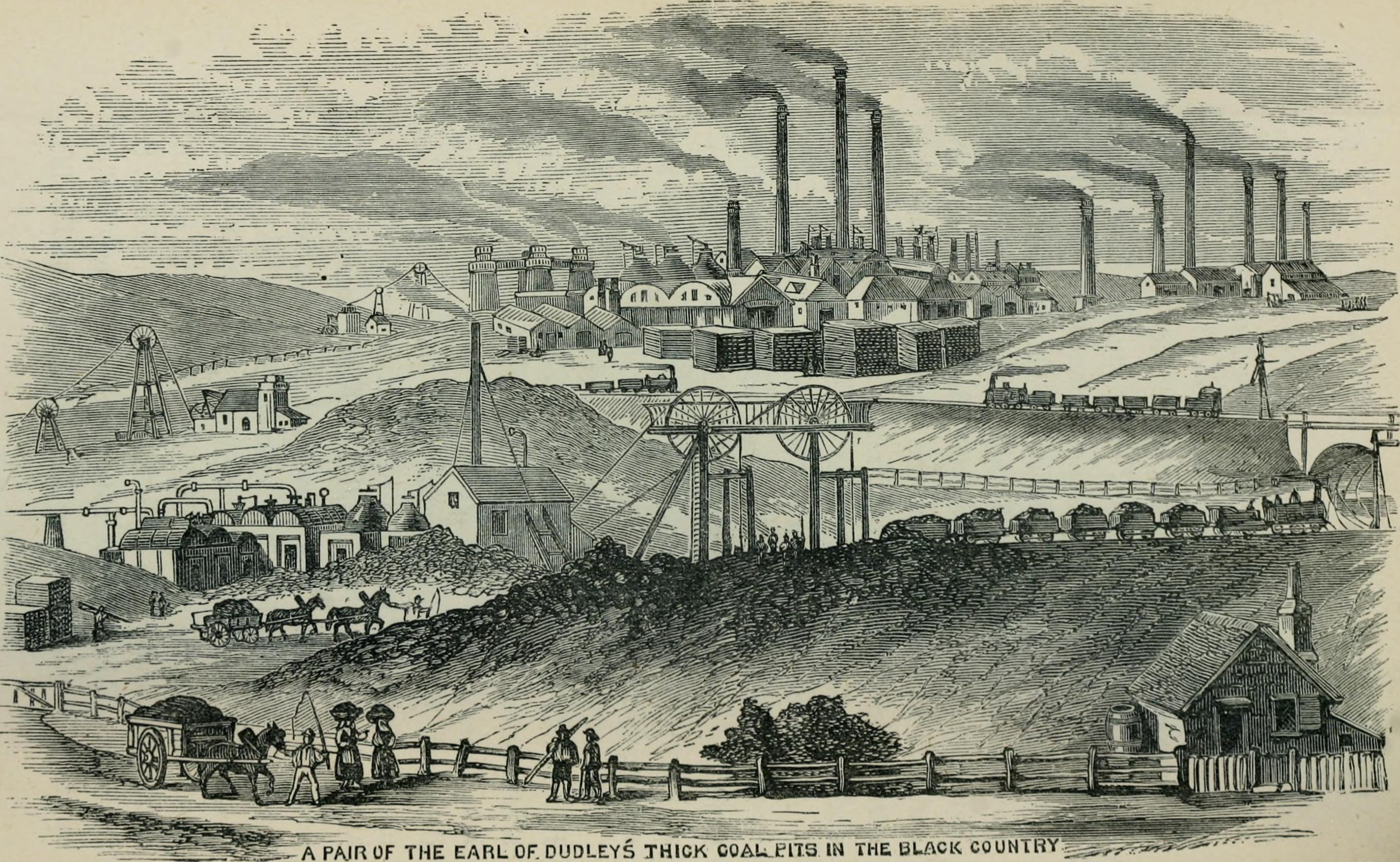
Mines, ironworks, smoke, and spoil heaps: the Black Country, near Tolkien's childhood home, has been suggested as an influence on his vision of Mordor.

A 2014 art exhibition entitled "The Making of Mordor" at the Wolverhampton Art Gallery claims that the steelworks and blast furnaces of the West Midlands near Tolkien's childhood home inspired his vision of, and his name Mordor. This industrialized area has long been known as "the Black Country". Philip Womack, writing in The Independent, likens Tolkien's move from rural Warwickshire to urban Birmingham as "exile from a rural idyll to Mordor-like forges and fires". The critic Chris Baratta notes the contrasting environments of the well-tended leafy Shire, the home of the hobbits, and "the industrial wastelands of Isengard and Mordor." Baratta comments that Tolkien clearly intended the reader to "identify with some of the problems of environmental destruction, rampant industrial invasion, and the corrupting and damaging effects these have on mankind."

=== First World War's Western Front ===
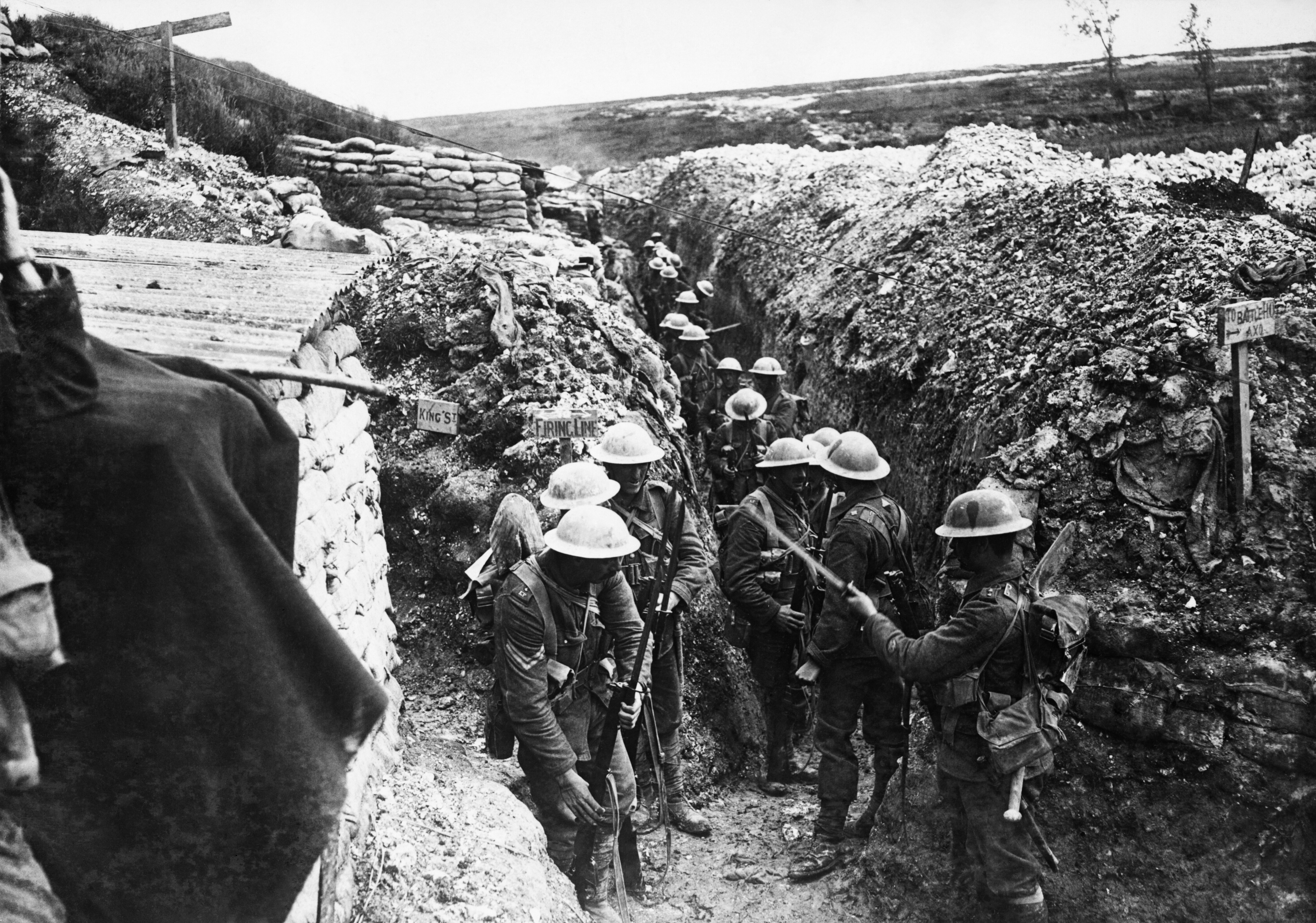
Tolkien stated that his trench warfare experience with his regiment, the Lancashire Fusiliers, on the Western Front influenced his account of the landscape around Mordor.

The New York Times related the grim land of Mordor to Tolkien's personal experience in the trenches of the Western Front in the First World War. Jane Ciabattari, writing on the BBC culture website, calls the hobbits' struggle to take the ring to Mordor "a cracked mirror reflection of the young soldiers caught in the blasted landscape and slaughter of trench warfare on the Western Front." In one of his letters in 1960, Tolkien himself wrote that "The Dead Marshes [just north of Mordor] and the approaches to the Morannon [an entrance to Mordor] owe something to northern France after the Battle of the Somme". (Note: Carpenter 2023, #226 to Professor L. W. Forster, 31 December 1960)

=== Evil ===
The critic Lykke Guanio-Uluru sees Mordor as specifically evil, marked by Sauron: a land that is "dying, struggling for life, though not yet dead", evil being able to disfigure life but not to destroy it completely. It is contrasted, writes Guanio-Uluru, with the beauty of Lothlorien, and marked by negative adjectives like "harsh, twisted, bitter, struggling, low, coarse, withered, tangled, stabbing, sullen, shrivelled, grating, rattling, sad".

=== Turkey ===
In 1976, George W. Geib suggested a parallel with the history of Christian Europe from the Crusades against Islam onwards, and specifically with late 17th century history of Eastern Europe. The siege and relief of Minas Tirith, he proposed, resembled those of Vienna in 1683, with the Turkish forces in the place of those of Mordor. The attack in both cases is from the East: over the Balkan hills or the Ephel Duath; across the plains of Hungary or Ithilien; over the river Danube or Anduin; supported by "wild Tartar horsemen" or "eastern cavalry"; the siege of the walls by "Turkish sappers" or Mordor's Orcs; relief by a battle further downstream, whether by Charles, Duke of Lorraine of Imre Thokoly's army, or by Aragorn over the Corsairs of Umbar; and the breaking of the siege by an army from the north, whether Polish forces or the Riders of Rohan.

== Legacy ==
=== In film ===
Mordor as seen in Peter Jackson's film The Return of the King, with a shattered volcanic landscape for the plain of Gorgoroth as Frodo and Sam approach Mount Doom under its red glare and the ever-watchful Eye of Sauron from his tower of Barad-dûr, all rendered using digital technology

Mordor features in all three films of Peter Jackson's Lord of the Rings trilogy. In the first film, Sean Bean, playing Boromir, the warrior from Gondor, declares to the Council of Elrond that "one does not simply walk into Mordor". In the second, Andy Serkis's digital Gollum guides Frodo and Sam to the Black Gate. In the final film, Frodo and Sam struggle across the shattered volcanic plain of Gorgoroth to Mount Doom, dressed as orcs, under the red glare of the volcano and the watchful Eye of Sauron from an exaggeratedly Gothic Barad-dûr, while the Army of the West gathers for the final battle in front of the Black Gate and witnesses the cataclysmic destruction of everything Sauron had built when the Ring is destroyed.

For Jackson's film trilogy, Richard Taylor and his design team built an 18 ft (5 m) high miniature ("big-ature") of Barad-dûr. Jackson's The Lord of the Rings: The Return of the King movie (2003) showed Barad-dûr as clearly visible from the Black Gate of Mordor, which is not the case in the book. Jackson portrayed Barad-dûr, like the other enemy fortresses of Isengard, Minas Morgul and the Black Gate, in "an exaggerated Gothic fashion" with a black metallic appearance. In The Lord of the Rings, the Eye was within the "Window of the Eye" in the topmost tower, whereas in Jackson's film trilogy the Eye appeared between two horn-like spires that curved upwards from the tower top.

In Womack's view the 2019 biopic Tolkien explicitly connects Mordor to trench warfare: "riders become bloody knights; smoke billows and turns into the form of dark kings."

=== In other media ===
The third verse of Led Zeppelin's 1969 song "Ramble On" by Jimmy Page features a "bizarre" Middle-earth including a Mordor where one can meet beautiful women: "Twas in the darkest depths of Mordor / I met a girl so fair / But Gollum, and the evil one crept up / And slipped away with her".

The 2014 Middle-earth: Shadow of Mordor is a third-person open world action-adventure video game set in Middle-earth.

The International Astronomical Union names all mountains on Saturn's moon Titan after mountains in Tolkien's work. In 2012, they named a Titanian mountain "Doom Mons" after Mount Doom.

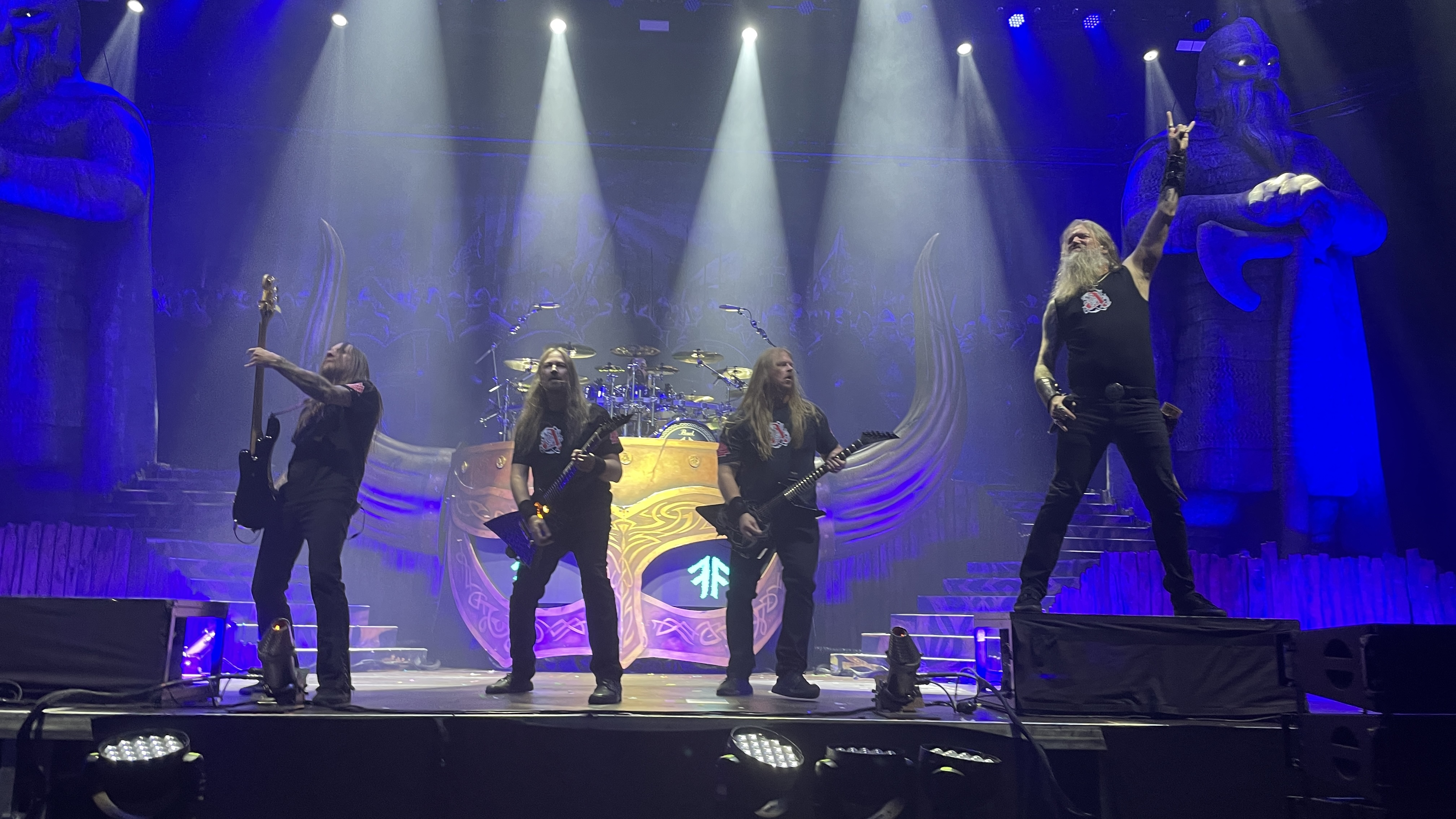
Heavy metal bands such as Amon Amarth have chosen their names from features of Mordor.

In music, heavy metal bands including the American Cirith Ungol, the Swedish melodic death metal band Amon Amarth (Sindarin for 'Mount Doom'), whose lyrics deal primarily with Viking culture and Norse mythology, and the North American doom metal band Orodruin, are named after features of Mordor.

=== Places ===
In the city of Warsaw, Poland, an area in the south-western district of Mokotów, in the neighbourhoods of Służewiec and Ksawerów, is commonly known as Mordor. Two small streets there are named in reference to Tolkien's works: J. R. R. Tolkiena Street, and Gandalfa Street.

== See also ==
- Dol Guldur
- The Last Ringbearer
