= Fictions (company) =

American video game publisher

Fictions, Inc.
- Formerly: Private Division (2017–2025)
- Type: Private
- Industry: Video games
- Founded: December 14, 2017; 8 years ago in New York City, U.S.
- Founders: Michael Worosz; Allen Murray
- Headquarters: Los Angeles, California, U.S.
- Parent: Take-Two Interactive (2017–2024); Haveli Investments (2024–present)
- Website: fictions.com

Fictions, Inc. (formerly Private Division) is an American video game publisher based in Los Angeles, California. The company was founded in December 2017 as a publishing label of Take-Two Interactive. It funds and publishes indie games developed by small to mid-sized studios; this includes taking over Kerbal Space Program publishing and releasing titles from Obsidian Entertainment, Panache Digital Games, and V1 Interactive.

In addition to its former office within Take-Two's headquarters in New York City, Private Division formerly had offices in Seattle, Las Vegas and Munich. Private Division was Take-Two Interactive's third publishing label, following Rockstar Games and 2K. Take-Two divested itself from Private Division to Haveli Investments in November 2024.

== History ==
=== As Private Division ===
Former logo as Private Division (2017–2025)

Take-Two's prior publishing model has been focused on its two internally-owned labels, Rockstar Games which is used for its action-adventure games like Grand Theft Auto, and its 2K label that includes 2K Games and 2K Sports for other games. All such games are developed principally through internal development studios or from large third-party triple-A studios (such as Firaxis Games with Civilization IV or Gearbox Software for the Borderlands series).

Take-Two formed Private Division as a new publishing label to help smaller and independent studios. The label looks to provide funding and publishing for "triple-I" games such as Ninja Theory's Hellblade: Senua’s Sacrifice, those that fell into the middle ground between triple-A games by large studios, and indie games created by relatively new and small indie studios. The formation of Private Division was led by Take-Two's head of corporate development and independent publishing Michael Worosz. Worosz, in evaluating potential games to publish under Take-Two's name, found a number of mid-sized studios founded by developers that had prior triple-A development experience but wanted to create less ambitious games. Worosz learned that these studios struggled with funding, as they did not fit into the types of studios backed by indie game publishers like Devolver Digital, and their projects were too large to be backed through self-funding or crowdfunding. About two and a half years prior to the label's announcement Worosz pitched the idea of Private Division to Take-Two's CEO Strauss Zelnick, who greenlit the creation of the label and they hired Allen Murray in late 2015 to run the production side, begin recruiting developers and build their team and infrastructure. The label aids in the development process and works with the developer to create project timelines and milestones, and will help the publish and distribute the games when completed, but does not seek to own the intellectual property of the developers.

With the label's formation on December 14, 2017, Take-Two announced four games already in the works to be published under the label: The Outer Worlds from Obsidian Entertainment, Darkborn (originally as working title Project Wight) from The Outsiders, Disintegration from V1 Interactive, and Ancestors: The Humankind Odyssey from Panache Digital Games. Additionally, Kerbal Space Program, acquired earlier by Take-Two from Squad, was re-published under the Private Division label. In the case of Darkborn, some time in 2018, Private Division and The Outsiders decided to go separate ways, with Private Division stating that they continued to support The Outsiders for several months after the termination of the contract.

In February 2020, Take-Two established a studio within Private Division located at Seattle for development of Kerbal Space Program 2, later named Intercept Games, with several of Star Theory Games staff, including Jeremy Ables and Nate Simpson, joining the new studio.

In July 2020, Private Division announced publishing deals with Moon Studios, League of Geeks and Roll7 for yet-unannounced games. Later, in November 2021, Private Division acquired Roll7. The game with League of Geeks was cancelled during the COVID-19 pandemic.

In March 2022, Private Division announced publishing deals with four more studios: Die Gute Fabrik, Evening Star, Piccolo Studio and Yellow Brick Games. Die Gute Fabrik and Yellow Brick self-published Saltsea Chronicles (2023) and Eternal Strands (2025) respectively. In August, the company announced a partnership with Wētā Workshop to publish a game in the Middle-Earth franchise. The game was revealed to be Tales of the Shire and is scheduled to release in July 2025. In December, Private Division announced a publishing deal with Bloober Team to release a survival horror game (later revealed to be Cronos: The New Dawn). Private Division would later end up cancelling the publishing deal with Bloober Team in May 2024.

In March 2023, an unspecified number of Private Division employees were affected by layoffs as part of parent company Take-Two's effort to save $50 million. In May, Private Division announced a partnership with Pokémon developer Game Freak for an untitled action-adventure game, codenamed Project Bloom. The game is scheduled to release during Take-Two Interactive's 2026 fiscal year. During a Nintendo Direct in June, Penny's Big Breakaway was unveiled and subsequently released on February 21, 2024.

=== As Fictions ===
In April 2024, Take-Two Interactive stated their intent to cut 5% of the workforce by the end of 2024. GamesIndustry.biz reported that this led to a "vast majority" of Private Division's staff across their offices in Seattle, New York, Las Vegas, and Munich being let go in May, including shuttering Roll7 and Intercept Games. IGN would go on to report that Take-Two is planning to shut down Private Division. In November, Take-Two's CEO Strauss Zelnick confirmed that the company had sold Private Division to an undisclosed buyer for an undisclosed sum, as to allow Take-Two to focus on AAA and mobile games. The company also affirmed the closure of Roll7 and Intercept Games. Take-Two would continue to support No Rest for the Wicked, while five other titles were transferred to the new buyer, though Moon Studios acquired the publishing rights from Take-Two in March 2025. Jason Schreier of Bloomberg News reported in January 2025 that the purchase was made by the investment firm Haveli Investments, who brought in the former staff of Annapurna Interactive who had left in September 2024 to manage the publishing duties for the remaining games in Private Division's roster, under an unnamed label.

The publisher was renamed to Fictions in June 2025, according to their privacy policy, coinciding with the reveal of Lego Party, and moved into a new office in Los Angeles, along with additional layoffs.

== Subsidiaries ==
=== Former ===
- Intercept Games in Seattle, Washington, founded in February 2020, closed in 2024.
- Roll7 in London, England, founded in 2008, acquired in November 2021 and closed in 2024.

== Games published ==
=== As Private Division ===
Year	Title	Developer(s)	Platforms
2018	Kerbal Space Program: Enhanced Edition	BlitWorks, Squad	PlayStation 4, PlayStation 5, Xbox One, Xbox Series X/S
2019	Ancestors: The Humankind Odyssey	Panache Digital Games	PlayStation 4, Windows, Xbox One
2019	The Outer Worlds	Obsidian Entertainment	Nintendo Switch, PlayStation 4, Windows, Xbox One
2020	Disintegration	V1 Interactive	PlayStation 4, Windows, Xbox One
2021	Hades (Note: Physical copy distribution only.)	Supergiant Games	PlayStation 4, PlayStation 5, Xbox One, Xbox Series X/S
2022	OlliOlli World	Roll7	Nintendo Switch, PlayStation 4, PlayStation 5, Windows, Xbox One, Xbox Series X/S
2022	Rollerdrome	Roll7	PlayStation 4, PlayStation 5, Windows, Xbox Series X/S
2023	After Us	Piccolo Studio	PlayStation 5, Windows, Xbox Series X/S
2023	Kerbal Space Program 2 (Note: Early Access release.)	Star Theory Games, Intercept Games	PlayStation 4, PlayStation 5, Windows, Xbox One, Xbox Series X/S
2024	Penny's Big Breakaway	Evening Star	Nintendo Switch, PlayStation 5, Windows, Xbox Series X/S
2025	Tales of the Shire: A The Lord of the Rings Game	Wētā Workshop	Nintendo Switch, PlayStation 5, Windows, Xbox Series X/S, iOS, Android

=== As Fictions ===
Year	Title	Developer(s)	Platforms
2025	Lego Party	SMG Studio	Nintendo Switch, Nintendo Switch 2, PlayStation 4, PlayStation 5, Windows, Xbox One, Xbox Series X/S
2026	Unhinged (co-development)	Night School Studio	Netflix
2026	Beast of Reincarnation	Game Freak	PlayStation 5, Windows, Xbox Series X/S
2026	Sword of the Sea	Giant Squid	Nintendo Switch 2, Xbox Series X/S
2026	Ancestors: The Humankind Odyssey	Panache Digital Games	Nintendo Switch 2, PlayStation 5, Xbox Series X/S
2027	Armatus	Counterplay Games	Nintendo Switch 2, PlayStation 5, Windows, Xbox Series X/S
2027	Everbloom	Torbie Games	Nintendo Switch 2, Windows
