= After Us (video game) =

2023 video game

- Developer: Piccolo Studio
- Publishers: Private Division; Untold Tales
- Directors: Alexis Corominas; Jordi Ministral; José Luis Vaello
- Producer: Naomi Steele
- Designers: Samuel Cohen; Laura Roldán; Adrià Sampé; Carla Sevillano; Luis Sanchez
- Programmers: Juan M. Martinez M.; David Soriano; Rubén Pineda Navarrete; David Pérez
- Artist: José Luis Vaello
- Composer: Dan Elms
- Engine: Unreal Engine
- Platforms: PlayStation 5; Windows; Xbox Series X/S
- Release: WW: May 23, 2023
- Genre: Action-adventure
- Mode: Single-player

After Us is an action-adventure video game developed by Piccolo Studio and published by Private Division in 2023. Players control a spirit who brings peace to the extinct animals on a dead version of Earth.

== Gameplay ==
Players control a forest spirit named Gaia who rescues the ghosts of the last animals that went extinct on a dystopian version of Earth. Each of the eight areas where Gaia can find a spirit is an open world connected to the others. To reach the ghosts, Gaia must jump and fly, as in platform games. Rescued ghosts can be sent to a central area, where Gaia can visit and pet them. Players must fight Devourers, the ghosts of humans who ravaged the planet. To do this, players can use a boomerang-like attack. The story is told wordlessly.

== Development ==
Developer Piccolo Studio are based on Barcelona, Spain. Private Division released it for Windows, PlayStation 5, and Xbox Series X/S on May 23, 2023.

== Reception ==
On Metacritic, the Windows and PlayStation 5 versions of After Us received mixed reviews, and the Xbox Series X/S version received positive reviews. Though they enjoyed the visuals, IGN said the game "[leans] heavily on unwieldy platforming and mind-numbing combat". IGN and Game Informer found the themes heavy-handed; however, IGN liked how players could bring some life back to the dead world, and Game Informer praised the game's emotional depth. Both Game Informer and GameSpot praised the environmental storytelling. Praising its gameplay, visuals, and message, Shacknews said it "make[s] for a satisfying puzzle-platformer overall". Eurogamer called it "a Game with a Message but not necessarily anything to say".
