= Tales of the Shire =

2025 video game

Tales of the Shire: A The Lord of the Rings Game
- Developer: Wētā Workshop
- Publisher: Private Division
- Series: Middle-earth
- Platforms: Nintendo Switch; PlayStation 5; Windows; Xbox Series X/S; Nintendo Switch 2
- Release: Nintendo Switch, PS5, Windows, Xbox Series X/S; 29 July 2025; Nintendo Switch 2; 25 March 2026
- Genre: Life simulation
- Mode: Single-player

Tales of the Shire: A The Lord of the Rings Game is a life simulation video game developed by Wētā Workshop and published by Private Division for Nintendo Switch, PlayStation 5, Windows and Xbox Series X/S on 29 July 2025. A version for Nintendo Switch 2 was released on 25 March 2026. Based on the legendarium created by J. R. R. Tolkien, the game takes place between the events of The Hobbit and The Lord of the Rings.

== Gameplay ==
Tales of the Shire is a life simulation video game. In the game, the player creates their own Hobbit character, and settles in a village named Bywater. The player must manage the Hobbit's day-to-day life and chores, such as fishing, gardening, and foraging for resources. Hobbit holes can also be extensively customized, and its interior can be decorated with numerous items. They can also cook meals using various recipes, and share them with other non-playable characters (NPC). Players can also explore Bywater and its surrounding areas, completing quests and developing friendships with NPCs. This increases the player's Fellowship, which then helps progress the main quest and story. When players place a waypoint in the game's map, a bird will show up in the game's world to guide them to their objectives.

== Development ==
The game was developed by Weta Workshop Game Studio, a division within Wētā Workshop founded in 2014 to create video games. According to Stephen Lambert, the game's creative director, the goal for the game was for players to live their "idyllic life as a Hobbit". The game is set between The Hobbit and The Lord of the Rings, and it has a lighthearted story about "Hobbit-sized problems in a Hobbit-sized world". Lambert added that the game was "very much born out of the COVID-19 period", and that the team wanted to create something relaxing and soothing with a focus on building a community.

A collaboration between Wētā Workshop and Private Division was announced in 2022. The game was officially announced in September 2023.

== Reception ==
Reception

Aggregate scores
Aggregator	Score
Metacritic	(NS) 59/100 (PC) 58/100 (PS5) 61/100
OpenCritic	25% recommend

Review scores
Publication	Score
Destructoid	6/10
Eurogamer	2/5
GameSpot	4/10
GamesRadar+	3/5
Hardcore Gamer	3.5/5
IGN	4/10
Nintendo World Report	5.5/10
PC Gamer (US)	67/100
Push Square	4/10
The Guardian	3/5

Tales of the Shire received "mixed or average" reviews from critics, according to review aggregator website Metacritic. Fellow review aggregator OpenCritic assessed that the game received weak approval, being recommended by only 25% of critics.
