= Pukeahu National War Memorial Park =

New Zealand memorial park to commemorate World War I

Coordinates: 41.2989°S 174.7772°E

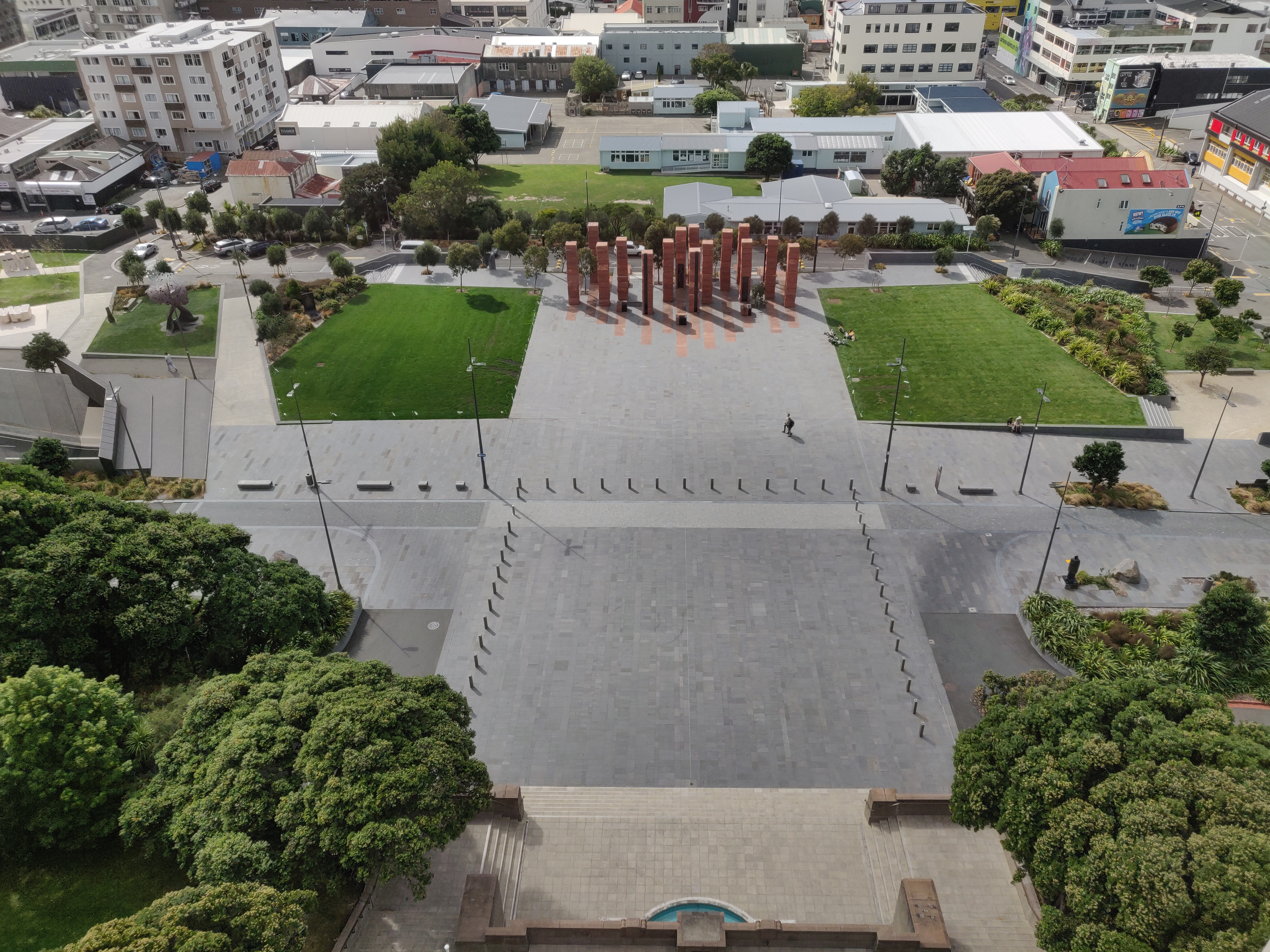
Pukeahu Park as seen from the Carillon

Pukeahu National War Memorial Park, also known as Pukeahu Park, is situated in front of the National War Memorial in the suburb of Mt Cook, Wellington, New Zealand. The park includes various national memorials to both New Zealand's military allies and historic opponents, and is situated on top of Arras Tunnel, which contains State Highway 1. It was opened in April 2015 as part of New Zealand's commemoration of the 100th anniversary of World War I.

== History ==
The original name of the hill where the memorial was built (Mount Cook) is 'Pukeahu' (from Māori puke ahu, "sacred hill") by the Ngāi Tara iwi (tribe). The name suggests usage for sacred purposes, additionally, the area was used for crop gardens. Due to later excavation of the hill, little archeological evidence of this usage remains.

As part of their agreement with local iwi, the area was part of land marked as "native reserves" by the New Zealand Company. However, this agreement was not upheld, and the land was instead used for penal and then military purposes, becoming the local base of the Armed Constabulary and "Wellington's main fortification". Buckle St, which now bisects the park, was closed for military use only until 1870.

Due to its military usage, the site was chosen as the home of the National War Memorial. It was planned to be connected to Courtenay Place by a "tree-lined boulevard", but this never occurred. Mount Cook School was also opened opposite Buckle Street, on land that presently forms part of the park, before being relocated to its current location in the 1970s. As the city expanded, Buckle Street grew from a small road to part of State Highway 1, which had to be closed for commemorative events.

In May 2004, then Prime Minister Helen Clark said,

A park would further enhance the area which is already being redeveloped with the building of the Tomb of the Unknown Warrior. It will provide a more appropriate setting for New Zealand's memorial to those New Zealanders who gave their lives in times of war. Significant aspects of our heritage and identity were forged in difficult times of conflict...this is illustrated by the growing numbers of people who attend Anzac Day services in New Zealand.

In 2005, the Ministry for Culture and Heritage worked with the New Zealand Transport Agency to acquire land on the northern side of Buckle Street, in front of the National War Memorial, to create a National Memorial Park. In August 2012, the government announced that the Buckle Street section of State Highway 1 would be moved underground to a cut and cover tunnel, allowing the park to extend over the old road area to create a unified memorial precinct.

The park opened on 18 April 2015 in time for the centenary of the World War I Gallipoli landings, and was one of the New Zealand Government's key projects to commemorate the 100th anniversary of World War I.

In 2024 a Waitangi Solidarity Hīkoi was held on Waitangi Day at the park.

== Artworks, memorials and sculptures ==
The park contains memorials from both New Zealand's military allies and historic opponents, as well as a garden reflecting the Māori history of the area.

=== Ngā Tapuwae o te Kāhui Maunga ===
The garden Ngā Tapuwae o te Kāhui Maunga (lit. 'The Footsteps of the Ancestors') is designed to reflect the Māori history of the area, being designed in collaboration with Taranaki Whānui. It has three rocks signifying Mount Tongariro, Mount Taranaki and Mount Ruapehu, as well as bricks representing the prison that previously stood in the area. It also includes the statue Hinerangi by Darcy Nicholas, which signifies relatives of those who died in combat.

=== Australian Memorial ===
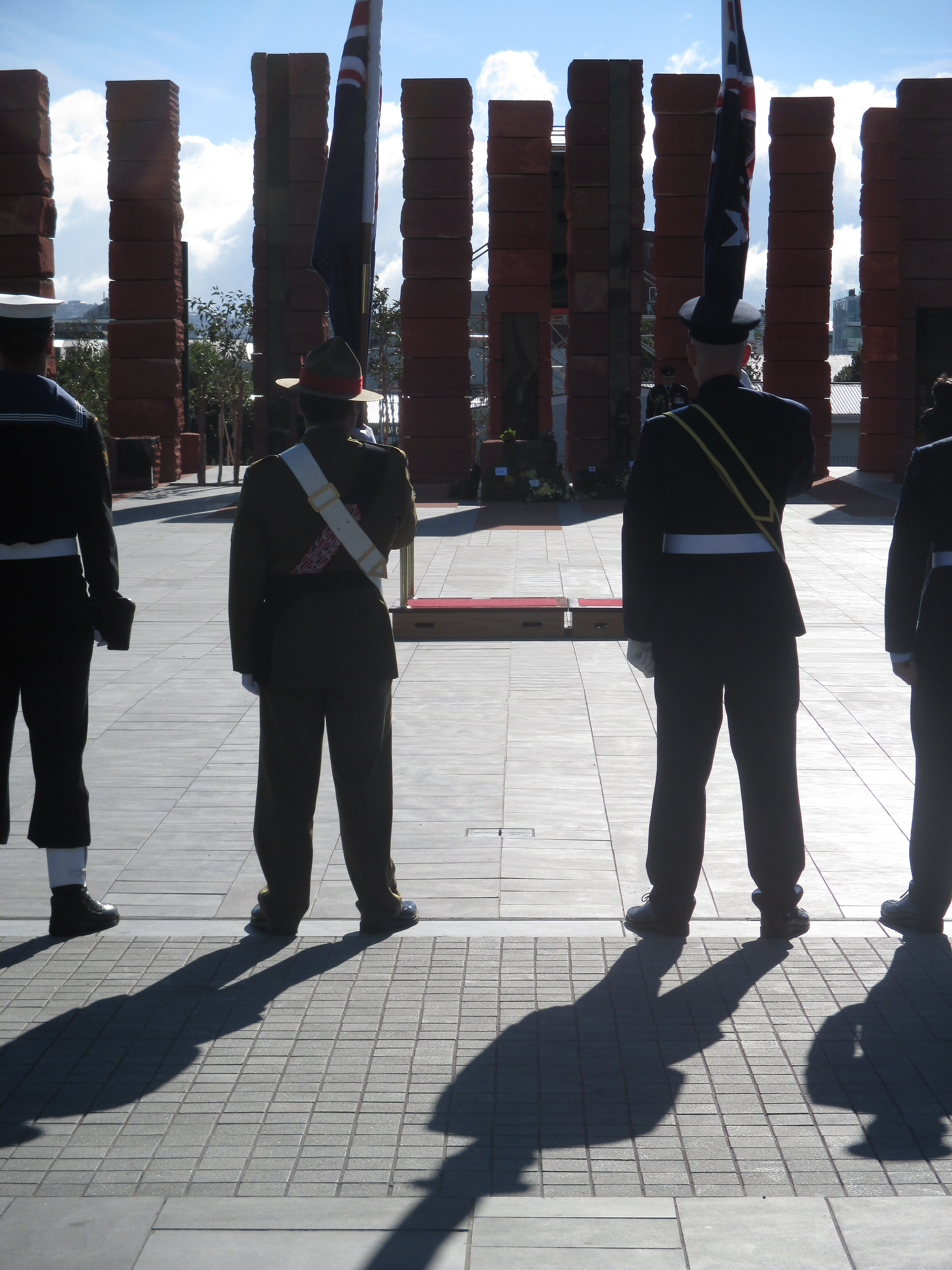
Australian Memorial

The Australian memorial, designed by Australian architects Tonkin Zulaikha Greer, commemorates the significant military relationship between Australia and New Zealand. The memorial consists of fifteen red sandstone columns with various inscriptions and artworks by both Aboriginal and Māori artists. The memorial was opened in April 2015 by Australian Prime Minister Tony Abbott and New Zealand Prime Minister John Key.

=== Belgian Memorial ===
The Belgian memorial was designed by Belgian artists Niko Van Stichel and Lut Vandebos. Made of steel, the sculpture combines both a traditional symbol of victory, the laurel wreath, with a memorial wreath as a tribute to those who died in battle. A similar sculpture has been installed in East Flanders, Belgium. Belgian Deputy Prime Minister and Minister for Foreign Affairs, Didier Reynders, attended a site blessing ceremony followed by outgoing Belgian Ambassador Jean-Luc Bodson breaking ground. Mauri stones and soil from Belgium were placed into the ground by Ambassador Mullie at a later September 2017 ceremony, and the sculpture was unveiled in October 2017.

=== French Memorial ===
The French Memorial Le Calligramme was unveiled by French Minister for State Geneviève Darrieussecq and Minister of Justice, Courts and Treaty of Waitangi Negotiations Andrew Little in May 2018.

Le Calligramme features an inscription of the words of French soldier Guillaume Apollinaire's 1915 poem Le Chant de l’Honneur (Song of Honour), published in a book titled Calligrammes: Poems of Peace and War 1913–1916. The memorial combines landscaping with two large elements made of local stone and crushed French Combe Brune stone from the Western Front. The memorial was designed by architectural firm Patterson Associates Ltd, with Paul Baragwanath and Suzanne Turley Landscapes, and constructed by Naylor Love.

=== German Tapestry ===
In November 2017, the President of Germany, Dr Frank-Walter Steinmeier unveiled a memorial tapestry gifted on behalf of Germany while visiting the National War Memorial. Titled Flandern, the tapestry is based on one of a series of photographs of 14 First World War battlefield sites. The artist, Stephen Schenk, explained that the work was "a reminder of the untold misery and horror, and was created to remember the victims of this inconceivable catastrophe of the twentieth century".

=== Pacific Islands Memorial ===
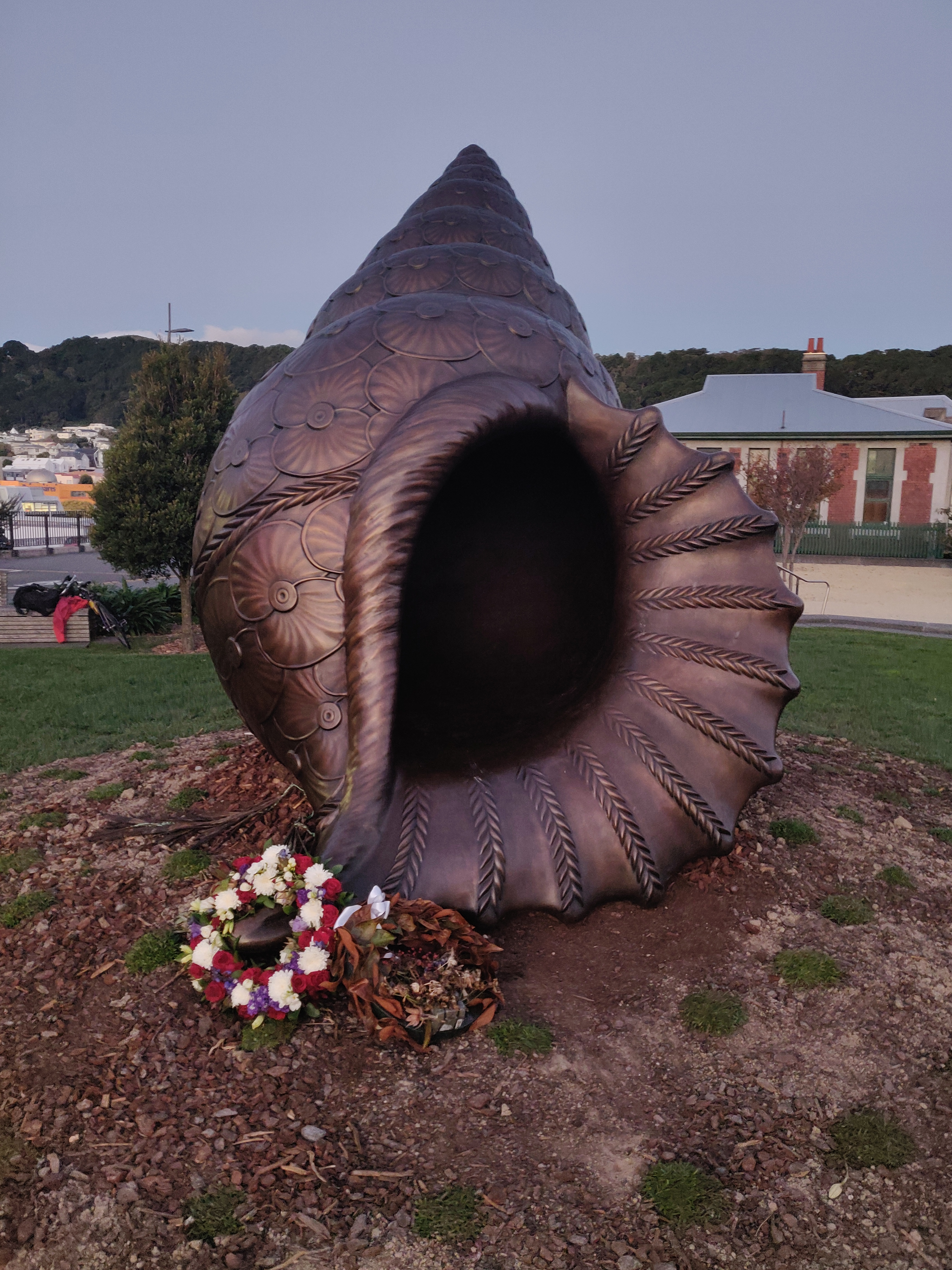
The Pacific Islands memorial

A memorial honouring the service of Pacific Islanders in the world wars and later conflicts was dedicated in March 2021, specifically honouring the service of overseas soldiers and the Coastwatchers. Titled Te Reo Hotunui o te Moana-nui-a-Kiwa (translating to The Deep Sigh of the Pacific), the memorial features a large bronze sculpture of a conch (Chicoreus ramosus) shell with remembrance poppies. Designed by Michel Tuffery, the sculpture was inspired by a conch shell found in a World War I-era tunnel in Arras, France that was inscribed by Private Angene Angene, a Cook Islander who served on the Western Front. The dedication was attended by the prime ministers of New Zealand and the Cook Islands, Jacinda Ardern and Mark Brown. At the dedication, both prime ministers called for increased recognition of the military service of Pacific Islanders.

=== Turkish Memorial ===
Unveiled in March 2017, this memorial features a free-standing bronze plaque with words of reconciliation widely attributed to Mustafa Kemal Atatürk cut through it. This allows the viewer to see a Turkish red pine (pinus brutia) descended from the original Lone Pine at Gallipoli, which is planted directly behind the plaque. The memorial was designed by New Zealand artist and Army Gunner Matt Gauldie.

=== United Kingdom Memorial ===
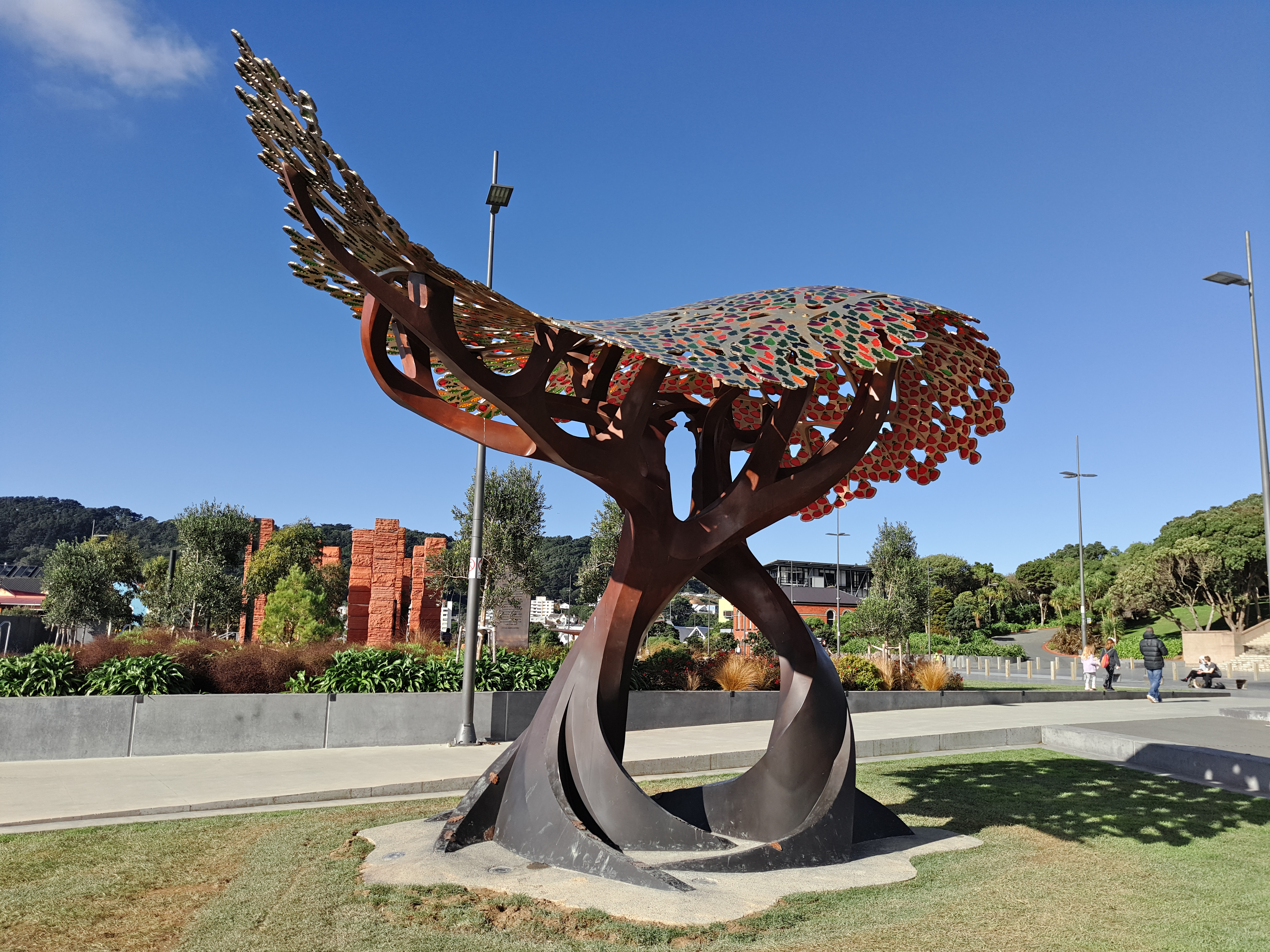
Whakaruruhau United Kingdom Memorial

In July 2017, the United Kingdom Memorial was unveiled by the UK Secretary of State for Foreign and Commonwealth Affairs, Boris Johnson. The memorial was designed and built by Weta Workshop with input from students at Massey University and the British Wimbledon College of Arts.

The design takes the form of two of the UK and New Zealand's most iconic trees. The trunks of a Royal Oak and a pōhutukawa intertwine to form one single leafy canopy, where leaves from both trees merge to create sense of shelter – giving the memorial its name: Whakaruruhau. Standing at the plaque, between the branches a silhouette of a single soldier can be seen, representing the union of two countries who stood side by side and those millions who served in times of conflict, resolution and peace.

=== United States of America Memorial ===
On 10 December 2018, the U.S. Memorial representing the United States and New Zealand's shared history was unveiled, commissioned by the U.S. Government and the American Battle Monuments Commission. The memorial contains a granite tablet carved in Madison, Wisconsin, with words taken from a radio address delivered on Anzac Day 1943, by the US Secretary of the Navy Frank Knox. It reads:

Together, in our strength, we shall keep that ocean – Pacific! ... As we are comrades in battle, so we shall be partners in victory. I salute the lands of the ANZACs as our companions in the peace that will follow, comrades and partners as an example to all the world of what can be accomplished by a fraternity of free men.

=== 1918 Influenza Pandemic Memorial Plaque ===
On 6 November 2019 a memorial plaque for the victims of the 1918 Influenza Pandemic was unveiled at Pukeahu. The pandemic killed around 9000 New Zealanders. The plaque was designed by Neil Pardington and Wraight & Associates, and was unveiled by the Prime Minister and Minister for Arts, Culture and Heritage Jacinda Ardern with historian Geoffrey Rice.

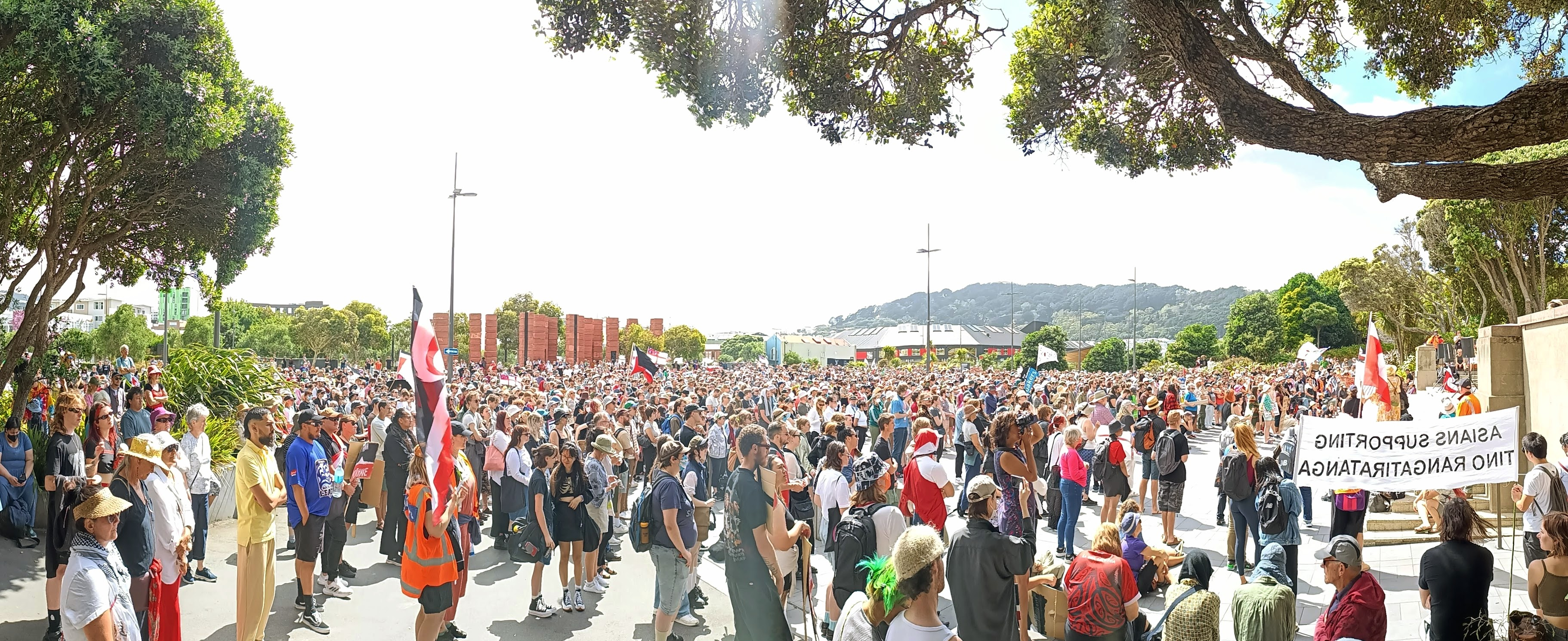
Waitangi Day Solidarity Hīkoi 2024

== Arras Tunnel ==
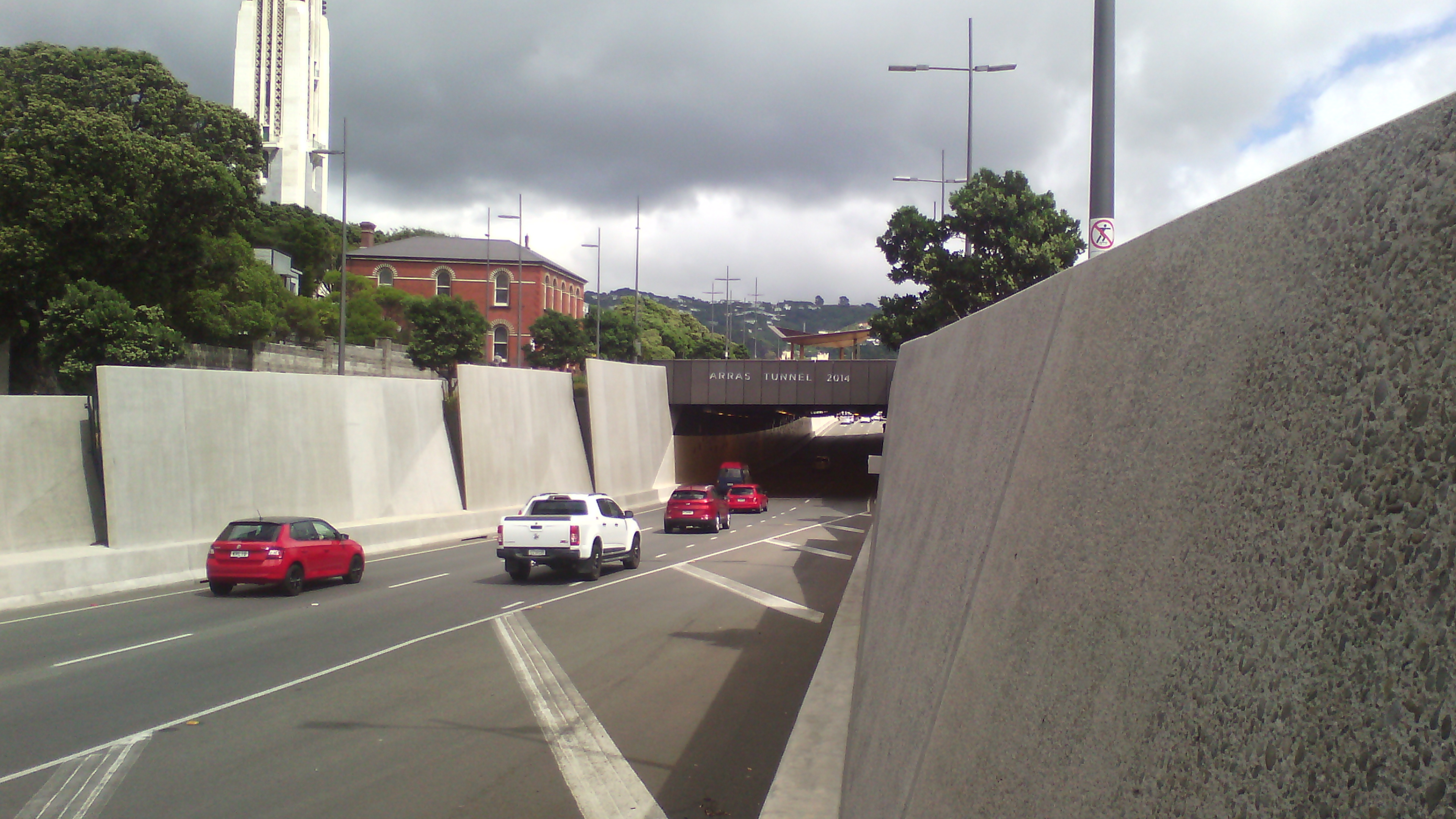
Arras Tunnel, part of the Wellington Inner City Bypass, which passes under the Memorial Park

State Highway 1 flows underneath the park in a one-way, 130 m long tunnel. It opened to traffic on 29 September 2014, with the name of Arras Tunnel. The tunnel was named to honour the wartime efforts of the New Zealand Tunnelling Company in the French town of Arras during the Great War. The tunnel contains 273 decorative red poppies, to remind drivers that they are passing through a significant commemorative space.

== Awards ==
- New Zealand Indigenous and Specialty Timber Award – Resene Timber Design Awards 2015
- Public Architecture Award – New Zealand Architecture Awards 2016
- George Malcolm Award – New Zealand Institute of Landscape Architects 2017
