= Penny's Big Breakaway =

2024 video game

- Developer: Evening Star
- Publisher: Private Division
- Directors: Hunter Bridges; Christian Whitehead
- Producers: Dave Padilla; John Fenlon
- Designer: Brad Flick
- Artists: Tom Fry; Kieran Gates
- Composers: Tee Lopes; Sean Bialo; Christian Whitehead
- Engine: Retro Engine (Note: Previously referred to as the Star Engine, it is now retroactively considered the latest iteration of the engine created by Christian Whitehead.)
- Platforms: Nintendo Switch; PlayStation 5 Windows; Xbox Series X/S
- Release: February 21, 2024
- Genres: Platform, action
- Mode: Single-player

Penny's Big Breakaway is a 2024 platform game developed by Evening Star and published by Private Division. It was released on February 21, 2024, for Nintendo Switch, PlayStation 5, Windows, and Xbox Series X/S. The game was announced during a Nintendo Direct presentation which aired on June 21, 2023. The game follows Penny and her yo-yo, who must evade Emperor Eddie and his army of penguins after causing a stir.

== Gameplay ==
Penny's Big Breakaway is a 3D platformer in which players control Penny, an aspiring street performer who is paired up with Yo-Yo, a yo-yo that has been given life by a cosmic string. The main Story Mode is split up into several levels across various worlds, most of which require Penny to make it safely to the end while avoiding Emperor Eddie's penguin guards who will try to catch her on sight. Movement in the game focuses on speed and momentum and is largely centered around Penny's Yo-Yo, which can be fired in any direction to attack enemies, swung on in mid-air to clear large gaps, and ridden upon to maintain speed and momentum. Players can chain these various moves together to rack up high scores. Some levels also have treat power-ups that temporarily give Yo-Yo new abilities, such as smashing through obstacles or flying through the air. At the end of each level, players land on a podium and attempt to busk with yo-yo tricks to earn coins. Penny's health is represented with gusto which decreases if she takes damage, falls out of a level, or is overwhelmed with penguins, with players inducing a large score penalty for losing all of their gusto. Each main level contains three NPCs with "dilemma" side-quests and three hidden giant coins. Clearing the dilemmas increases the coins earned from busking at the end, while the giant coins unlock extra Star Globe levels. Coins earned through each level can be spent on power-ups such as protection from penguins or extra points for a perfect run, and postcards containing concept art can be unlocked by scoring high enough on each stage. Levels cleared in Story Mode can be played in Time Attack mode, which features online leaderboards.

== Plot ==
In Vanillatown, on the planet Macaroon, Penny notices a flyer advertising an audition for performers to partner up with Emperor Eddie at the upcoming Gala and decides to perform yo-yo tricks at the audition. On her way to the audition at Eddie's "Eddietorium", Penny discovers a cosmic string, which makes her yo-yo become sentient. Penny soon arrives at the Eddietorium, cutting through a long line of auditioners. The audition goes over well until Yo-Yo mischievously jumps at Emperor Eddie and rips his clothes off. Penny is wrongly blamed for committing this crime and she flees the Eddietorium, pursued by Eddie's army of penguins.

Penny escapes to a beach called Tideswell, where she runs into a sailor named Sheila, who reveals that she intended to audition at the Gala but lost her opportunity because of Penny. However, Sheila forgives Penny after the latter fixes the former's boat and she agrees to take Penny to an island called Zaphara. There, Penny meets a magician named Mr. Q, who recognizes Yo-Yo's cosmic string to have previously belonged to Emperor Eddie's former partner, The Taboo Artist. Following an encounter with Eddie, Penny ends up in the World's Edge, where she meets Taboo, who explains that she was the director of Eddie's Gala performances but quit when the latter let the fame go to his head and grew tired of the former's experiments. Upon learning about Penny's predicament, Taboo suggests that she sneak to the Lawberry courthouse to rip out her page in the Book of Law, which would undo her crimes. On the way, Penny is caught by the penguins, who take her directly to the courthouse.

In the courthouse, Penny confronts Judge Rufus, who soon realizes that Yo-Yo is sentient and therefore that Penny was not the cause of the whole incident. On these grounds, the judge offers to let Penny go and perform with Emperor Eddie at the Gala, but at the cost of Yo-Yo. Not wanting to be without Yo-Yo, Penny refuses and escapes the courthouse. Penny makes it to the Gala, where she battles Eddie again, with help from her former foes. During the battle, Eddie comes to realize Taboo's significance to him and reconciles with her; Taboo transforms Eddie into a giant, who is still intent on defeating Penny. Penny manages to make it through Eddie's obstacles and finishes off the act by performing a daring stunt, prompting the audience to clap and cheer for Penny, Eddie, and Taboo, who all forgive each other. In a post-credits scene, Penny is sentenced by Judge Rufus to "one Whirling Wafer's worth" of community service.

== Development ==
Penny's Big Breakaway was developed by Evening Star, a studio founded in 2018 by the developers of Sonic Mania and creatively led by Christian Whitehead. The game was described as "a beautifully stylized, colorful adventure game". The game was first announced as an untitled 3D platform project in October 2021. In March 2022, it was revealed that the game would be published by Private Division.

During development, Evening Star were also being considered by Sega to develop a new Sonic the Hedgehog game, but these plans fell through. Instead, original character designer Naoto Oshima and his studio, Arzest, worked together with Sonic Team to make Sonic Superstars. On June 21, 2023, the game was fully revealed during a Nintendo Direct presentation and was scheduled for an early 2024 release on the Nintendo Switch, PlayStation 5, Windows, and Xbox Series X/S.

The game was released on February 21, 2024, during a Nintendo Direct Partner Showcase presentation. Although the other releases of the game capped at 60fps, the Switch version originally capped at 30fps during its launch. On March 26, 2024, a "performance mode" was added so the game could play at a frame rate of up to 60fps.

The soundtrack was released digitally by the French record label Kid Katana Records.

== Reception ==
Reception

Aggregate scores
Aggregator	Score
Metacritic	NS: 76/100; PS5: 76/100; PC: 74/100; XSX: 78/100
OpenCritic	63% recommend

Review scores
Publication	Score
Digital Trends	3.5/5
GameSpot	7/10
Hardcore Gamer	3.5/5
Nintendo Life	8/10
PC Gamer (US)	80/100
PCMag	4/5
Push Square	7/10
Shacknews	9/10

Penny's Big Breakaway received "generally favorable" reviews according to the review aggregation website Metacritic. Fellow review aggregator OpenCritic assessed that the game received strong approval, being recommended by 63% of critics.

Tomas Franzese of Digital Trends praised the game for its unique controls and yo-yo mechanics, noting that they were inspired by skateboard video games. However, Franzese criticized its difficult bosses. While acknowledging that the game "was hard to put down", he opted that "frustrations with these boss fights are what caused me to end my play session and come back later." Reviewing the Switch version, Mitch Vogel of Nintendo Life praised the game for its tight controls and its level design, but criticized the Switch's performance as the game runs at a locked 30fps, noting that the other platforms run the game at 60fps. On all platforms, the game received criticism for its wonky camera as well as its bugs — especially with Penny getting stuck in the walls of the game. The game was updated a few weeks after launch, including a "performance mode" for the Switch version that increases the maximum frame rate to 60fps, as well as numerous bug fixes across all platforms.

The music composed by Tee Lopes and Sean Bialo was considered to be the highlight of the game by many reviewers. Stephen Tailby of Push Square referred to it as "proper ear-worm music". Meanwhile, Mitch Vogel of Nintendo Life wrote that the game's "catchy music helps to make subsequent runs of a level feel a little less like busywork, while the inclusion of some house, rock, and drum & bass elements keep individual tracks feeling diverse and fresh." GamingTrend praised the music for matching with the flow of the controls, further noting that their favorite song was "Jig's Up, Penny" from the first world.
