= Patrice Désilets =

Canadian game designer (born 1974)

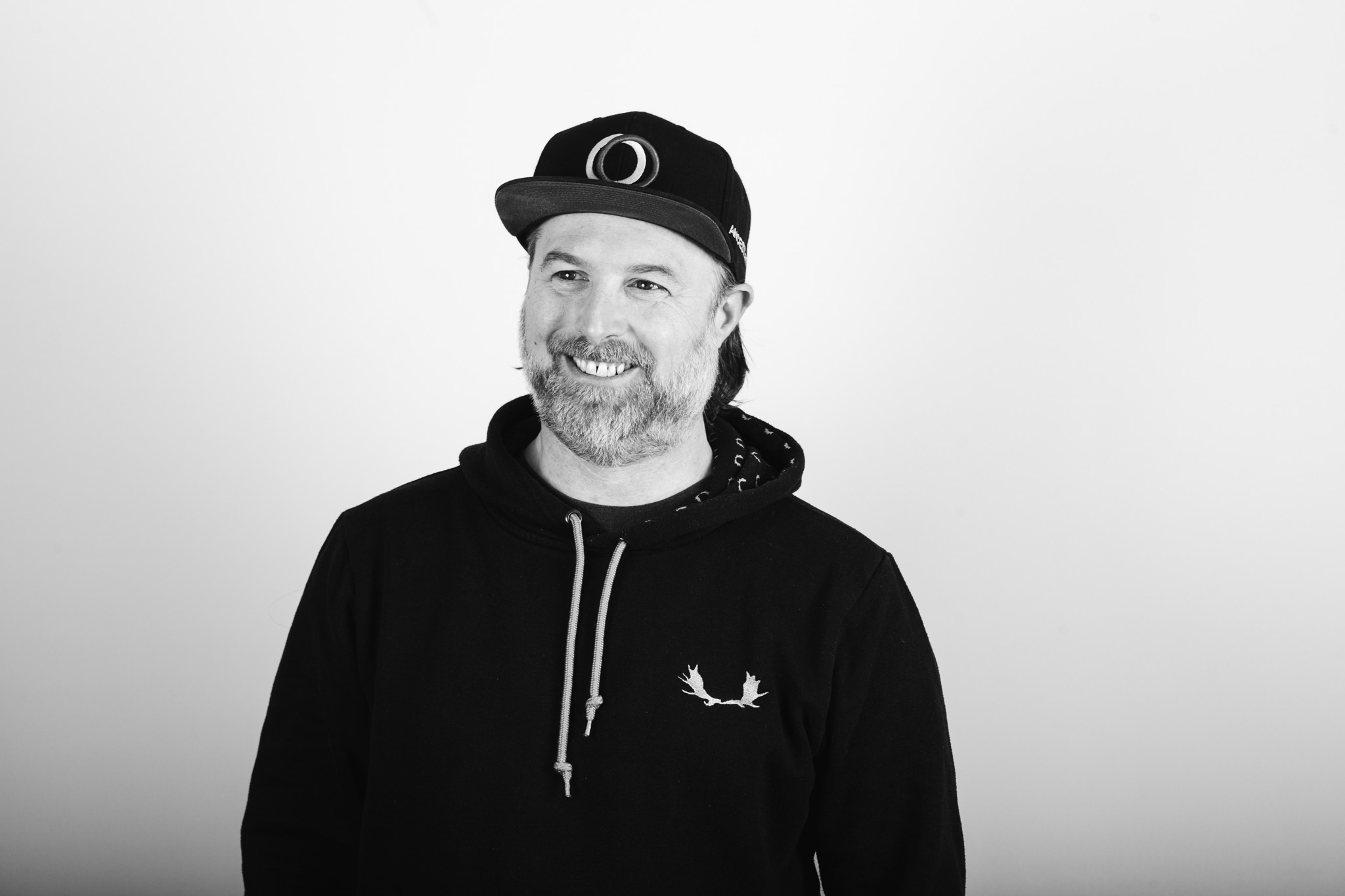
- Patrice Désilets' official portrait from 2023, created by Panache Digital Games.
- Born: 9 May 1974 (age 52); Saint-Jean-sur-Richelieu, Quebec, Canada
- Occupation: Video game designer
- Website: panachedigitalgames.com

Patrice Désilets (born 9 May 1974) is a Canadian game designer best known for creating the Assassin's Creed series. He served as creative director for Assassin's Creed, Assassin's Creed II, and Assassin's Creed: Brotherhood. He is also known for being the director of Ubisoft's Prince of Persia: The Sands of Time. In 2014, he founded the Montreal-based indie studio Panache Digital Games, where he worked on the games Ancestors: The Humankind Odyssey and 1666: Amsterdam.

== Biography ==
Born in 1974 at Saint-Jean-sur-Richelieu, Quebec, Désilets is the son of Jacques Désilets, mathematician and director of CEGEP, and Luce de Bellefeuille, Director General of the Secretariat for International Adoption. In 1996, Désilets earned his bachelor's degree in film studies and literature at University of Montreal, to which time prior, he was enrolled at the Collège Édouard-Montpetit. Coming from a background in film, he has used his creative vision to shape games in which he has taken a creative lead including 2007's Assassin's Creed and its 2009 sequel Assassin's Creed II. Désilets other credits include Assassin's Creed: Brotherhood, Prince of Persia: The Sands of Time, Disney's Donald Duck: Goin' Quackers, and Hype: The Time Quest.

=== Departure from Ubisoft ===
Désilets left Ubisoft in June 2010, which was confirmed by the company on June 13, 2010, looking for more creative independence. After one year away from the gaming industry, Patrice Désilets officially returned by joining THQ as Creative Director at their new Montreal based studio in June 2011. For two years at THQ Montreal, Désilets was working on a new project titled 1666 Amsterdam, leading a team of close to fifty people.

THQ declared bankruptcy under Chapter 11 in the United States in December 2012; in January 2013, THQ Montreal was sold off to Ubisoft in an auction. Ubisoft's first course of action after buying THQ Montreal was to immediately fire Patrice and keep the 1666 Amsterdam IP. When asked about it, Désilets said, "Contrary to any statements made earlier today, this morning I was terminated by Ubisoft. I was notified of this termination in person, handed a termination notice and was unceremoniously escorted out of the building by two guards without being able to say goodbye to my team or collect my personal belongings. This was not my decision. Ubisoft's actions are baseless and without merit. I intend to fight Ubisoft vigorously for my rights, for my team and for my game."

Following this, Désilets and Ubisoft came to an agreement in April 2016 in which Désilets won back all creative rights to 1666: Amsterdam.

=== Panache Digital Games ===
On December 14, 2014, Désilets and his team launched a new game development studio in Montreal called Panache Digital Games. They released their first project, Ancestors: The Humankind Odyssey in 2019. Their next title, 1666: Amsterdam, was announced at Summer Game Fest 2026 with a free prologue released that day. The game is currently in early access as of August 25, 2026.

== Games ==
Year	Title	Role
1999	Hype: The Time Quest	Designer
2000	Donald Duck: Goin' Quackers	Designer
2003	Prince of Persia: The Sands of Time	Creative director
2007	Assassin's Creed	Creative director
2009	Assassin's Creed II	Creative director
2010	Assassin's Creed: Brotherhood	Story
2019	Ancestors: The Humankind Odyssey	Creative director, president
2026	1666: Amsterdam	Creative director, president
