= Panache Digital Games =

Canadian video game developer

- Industry: Video game industry
- Founded: 2014; 12 years ago
- Founders: Patrice Désilets; Jean-François Boivin
- Headquarters: Montreal, Quebec, Canada
- Website: panachedigitalgames.com

Panache Digital Games (French: Panache Jeux Numériques) is a Canadian video game developer founded in 2014 and based in Montreal, Quebec, Canada.

== History ==
Panache Digital Games was co-founded by Patrice Désilets, creator of the Assassin's Creed series, and Jean-François Boivin, a former Ubisoft executive.

After nearly five years of development, the studio released its first game, Ancestors: The Humankind Odyssey, on 27 August 2019 for Microsoft Windows. The game was later released for PlayStation 4 and Xbox One on 6 December 2019 and was published by Private Division. Afterwards, Panache Digital Games began development on 1666: Amsterdam, a supernatural action-adventure game directed by Patrice Désilets. The game was officially revealed at Summer Game Fest in June 2026 and serves as a revival of the 1666 intellectual property originally created during Désilets' time at THQ Montreal. In October 2026, it was announced that a remaster of the game is set to release for Nintendo Switch 2, PlayStation 5 and Xbox Series X/S on December 8, 2026, with Fictions as publisher.

== Games developed ==
Title	Release date	Platforms	Publisher
Ancestors: The Humankind Odyssey	27 August 2019	Windows	Private Division
Ancestors: The Humankind Odyssey	6 December 2019	PlayStation 4, Xbox One	Private Division
Ancestors: The Humankind Odyssey	8 December 2026	Nintendo Switch 2, PlayStation 5, Xbox Series X/S	Fictions
1666: Amsterdam	TBA	Windows	Panache Digital Games
