= Time Quest =

Time Quest may refer to:

- Hype: The Time Quest, a computer game
- Time Travel Tondekeman, a science-fiction anime known as Time Quest outside Japan
