= 1666: Amsterdam =

Upcoming video game

- Developer: Panache Digital Games
- Director: Patrice Désilets
- Engine: Unreal Engine 5
- Release: Prologue: June 5, 2026; Early Access: August 25, 2026; Full release: TBA
- Genre: 3rd person Action-adventure game
- Mode: Single-player

1666: Amsterdam is an upcoming third-person action-adventure video game developed and self-published by Panache Digital Games. It entered Early Access on 25 August 2026; a date for its final release has not yet been announced.

== Development history ==
According to Patrice Désilets, he got the idea for 1666: Amsterdam in 2011 during a trip to Amsterdam. Désilets later began work on 1666: Amsterdam in 2013. Désilets joined THQ's Montreal studio and worked on the game until THQ went belly up and their Montreal studio was purchased by Ubisoft for $2.5 Million. Ubisoft later fired Désilets and took the rights to 1666: Amsterdam, which caused development to halt. Désilets later sued Ubisoft and eventually won back the rights to his game. The game was officially announced at Summer Game Fest in June 2026.

== Plot ==
The story centers around a witch known as Noa the Collector, who uses witchcraft to investigate demonic entities hiding themselves as humans during the Dutch Golden Age. Parts of the story are split between three eras, the Dutch Golden Age in 1666, the turn of the millennium in 1999, and the present day.

== Release ==
The demo for 1666: Amsterdam was released on Steam on June 5, 2026. 1666: Amsterdam was later released on both Steam and the Epic Games Store in early access on August 25, 2026.

== Initial reception ==
The early access release of 1666: Amsterdam was criticized for containing numerous bugs on launch as well as several instances of FPS drops during gameplay. While the early access version of the game was praised by PC Gamer for having interesting ideas, it was also criticized for poorly combining and executing them. Wiktor Reinfuss of Cosmic Circus praised the game for its combination of ideas but criticized the writing in relation to the game's story and characters. Way toomany games praised the game for its interesting story and atmospheric setting but criticized the combat, camera and movement controls for feeling stiff and clunky.

== Future plans for franchise ==
According to Patrice Désilets, 1666: Amsterdam is supposed to be the first game in a "Global Witchcraft Franchise."
