= Wētā Workshop =

New Zealand special effects company

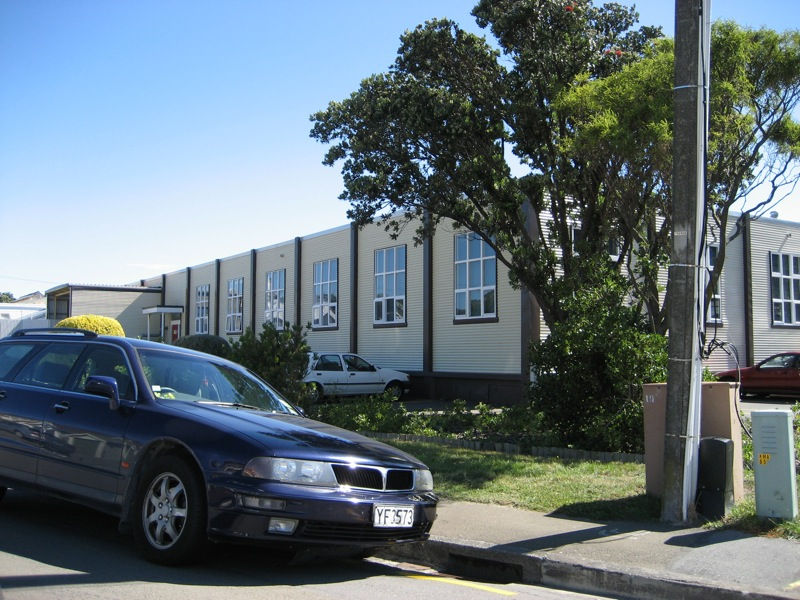
- Wētā Workshop headquarters
- Formerly: RT Effects (1987–1993); Weta Workshop (1993–2021)
- Type: Private
- Industry: Special effects; Animation; Concept design; Production design; Costume design; Armour design; Props; Prosthetic makeup; Miniatures; Animatronics; Sculptures; Immersive experiences; Video games; Board games; Collectibles; Books
- Founded: 1987; 39 years ago
- Founder: Richard Taylor; Tania Rodger
- Headquarters: Miramar, Wellington, New Zealand
- Key people: Richard Taylor (CEO)
- Owner: Richard Taylor; Tania Rodger
- Website: wetaworkshop.com

Wētā Workshop is a New Zealand creative studio and special effects house based in Miramar, Wellington. It is privately owned by co-founders, Sir Richard Taylor and Tania Rodger. It is independent from Wētā FX (formerly Wētā Digital), a separate company also founded by Taylor, alongside filmmaker Sir Peter Jackson, which specialises in digital visual effects.

Wētā Workshop provides concept design and physical special effects for film and television. The studio became well known for its Academy Award-winning work on The Lord of the Rings film trilogy.

Beyond its film and television contributions, the company has diversified into video game development, immersive experiences, concept designs, the production of board games and books, creation of large-scale public sculptures, and manufacture of high-end collectibles for fans. It also operates visitor attractions in Wellington and Auckland.

== History ==
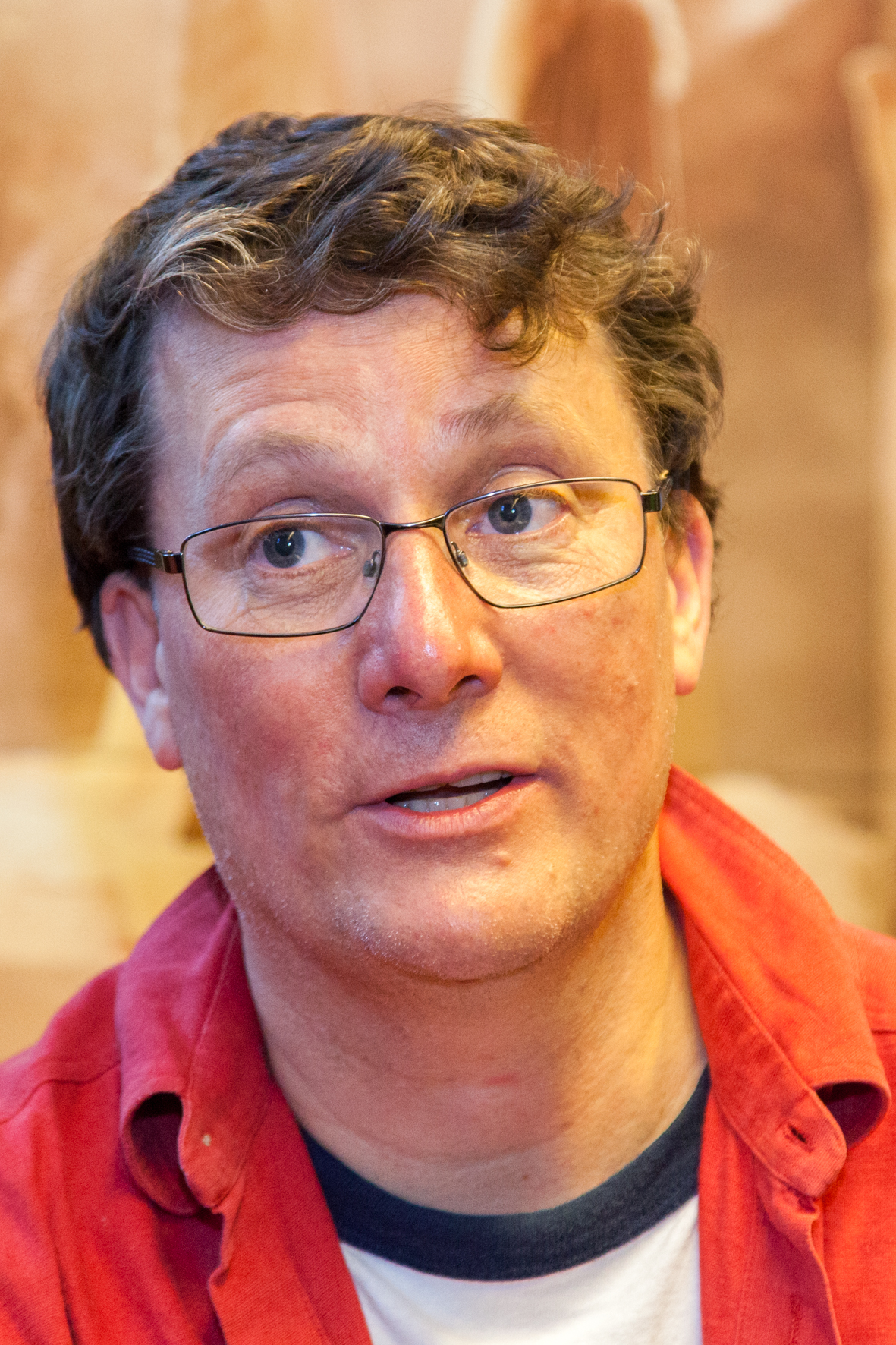
Sir Richard Taylor, co-founder and owner of Wētā Workshop

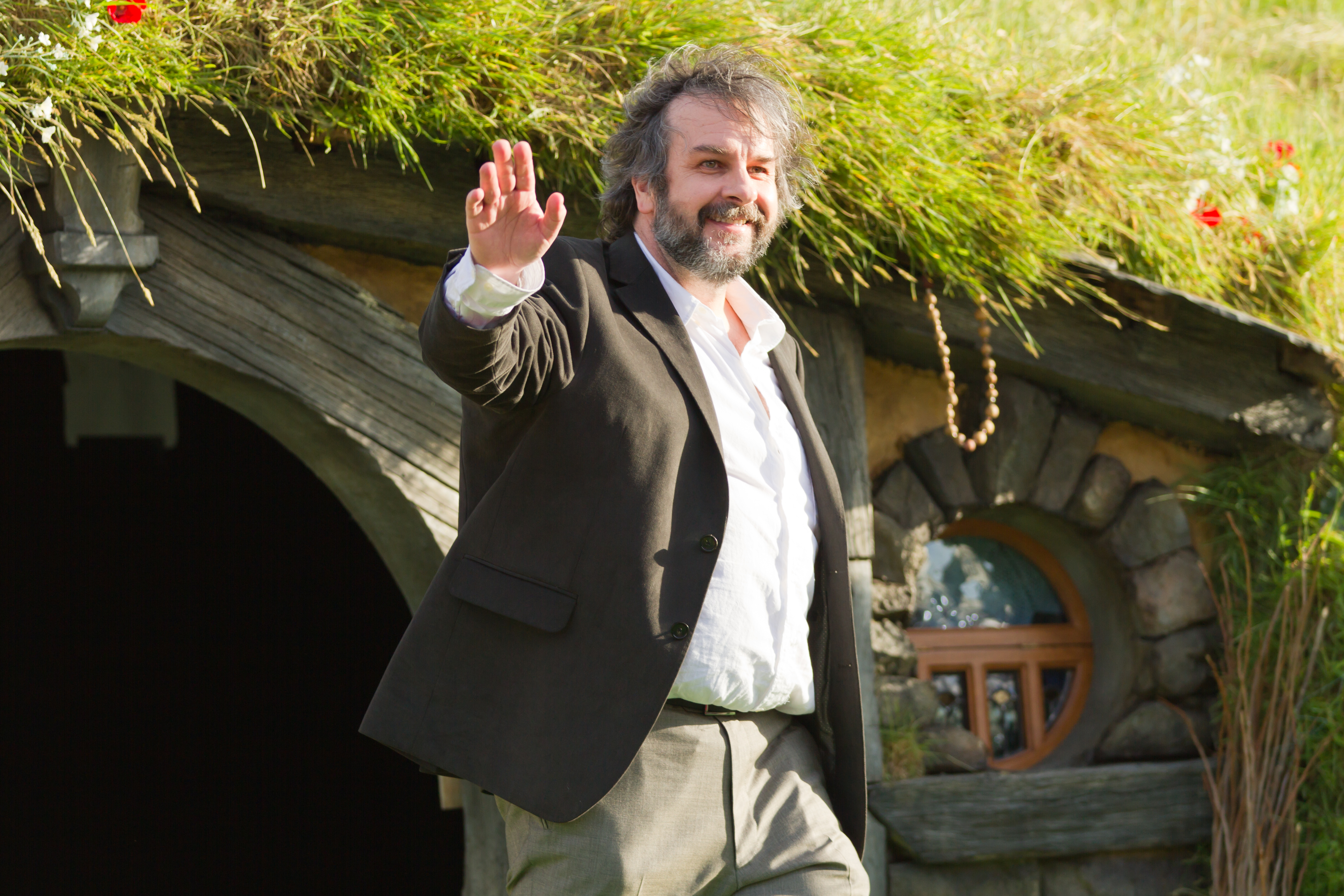
Peter Jackson was a director of Wētā Workshop from its formal founding in 1993 until his resignation at the end of 2015.

Founded in 1987 by Richard Taylor and Tania Rodger as RT Effects, the company was renamed Weta Workshop in 1993 upon the entry of filmmaker Peter Jackson and film editor Jamie Selkirk as partners. Peter Jackson remained a director until 2015, and is no longer an owner of Wētā Workshop.

The initial operations of the company were defined by a series of early television projects, notably including the creation of creatures and makeup effects for the series Hercules: The Legendary Journeys and Xena: Warrior Princess. The studio simultaneously expanded into cinema, providing special effects for Peter Jackson films such as Heavenly Creatures and The Frighteners. The workshop expanded into CGI in 1993 by founding a separate visual effects company known as Weta Digital, which was then renamed in 2021 as Wētā FX. This company operates independently as a separate entity. Both businesses are named after the New Zealand wētā, one of the world's largest insects. Macrons were added to the companies' names in 2021.

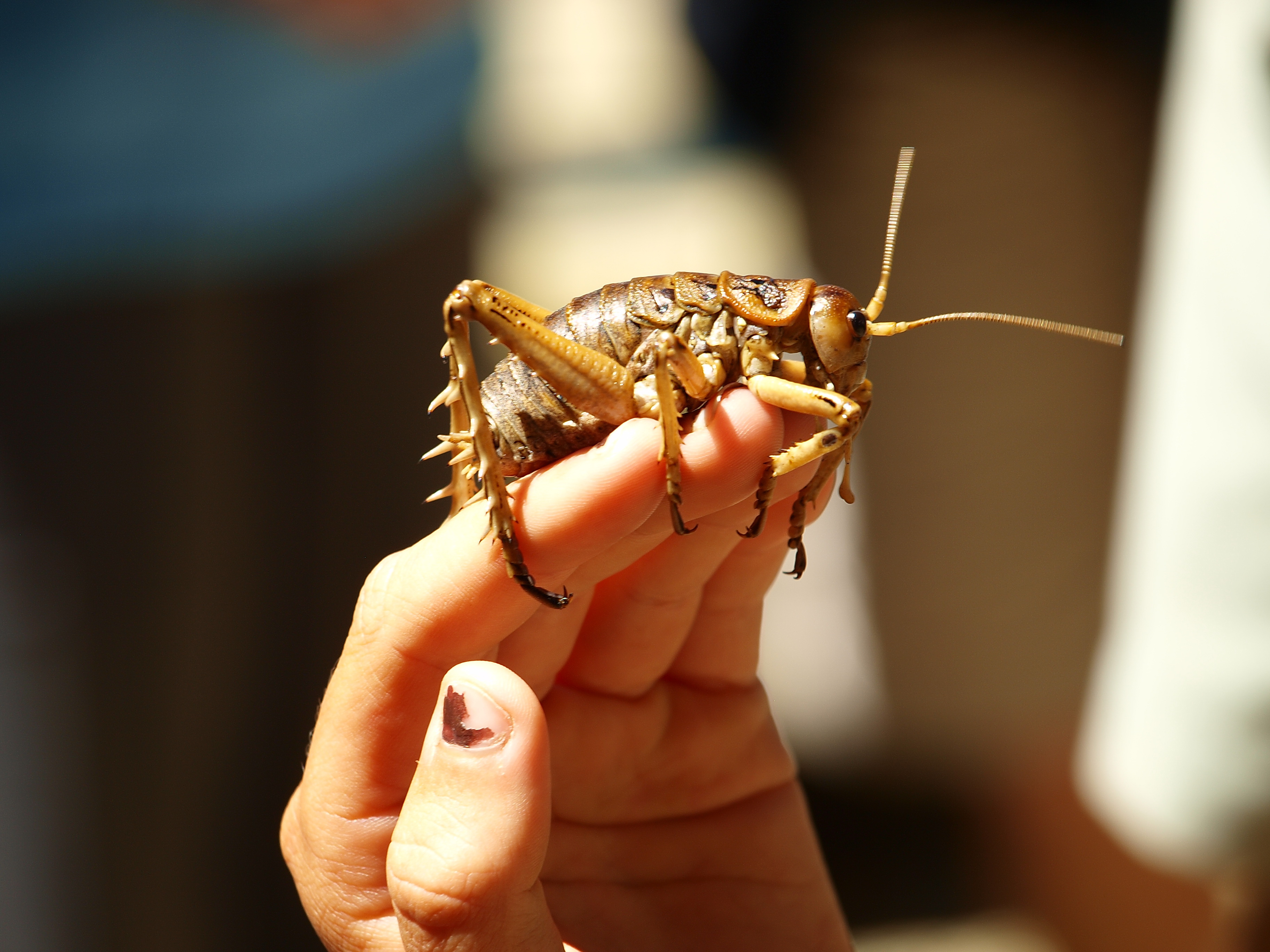
The company is named after the New Zealand wētā, one of the world's largest insects.

Wētā Workshop achieved international prominence for its extensive contributions to director Peter Jackson's The Lord of the Rings and The Hobbit film trilogies, where the studio was responsible for manufacturing the physical sets, costumes, armour, weapons, creatures, and miniatures. This work earned the studio's crew multiple Academy Awards, with co-founder Richard Taylor individually winning Oscars for Best Makeup and Best Visual Effects for The Fellowship of the Ring, as well as Best Costume Design and Best Makeup for The Return of the King. These accolades established the workshop as an industry leader in practical effects and cinematic world-building.

Following success with The Lord of the Rings trilogy, Taylor won a fifth Academy Award in 2006 for Best Visual Effects for his work on Jackson's 2005 remake of King Kong.

Wētā Workshop continues to provide extensive conceptual design and special effects for major Hollywood and international productions. Notable film projects included The Chronicles of Narnia series, James Cameron's Avatar series, Neill Blomkamp's District 9 (2009), Elysium (2013), Chappie (2015), and Denis Villeneuve's Dune (2021) and Dune: Part Two (2024).

Wētā Workshop's video games division was founded in 2012 and has produced numerous games including the augmented reality project Dr. Grordbort's Invaders for Magic Leap and the video game Tales of the Shire in 2025.

In 2015 Wētā Workshop created its first immersive experience, Gallipoli: The Scale of Our War in 2015 with Te Papa, which included giant figures 2.4 times human size. Since then, the company has worked on other immersive experiences including the Alif Mobility Pavilion at Dubai Expo 2020 and Traditional Chinese Medicine Cultural Experience Centre in Zhuhai, China. Wētā Workshop has won three Themed Entertainment Association Awards for Outstanding Achievement for: Gallipoli: The Scale of our War in 2017, Wētā Workshop Unleashed in 2021, and Aura: The Forest at the Edge of the Sky in 2024.

Wētā Workshop made its American musical theatre debut in 2022 with Workshop designer Rebekah Tisch serving as the art director for the musical stage production of Other World at Delaware Theatre Company, creating a digital world for live stage.

=== Peter Jackson and Wētā Workshop ===
Sir Peter Jackson is a co-founder of Wētā Workshop. While the company was originally established in 1987 as RT Effects by Richard Taylor and Tania Rodger, Jackson formally joined the partnership in 1993 to facilitate the production of complex physical effects, costumes, and creatures for his feature film Heavenly Creatures. This collaboration transformed the small operation into Weta (later Wētā) Workshop, which eventually became a cornerstone of the global filmmaking industry through its extensive work on The Lord of the Rings and The Hobbit trilogies.

Jackson served as a director of the company for 22 years, providing strategic oversight during its rapid expansion into miniatures, armour smithing, and high-end collectibles.

On 31 December 2015, Jackson officially resigned from the board of directors, a decision prompted by the introduction of the Health and Safety at Work Act 2015 passed by the New Zealand Parliament. This legislative shift introduced stringent personal liability for company directors regarding workplace safety, including the potential for significant fines and imprisonment for "officers" who failed to exercise due diligence. Because Jackson’s primary focus remained on film direction and digital production rather than the day-to-day industrial manufacturing operations occurring on the Workshop floor, he stepped down to mitigate personal legal risk while maintaining his financial interests.

Despite his resignation from the board of Wētā Workshop, Jackson remains the owner of Wētā FX. Wētā FX is a separate digital VFX company.

== Innovations ==
=== Chainmail ===
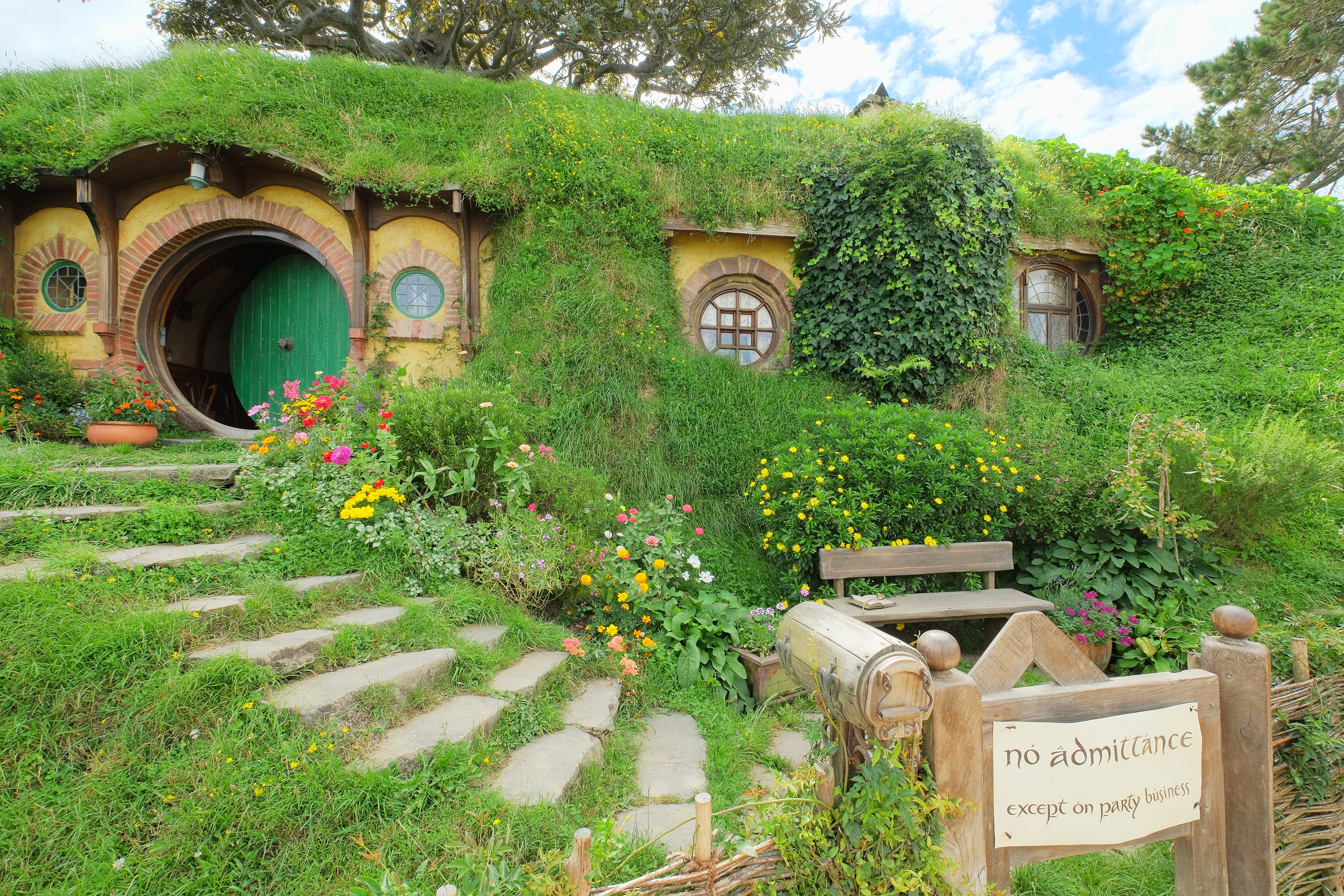
Hobbiton Movie Set, designed and crafted by the artists at Wētā Workshop

For The Lord of the Rings film trilogy, realistic-looking, lightweight chainmail devised by creature, armour, and weapons art director Kayne Horsham was made for the lead actors and for the hundreds of extras that appeared in the films. PVC pipe was cut into rings, assembled by hand into a semblance of armour, and then electroplated. A total of 82.9 million links were manufactured from 7 miles (11 km) of PVC pipe. Lord of the Rings actor Viggo Mortensen nicknamed the chainmail 'Kayne's-mail' after its inventor. Horsham later improved his chainmail creation technique and patented it as Kaynemaile.

Wētā Workshop makes chainmail (branded as Tenzan Chain Maille) for film and creative industries using new techniques developed in-house. PVC injection was used for the armour in Kingdom of Heaven, giving better results than the process for The Lord of the Rings. It produces aluminium or steel chainmail for high-impact stunt work.

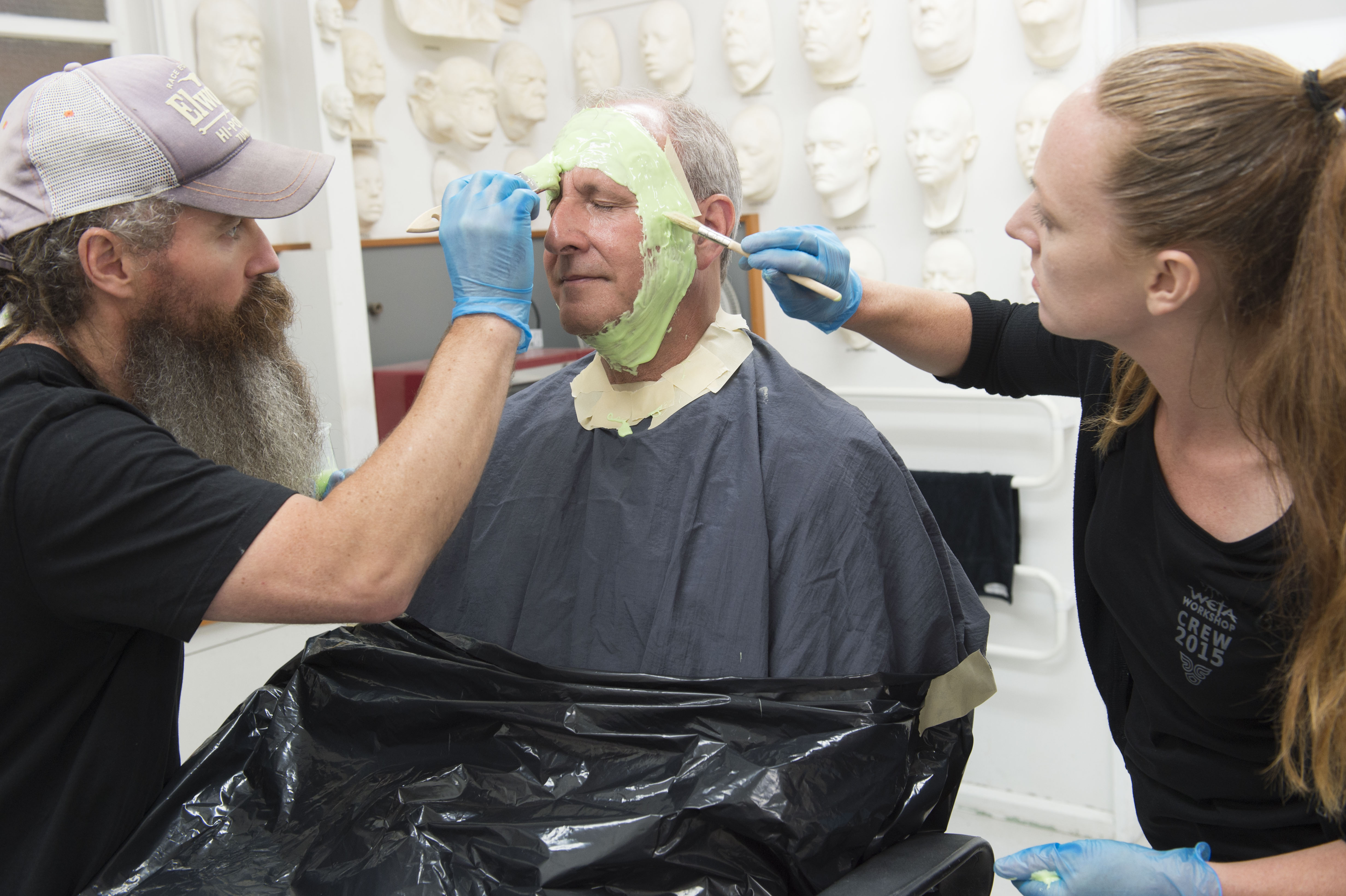
A technician at Wētā Workshop performs a life-cast to create a mould of a face.

=== Bigatures ===
The term 'bigature' is Wētā Workshop's nickname for a very large miniature model. They were used in The Lord of the Rings film trilogy, with the largest model measuring some 9 metres (30 ft) tall. Extensive computer graphics techniques and computer-controlled cameras were used to seamlessly mesh the bigature photography with live actors and scenes.

Bigatures used in The Lord of the Rings film trilogy included models of:

- Rivendell – Elrond's city for the Elves
- Caras Galadhon – Galadriel's city in Lothlórien
- Argonath – the gateway into Gondor, two statues of Elendil and Isildur
- Helm's Deep – the mountain fortress of the Rohirrim
- Osgiliath – the ruined City of Gondor
- Minas Tirith – the White City of Gondor
- Orthanc – Saruman's tower
- Cirith Ungol – the tower that guards the pass of Shelob
- Minas Morgul – Sauron's 'Dead City'
- Barad-dûr – Sauron's massive tower
- The Black Gate – the gate guarding the gap between the Ered Lithui and the Ephel Dúath
- Grond – the battering ram that smashed down the gates of Minas Tirith

=== Weta Legs ===
'Weta Legs' was a "low profile, professional grade reverse leg stilt" developed by Wētā technicians and manufactured by Performing Legs Ltd. Designed and largely hand-made by Wētā Workshop's sculptor-designer Kim Graham, these digitigrade leg extensions were intended for "creature and costume performances in movies, television, theatre, circus, street performances and other creative performances".

Originally reserved for commercial film and television projects, Wētā brought them to market in limited quantities for online purchase by members of the public in 2010. With the ability to take extra prosthetics such as layers of fur or skin "to resemble a digitigrade leg, from canine and feline to fantastical demons, dragons, satyrs and even robots", these devices were promoted as being easy to get used to because they allowed for realistic and natural movement due to knee and ankle joints. Citing low pre-order numbers, Wētā cancelled the commercial production of Weta Legs in June 2010. A revised version was later produced by Area 51, a British company.

== Wētā Workshop Game Studio ==
In 2012, Wētā Workshop expanded its operations by establishing Wētā Workshop Game Studio, a division focused on developing original interactive titles and providing conceptual design services for the video game industry. In 2018, Weta Gameshop, described as possibly "the world's first specialist mixed reality development studio", was opened in partnership with Magic Leap. In the field of mixed reality and emerging technology, the studio developed the award-winning title Dr. Grordbort's Invaders, a flagship augmented reality action game created specifically for the Magic Leap platform. Many staff were laid off in 2020.

Regarding its work on Middle-earth projects, the studio's Design Studio provided extensive concept art for Monolith Productions' Middle-earth: Shadow of Mordor and its sequel Middle-earth: Shadow of War, specifically influencing the visual identity of characters, weaponry, and environmental assets. The division also internally developed Tales of the Shire, a cosy life-simulation game that allows players to experience the daily lives of hobbits within the world of J.R.R. Tolkien.

The studio has also contributed significant design work to the Call of Duty franchise, including providing character and world concept design for Call of Duty: Vanguard and developing character and weapon skins for Call of Duty: Modern Warfare.

== Sculptures and large-scale installations ==
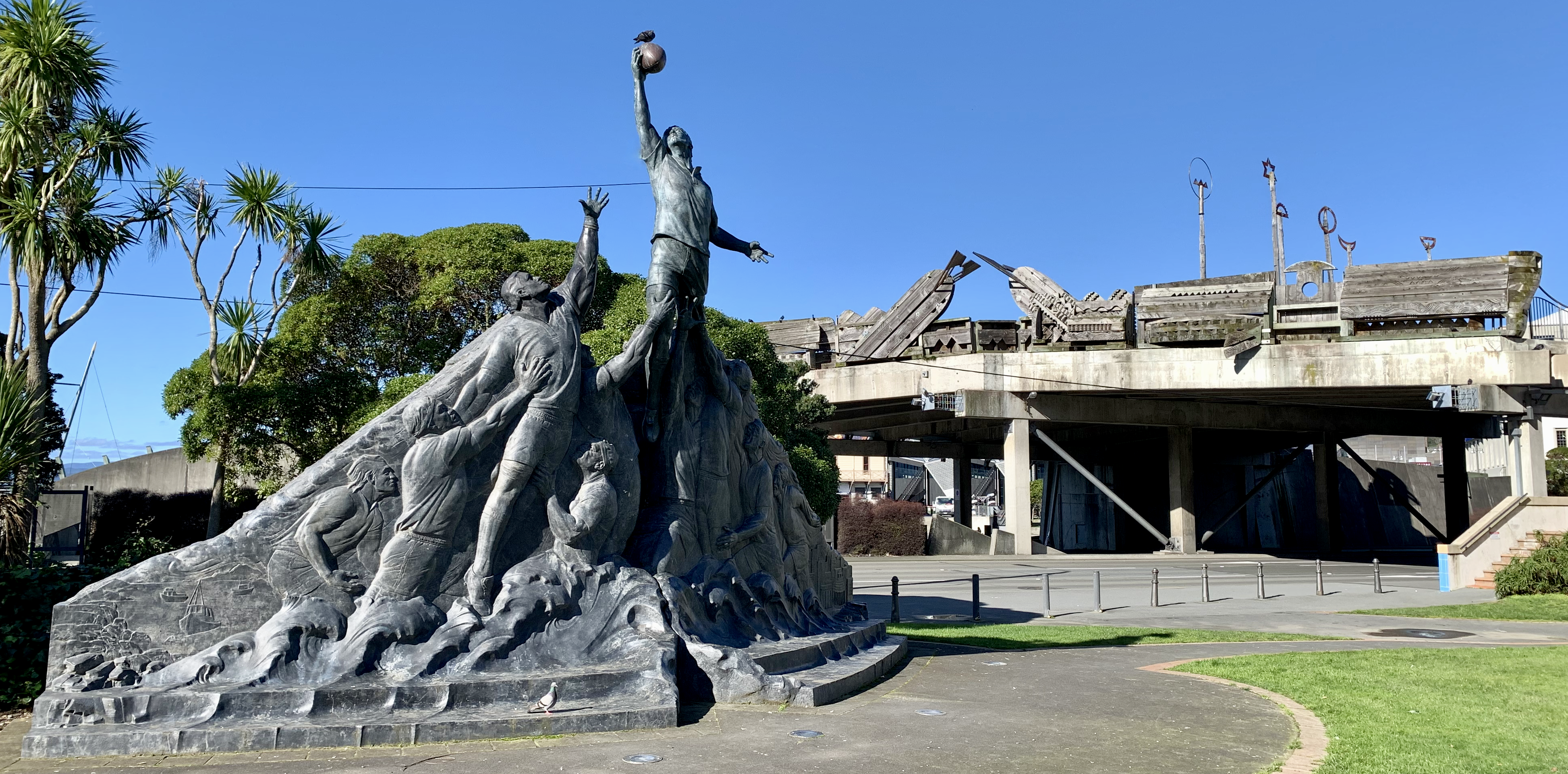
Wētā Workshop sculpture created for the 2011 Rugby World Cup in Wellington

In addition to its work in film and television, Wētā Workshop maintains a division focused on public and private commissions, specializing in large-scale sculptures and museum exhibits. This department applies cinematic fabrication techniques, such as high-detail prosthetics and structural engineering, to permanent physical installations.

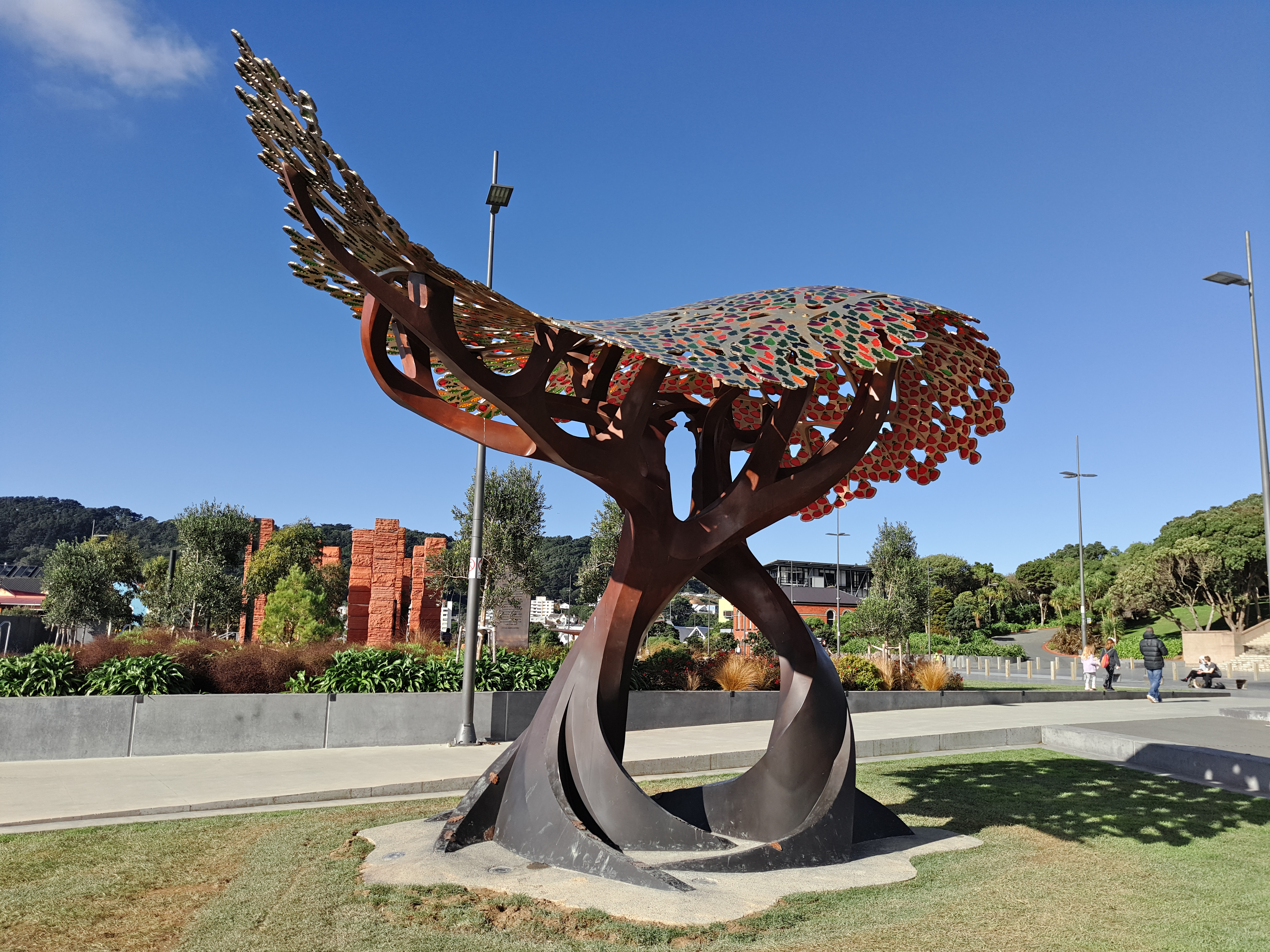
The United Kingdom memorial at Pukeahu National War Memorial Park

The workshop’s private and institutional commissions range from bespoke bronze statues for individual collectors to collaborative projects with corporate and governmental organisations. These include design and fabrication for the Traditional Chinese Medicine Cultural Experience Center in Zhuhai and the redevelopment of the National Aquarium of New Zealand in Napier.

For the 2016 film Warcraft, Wētā Workshop collaborated with Madame Tussauds to create an immersive experience featuring a life-sized figure of the Orc chieftain Durotan, which stood over 2.1 m (7 ft) tall and was constructed using more than 90 silicone moulds and yak hair to achieve a realistic appearance. They also produced a massive bronze statue of the character Orgrim Doomhammer for the Blizzard Entertainment, the developer of the Warcraft video game franchise, at their headquarters in California.

A significant portion of Wētā Workshop's museum work is represented by the 'Gallipoli: The Scale of Our War' exhibition at Te Papa in Wellington, featuring human figures crafted at 2.4 times life size. The exhibition opened in 2015 and was intended to be in place for four years, but has proved so popular that Te Papa has extended it until 2032. A museum representative said that the exhibition had been Te Papa's most successful ever, with an estimated 5 million visitors to the end of 2025, and Sir Richard Taylor stated that "We wanted to share a deep respect to the memories of the men and women who served and sacrificed so much - on a scale that they deserved."

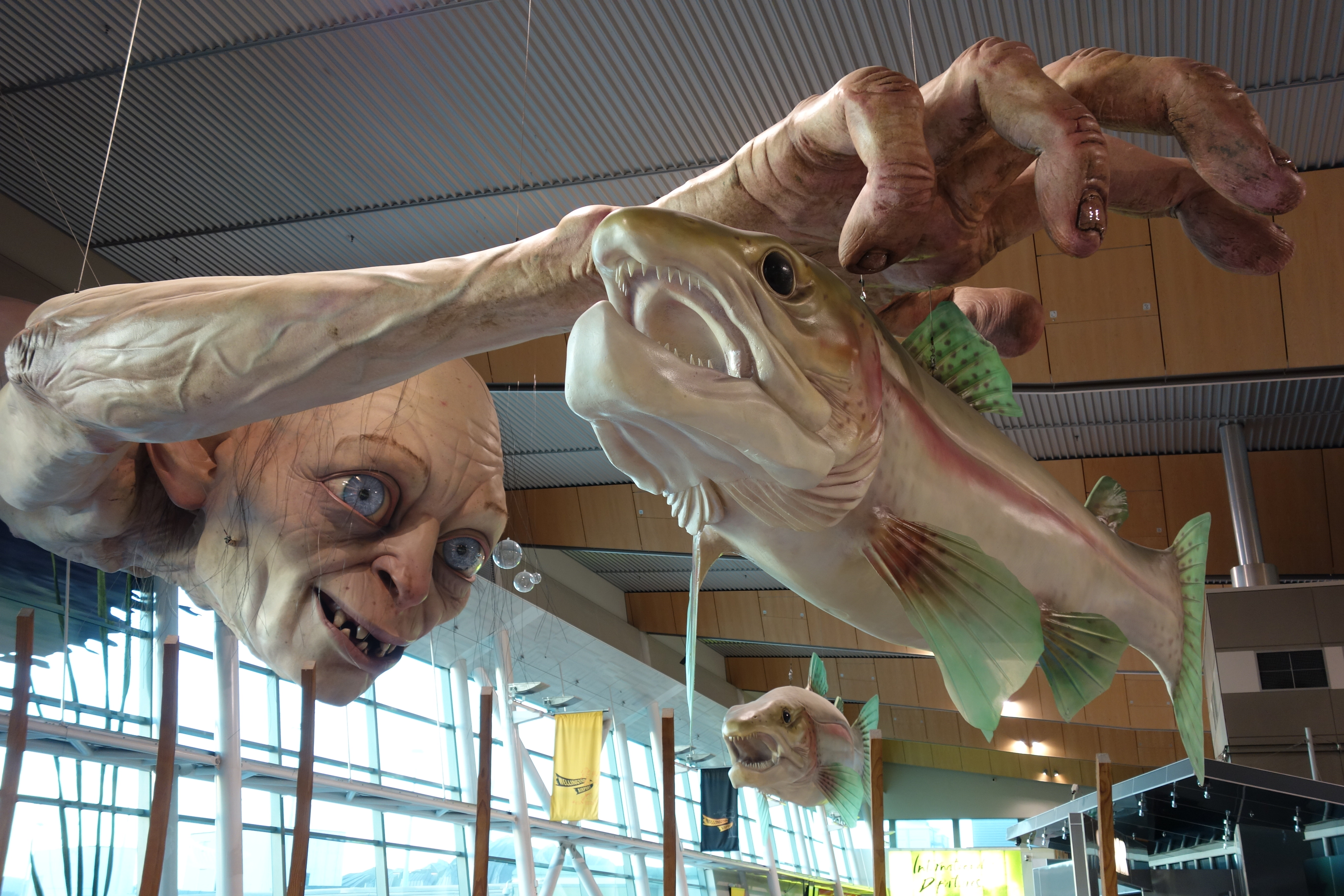
13-metre-long Gollum sculpture at Wellington Airport

The company's public work includes various urban projects, such as the 2011 Rugby World Cup sculpture in Wellington and several significant memorial and collaborative art projects across New Zealand and abroad. At Pukeahu National War Memorial Park, the workshop fabricated the United Kingdom Memorial, which features intertwined bronze trees representing the royal oak and the pōhutukawa. In Gisborne, the workshop crafted a life-sized bronze tribute to Murray Ball's Footrot Flats comic strip, featuring the characters Wal and Dog.

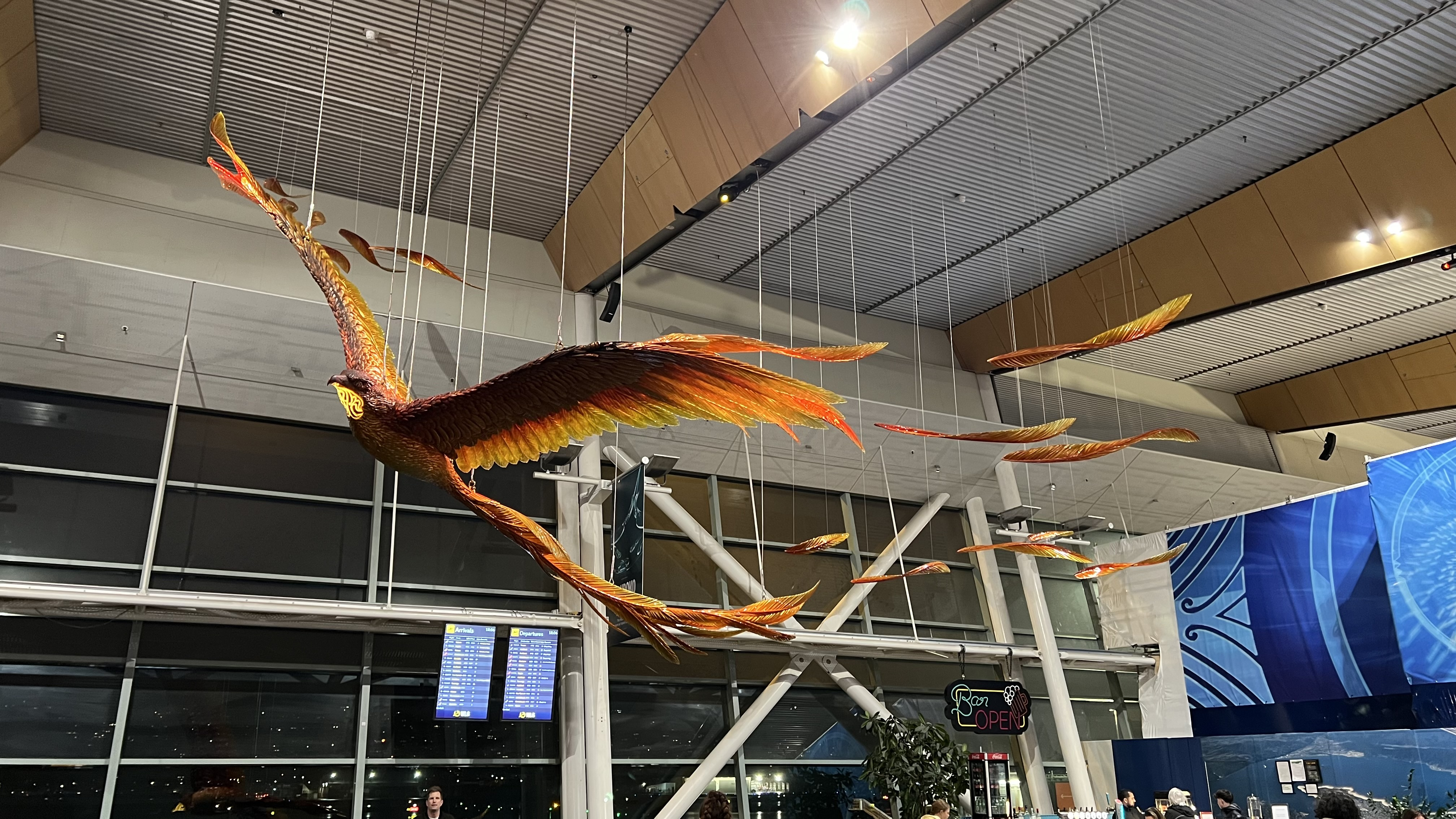
15-metre-long Manu Muramura sculpture installed at Wellington Airport

The workshop is also responsible for the "bigature" Middle-earth displays at Wellington Airport, which include a 13-metre-long sculpture of Gollum created to promote the release of The Hobbit: An Unexpected Journey. In August 2025, the facility expanded its presence at the terminal with the unveiling of Manu Muramura, a 15-metre-long illuminated sculpture installed above the main concourse. Developed in collaboration with artist Manukorihi Winiata, the artwork replaced the airport's previous The Hobbit-themed eagle sculptures, which had been a fixture of the terminal for 12 years alongside the Gollum installation. The new installation is based on a Māori legend about a local water spirit (taniwha) whose spirit is said to have ascended in the form of a bird.

For the opening of the Natural History Museum Abu Dhabi in November 2025, Wētā Workshop produced more than 300 models and dioramas. Designed to illustrate natural history and prehistoric life, these educational fabrications span from small-scale fauna to large museum features, including a 15-metre-long Shastasaurus.

== Collectibles ==
=== Sideshow Weta Collectibles (2001–2005) ===
Sideshow Weta Collectibles operated as a joint venture between the American manufacturer Sideshow Collectibles and Wētā Workshop.

Formed in 2001 to capitalise on the release of The Lord of the Rings film trilogy, the partnership combined Wētā Workshop’s authentic film-prop expertise with Sideshow’s global distribution and marketing infrastructure. The collaboration is best known for producing high-end polystone statues, busts, and prop replicas that set a new industry standard for cinematic accuracy and detail.

The formal partnership between Sideshow Collectibles and Wētā Workshop concluded on 1 July 2005, allowing both entities to pursue independent creative and commercial interests. To mark the end of the collaboration, the final product released was a 1:6 scale polystone statue of director Peter Jackson. The figure depicted Jackson in his cameo role as a Corsair of Umbar from the film The Lord of the Rings: The Return of the King.

=== Wētā Workshop Collectibles (2005–2009) ===
Wētā Workshop re-established its independent consumer products division in 2005 following the conclusion of its joint venture with Sideshow. In 2005-2006 Wētā made collectibles for Kong: The 8th Wonder of the World and The Chronicles of Narnia: The Lion, The Witch, and The Wardrobe, as well as Superman Returns in 2006. The company also made collectibles for Hellgate: London in 2007/2008, and Doctor Who in 2008/2009.

=== Wētā Collectibles (since 2009) ===
In 2009, Wētā announced its return to creating collectibles based on The Lord of the Rings film trilogy after securing a new licensing agreement with Warner Bros. Consumer Products. The workshop produces high-end collectibles designed and sculpted by the same artists who create props and practical effects for major film productions.

Wētā Workshop’s consumer products division includes several distinct lines of collectibles which initially derived from its work in film and television. The Masters Collection consists of large-scale, limited-edition statues produced with an emphasis on technical detail and complex character arrangements. These mixed-media figures were often hand-painted by the same artists who work on the studio's props and miniatures to ensure a high level of craftsmanship.

Currently pre-production prototypes for all of their collectibles are painted by the Wētā Workshop paint department, who also paint the film props and physical items for other projects Wētā Workshop contributes to. Both Wētā Workshop and manufacture partners will paint the statues by hand.

The Classic Series is a line within their 1:6 scale statue range that focuses on more simplistic 'museum poses' with minimal base elements, and are open edition, as opposed to their other 1:6 scale statues that have limited edition sizes. This line has mainly depicted characters from Middle-earth. Within the wider 1:6 range, Wētā Workshop have created statues from a variety of franchises, including The Dark Crystal, Labyrinth, Tomb Raider, and Warhammer 40,000.

Additionally, the studio produces Mini Epics, a line of stylized vinyl figures, and Prop Replicas created using the original digital and physical assets from film production. Wētā Workshop created a line of Mini Epics for the TV show Stranger Things in 2021.

In 2018 Wētā Workshop began working with Crystal Dynamics on a series of limited-edition 1:4 Scale statues, Mini Epics (which are stylized vinyl figures) and miniature statues depicting Tomb Raider character, Lara Croft. The product range went on to include prop replicas of Lara Croft’s Recurve Bow and Arrow from Tomb Raider’s survivor trilogy, and her signature jade pendant.

In 2023 Wētā Workshop announced a partnership with Games Workshop to produce Warhammer Collectibles, including a 1:6 scale figures of Lieutenant Demetrian Titus and Abbadon the Despoiler from Warhammer 40k, Warhammer helms and Skragrott the Loon King from the Age of Sigmar.

In 2024 Wētā Workshop launched its first Lore Olympus Collectible, based on the popular Webtoon Comic by author Rachel Smythe. The limited-edition collectible, Hades and Perspone First Kiss, was sculpted by Wētā Workshop veteran Brigitte Wuest, who also worked on The Lord of the Rings films.

== Publications ==
Wētā Workshop set up a publishing arm around 2004, operating as a specialist publisher and book packager that produces highly detailed volumes documenting the technical and artistic processes of film production. Unlike standard licensed tie-ins, these books are authored and designed in-house by the studio's own concept artists, ensuring a high degree of accuracy regarding the props, costumes, and creatures created for the screen. The first book published by Wētā Workshop was The World of Kong: A Natural History of Skull Island, which was released on 9 December 2005 with a print run of 30,000 copies. The book, written by Wētā designer Daniel Falconer, imitates a 19th-century naturalist's field book as if the character Carl Denham, who took King Kong to New York, had gone back to Skull Island as part of an expedition.

The studio's bibliography includes the Chronicles series, a six-volume collection detailing the design history of The Hobbit film trilogy. The first volume (The Hobbit: An Unexpected Journey: Chronicles: Art and Design), compiled by Daniel Falconer, was released early in 2013.

In addition to film-related books, Wētā Workshop publishes original intellectual property, such as the satirical Dr. Grordbort's series. The first in this series was Doctor Grordbort's Contrapulatronic Dingus Directory, an antique-style catalogue of steampunk weapons devised by Greg Broadmore, which was released in April 2008.

The company typically uses a co-publishing and distribution model, maintaining creative control while partnering with international publishers like HarperCollins, Dark Horse Comics, and Titan Books for global retail.

== Tours ==
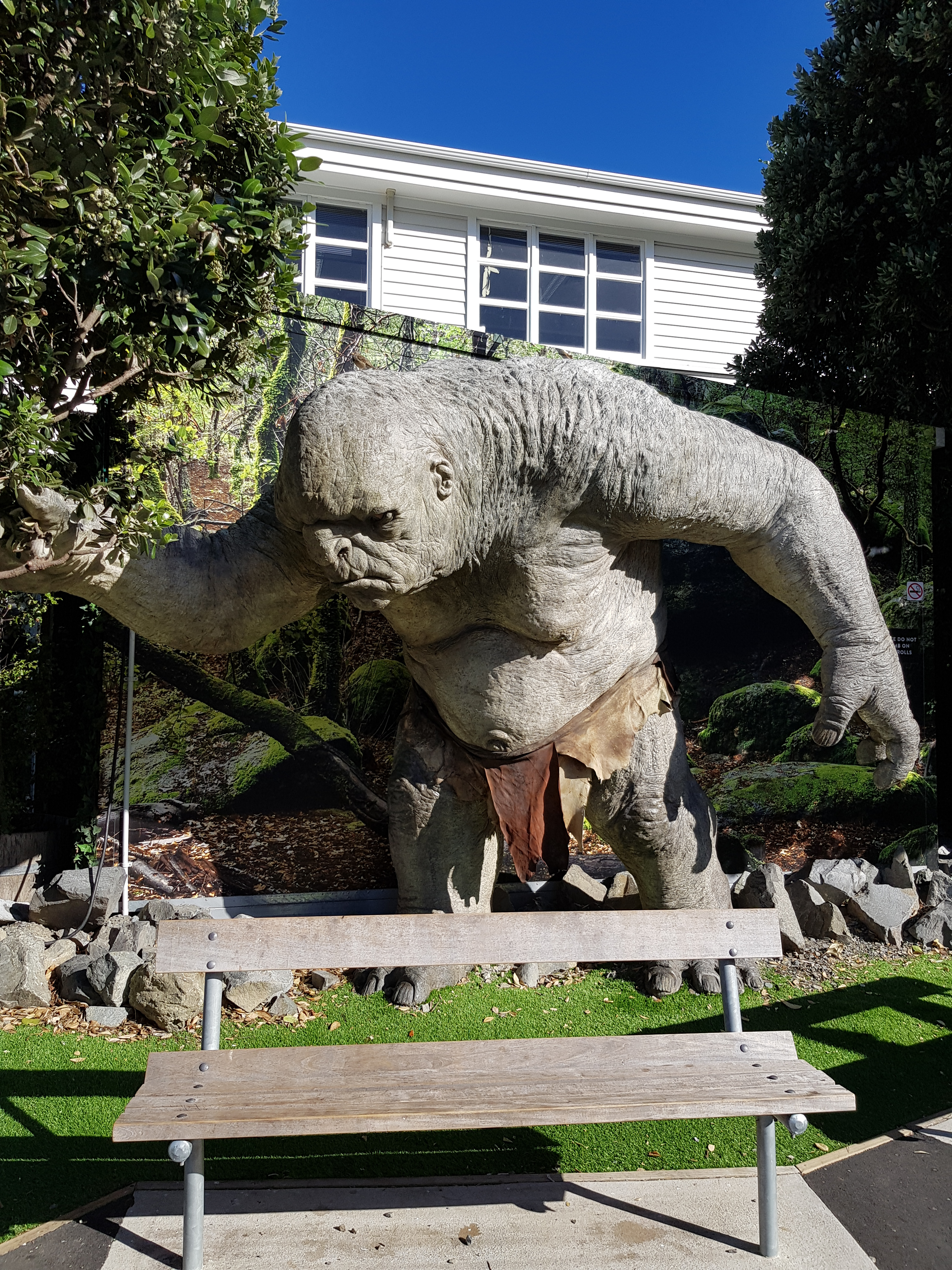
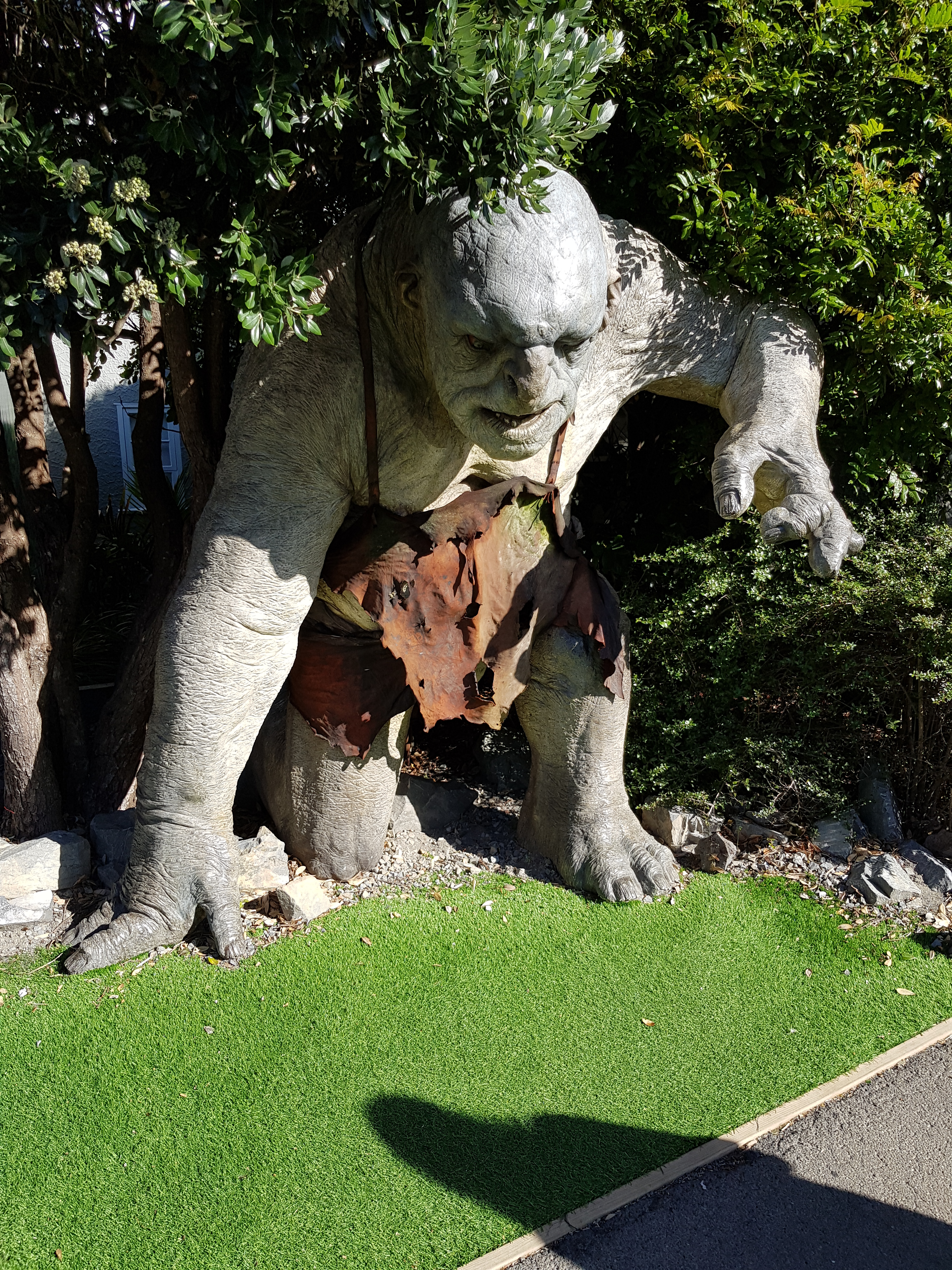
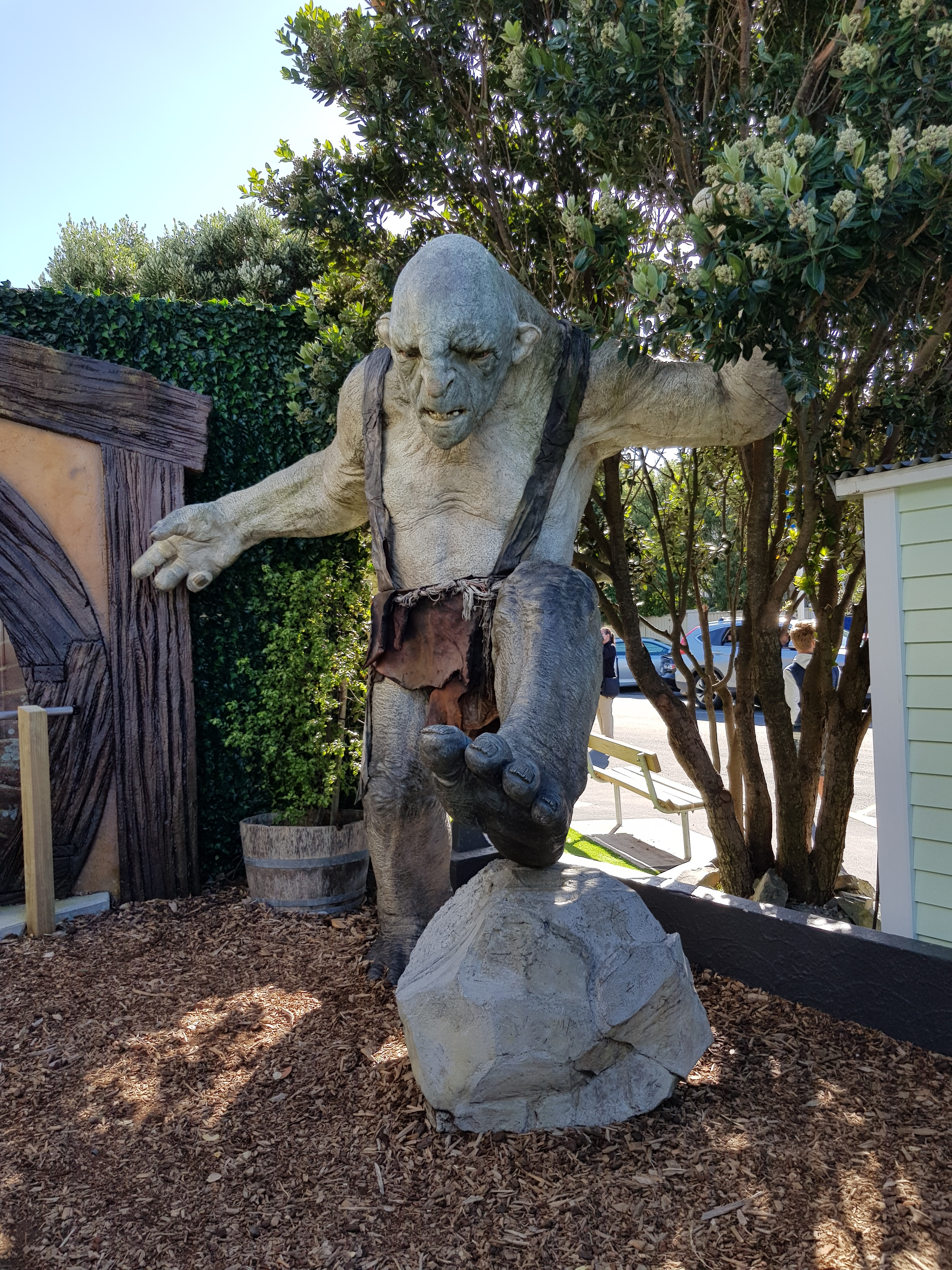
Life-sized sculptures of the three trolls—Tom, Bert, and William—from The Hobbit film trilogy, situated in front of the Wētā Workshop facility in Wellington

Wētā Workshop offers two distinct tourism experiences in New Zealand that focus on creativity, movie making and the artistry of practical film effects and prop manufacturing.

=== The Wētā Cave, Wellington ===
The Wētā Cave opened in 2008. It serves as the public entry point for the company's Wellington tours, functioning as a retail space. Entry to the Cave is free of charge, which allows visitors to view a variety of collectibles and prop replicas without a tour ticket. By 2018 there were 200,000 visitors per annum.

The exterior is marked by three life-sized stone trolls, which are frequently photographed. Inside, there are costumes from The Lord of the Rings film franchise on display including a set of Númenórean Armour from The Fellowship of the Ring.

The retail area carries a range of products, from themed apparel and pins to limited-edition statues, Wētā Workshop merchandise and handcrafted prop replicas. Staff are available to provide information regarding the items on display, many of which were created by the same artists who work on the films. The interior also features several large-scale character sculptures, including Gollum and Lurtz, which are available for public viewing and photograhs.

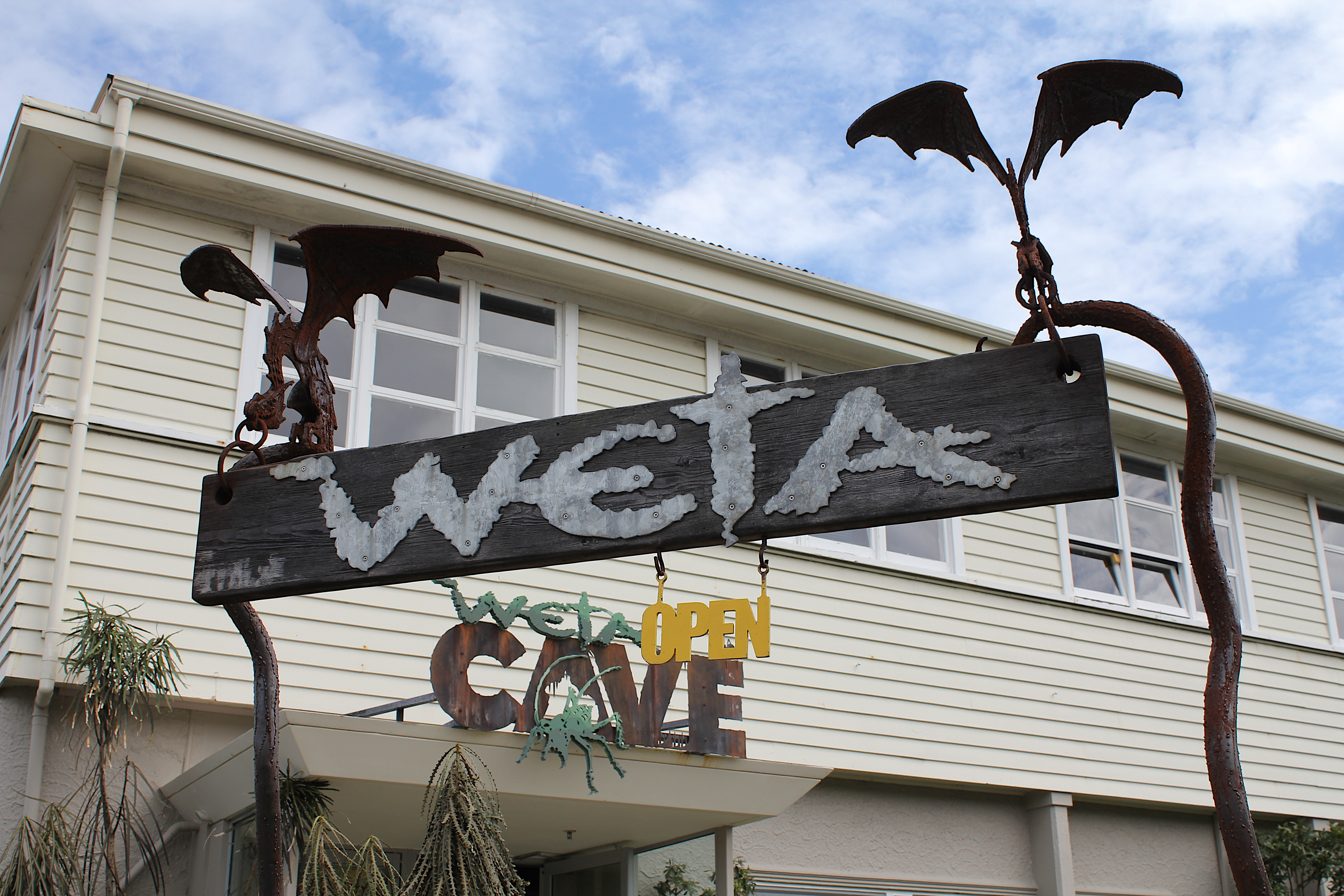
Sign outside the Wētā Cave in Wellington, a museum and gift shop owned by Wētā Workshop

=== Wētā Workshop Experiences, Wellington ===
The tour is located at the Wētā Workshop headquarters in Miramar, Wellington. Guided tours, which first opened to the public in 2012, provide a look into the workshop through the armoury. The experience displays authentic props, costumes, and weapons from various film franchises, including The Lord of the Rings, The Hobbit, and District 9 as well as Wētā Workshop's own IP. During the tour, guides describe the transition of a project from a concept sketch to a finished physical prop. Photography is restricted in specific areas of the tour space due to intellectual property requirements.

In 2025, Wētā Workshop Experiences was rated by Lonely Planet as one of the top ten visitor activities in Wellington.

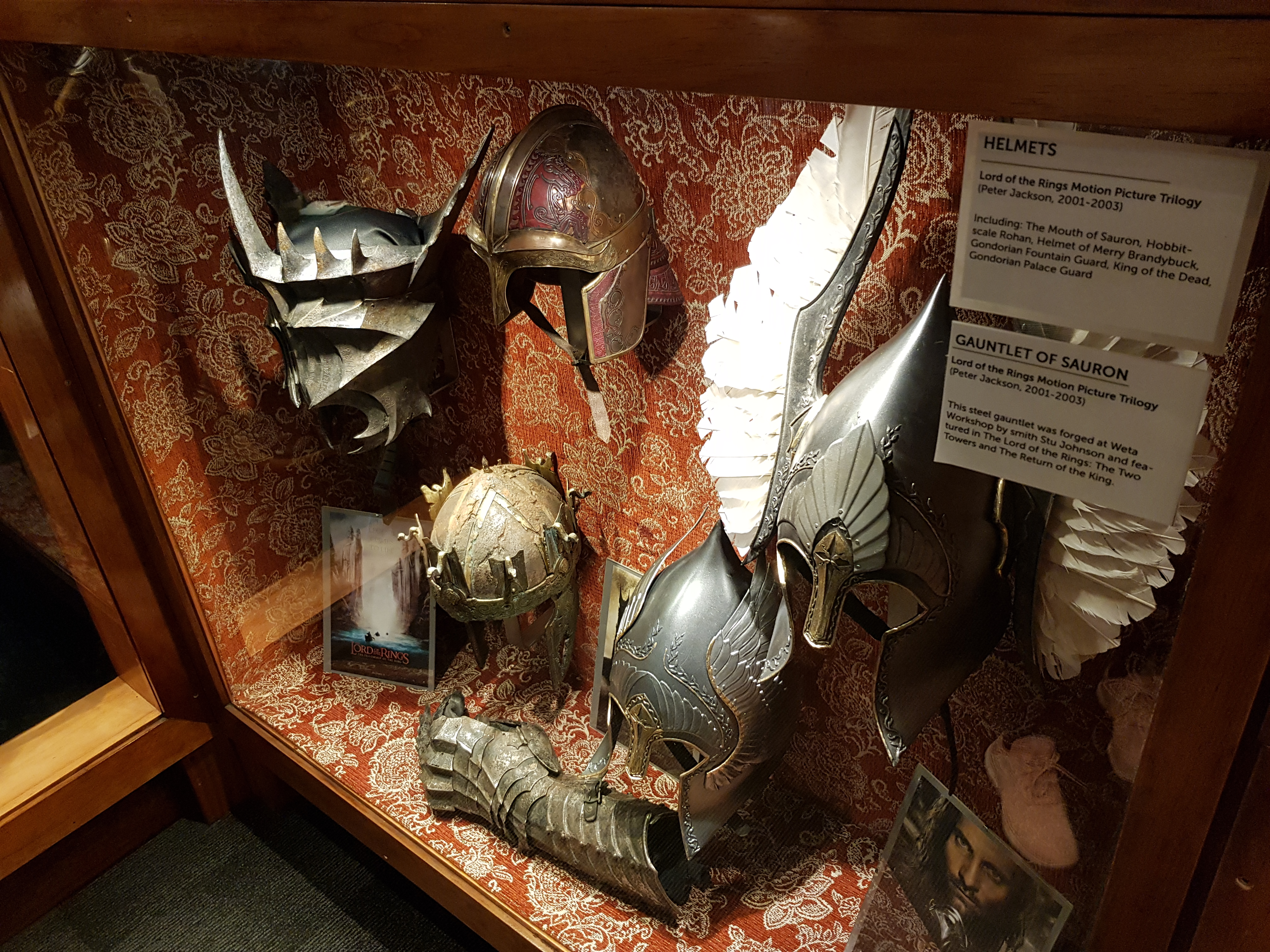
Costumes and armour designed by Wētā Workshop for The Lord of the Rings film trilogy at the Wētā Cave in Wellington

=== Wētā Workshop Unleashed, Auckland ===
Wētā Workshop Unleashed is a tourism attraction located at the SkyCity precinct in Auckland's central business district, which officially opened to the public on 15 December 2020. The experience is designed as a narrative-based journey exploring the creative process through three film genres: horror, fantasy, and science fiction. Visitors are introduced to the tour by an animatronic character named Jeff, before being guided through various sets styled to appear as active film productions. Unlike the Wellington experience, photography is permitted throughout this tour.

The tour includes several large-scale installations, such as a five-metre-tall robot and a fantasy castle environment. Hands-on exhibits and interactive elements allow guests to handle props and materials, operate puppets, use digital mirrors to view prosthetic effects, and enter a themed laboratory. The horror section includes a walk-through set, with an alternative route provided for those who wish to bypass that specific area. Although the featured projects are fictional, the tour demonstrates the practical effects techniques used by the company in major film productions.

The Auckland site also hosts scheduled workshops where participants can learn technical skills such as special effects makeup and miniature construction.

=== The Wētā Cave, Auckland ===
The Wētā Cave Auckland is the retail and reception hub for Wētā Workshop Unleashed. Similar to the Wellington branch, it functions as a themed environment that is free to enter without a tour ticket. The store is characterized by large-scale displays, including giant trolls and a sleeping dragon, which serve as focal points for photography.

The inventory includes a wide range of authentic collectibles, prop replicas, and movie memorabilia designed by the same artists who work on major film productions. The retail area specifically features a curated selection of high-end statues, art prints, apparel, and jewellery inspired by the workshop's cinematic projects.

== See also ==
- Legacy Effects
- Ray Harryhausen
- Stan Winston
- Jim Henson's Creature Shop
