= List of Middle-earth video games =

This is a list of Middle-earth video games. It includes both video games based directly on J. R. R. Tolkien's books about Middle-earth, and those derived from The Lord of the Rings and The Hobbit films by New Line Cinema and Warner Bros. which in turn were based on Tolkien's novels of the same name. Note that some titles advertised as ports for the most disparate platforms were in fact greatly or completely different games, organized as separate projects, or by independent studios.

== Official games based on the novels ==
=== 2D era (1982–1994) ===
Title	Year	Publisher(s)	Developer(s)	Platforms
The Hobbit (a.k.a. The Hobbit Software Adventure)	1982	Melbourne House (Europe); Tansoft (Oric); Addison-Wesley (North America, Australia); Beau Jolly (The Tolkien Trilogy)	Beam Software	Amstrad CPC, Apple II, BBC, Commodore 64, Dragon 32, IBM PC, Macintosh, MSX, Oric-1, Oric Atmos, ZX Spectrum
Lord of the Rings: Game One (a.k.a. The Fellowship of the Ring Software Adventure)	1985	Melbourne House (Europe); Addison-Wesley (North America, Australia); Guild Publishing (Re-release); Beau Jolly (The Tolkien Trilogy)	Beam Software	Amstrad CPC, Amstrad PCW, Apple II, BBC, Commodore 64, Dragon 32, IBM PC, Macintosh, ZX Spectrum
Shadows of Mordor: Game Two of Lord of the Rings (a.k.a. The Shadows of Mordor Software Adventure)	1987	Melbourne House (Europe); Addison-Wesley (North America, Australia); Beau Jolly (The Tolkien Trilogy)	Beam Software	Amstrad CPC, Apple II, Commodore 64, IBM PC, Macintosh, ZX Spectrum
War in Middle Earth (a.k.a. J.R.R. Tolkien's War in Middle Earth)	1988	Melbourne House	Synergistic Software	Amiga, Apple IIGS, Atari ST, IBM PC
War in Middle Earth (a.k.a. J.R.R. Tolkien's War in Middle Earth)	1988	Melbourne House	Maelstrom Games	Amstrad CPC, C64, ZX Spectrum
The Crack of Doom (a.k.a. The Crack of Doom Software Adventure)	1989	Addison-Wesley	Beam Software	Apple II, Commodore 64, Macintosh, IBM PC
J.R.R. Tolkien's The Lord of the Rings, Vol. I	1990	Interplay Productions	Interplay Productions	FM Towns, IBM PC, PC-98
J.R.R. Tolkien's The Lord of the Rings, Vol. I	1990	Interplay Productions	Silicon & Synapse	Amiga
J.R.R. Tolkien's The Lord of the Rings, Vol. I	1994	Interplay Productions	Interplay Productions	SNES
J. R. R. Tolkien's Riders of Rohan	1991	Konami; Mirrorsoft; Personal Software Services (Europe)	Beam Software; Papyrus Design Group	IBM PC
J.R.R. Tolkien's The Lord of the Rings, Vol. II: The Two Towers	1992	Interplay Productions	Interplay Productions	FM Towns, IBM PC, PC-98

=== 3D era (since 2002) ===
Title	Year	Publisher(s)	Developer(s)	Platforms	Metacritic score
The Lord of the Rings: The Fellowship of the Ring	2002	Black Label Games; Sierra (re-release)	Surreal Software	Windows	59
The Lord of the Rings: The Fellowship of the Ring	2002	Black Label Games; Sierra (re-release)	Surreal Software	PlayStation 2	59
The Lord of the Rings: The Fellowship of the Ring	2002	Black Label Games; Sierra (re-release)	The Whole Experience	Xbox	59
The Lord of the Rings: The Fellowship of the Ring	2002	Black Label Games; Sierra (re-release)	Pocket Studios	Game Boy Advance	51
The Lord of the Rings: War of the Ring	2003	Sierra	Liquid Entertainment	Windows	67
The Hobbit	2003	Sierra	Inevitable Entertainment	Xbox	N/A
The Hobbit	2003	Sierra	Inevitable Entertainment	PlayStation 2	59
The Hobbit	2003	Sierra	Inevitable Entertainment	GameCube	61
The Hobbit	2003	Sierra	Fizz Factor	Windows	62
The Hobbit	2003	Sierra	Saffire	Game Boy Advance	67
The Lord of the Rings Online; Expansion packs: Mines of Moria (2008); Siege of Mirkwood (2009); Rise of Isengard (2011); Riders of Rohan (2012); Helm's Deep (2013); Mordor (2017); Minas Morgul (2019); War of Three Peaks (2020); Fate of Gundabad (2021); Before the Shadow (2022); Corsairs of Umbar (2023); Legacy of Morgoth (2024); Kingdoms of Harad (2025); The Wolves of Mordor (2026)	2007–2026	Turbine Inc. Midway; Codemasters (Europe only, 2007-2011); Warner Bros. Interactive Entertainment (2011-2016); Daybreak Game Company	Turbine Inc. (2007–2016); Standing Stone Games (2016–present)	Windows	86
The Lord of the Rings Online; Expansion packs: Mines of Moria (2008); Siege of Mirkwood (2009); Rise of Isengard (2011); Riders of Rohan (2012); Helm's Deep (2013); Mordor (2017); Minas Morgul (2019); War of Three Peaks (2020); Fate of Gundabad (2021); Before the Shadow (2022); Corsairs of Umbar (2023); Legacy of Morgoth (2024); Kingdoms of Harad (2025); The Wolves of Mordor (2026)	2007–2026	Turbine Inc. Midway; Codemasters (Europe only, 2007-2011); Warner Bros. Interactive Entertainment (2011-2016); Daybreak Game Company	Turbine Inc. (2007–2016); Standing Stone Games (2016–present)	macOS	86
The Lord of the Rings: Adventure Card Game	2018	Twin Sails Interactive	Fantasy Flight Interactive; Antihero Studios	Windows	60
The Lord of the Rings: Adventure Card Game	2018	Twin Sails Interactive	Fantasy Flight Interactive; Antihero Studios	macOS	60
The Lord of the Rings: Adventure Card Game	2018	Twin Sails Interactive	Fantasy Flight Interactive; Antihero Studios	PlayStation 4	70
The Lord of the Rings: Adventure Card Game	2018	Twin Sails Interactive	Fantasy Flight Interactive; Antihero Studios	Xbox One	N/A
The Lord of the Rings: Adventure Card Game	2018	Twin Sails Interactive	Virtuos	Nintendo Switch	75
The Lord of the Rings: Journeys in Middle-earth	2019	Asmodee Digital	Fantasy Flight Interactive	Windows	70
The Lord of the Rings: Journeys in Middle-earth	2019	Asmodee Digital	Fantasy Flight Interactive	macOS	70
The Lord of the Rings: Gollum	2023	Daedalic Entertainment, Nacon	Daedalic Entertainment	Windows	38
The Lord of the Rings: Gollum	2023	Daedalic Entertainment, Nacon	Daedalic Entertainment	PlayStation 4	40
The Lord of the Rings: Gollum	2023	Daedalic Entertainment, Nacon	Daedalic Entertainment	PlayStation 5	34
The Lord of the Rings: Gollum	2023	Daedalic Entertainment, Nacon	Daedalic Entertainment	Xbox One	N/A
The Lord of the Rings: Gollum	2023	Daedalic Entertainment, Nacon	Daedalic Entertainment	Xbox Series X/S	43
The Lord of the Rings: Return to Moria	2023	North Beach Games	Free Range Games	Windows	59
The Lord of the Rings: Return to Moria	2023	North Beach Games	Free Range Games	PlayStation 5	51
The Lord of the Rings: Return to Moria	2023	North Beach Games	Free Range Games	Xbox Series X/S	83
Tales of the Shire: A The Lord of the Rings Game	2025	Private Division	Wētā Workshop	Xbox Series X	59
Tales of the Shire: A The Lord of the Rings Game	2025	Private Division	Wētā Workshop	PlayStation 5	61
Tales of the Shire: A The Lord of the Rings Game	2025	Private Division	Wētā Workshop	Windows	58
Tales of the Shire: A The Lord of the Rings Game	2025	Private Division	Wētā Workshop	Nintendo Switch	59

== Official games based on the films ==
Title	Year	Publisher(s)	Developer(s)	Platforms	Metacritic score
The Lord of the Rings: The Two Towers	2002	Electronic Arts	Stormfront Studios	Xbox	79
The Lord of the Rings: The Two Towers	2002	Electronic Arts	Stormfront Studios	PlayStation 2	82
The Lord of the Rings: The Two Towers	2002	Electronic Arts	Hypnos Entertainment	GameCube	82
The Lord of the Rings: The Two Towers	2002	Electronic Arts	Griptonite Games	Game Boy Advance	78
The Lord of the Rings: The Return of the King	2003	Electronic Arts	EA Redwood Shores	Windows	78
The Lord of the Rings: The Return of the King	2003	Electronic Arts	EA Redwood Shores	PlayStation 2	85
The Lord of the Rings: The Return of the King	2003	Electronic Arts	Hypnos Entertainment	Xbox	84
The Lord of the Rings: The Return of the King	2003	Electronic Arts	Hypnos Entertainment	GameCube	84
The Lord of the Rings: The Return of the King	2003	Electronic Arts	Griptonite Games	Game Boy Advance	77
The Lord of the Rings: The Return of the King	2003	Aspyr; Electronic Arts	Beenox	Mac OS X	78
The Lord of the Rings: The Third Age	2004	Electronic Arts	EA Redwood Shores	PlayStation 2	73
The Lord of the Rings: The Third Age	2004	Electronic Arts	EA Redwood Shores	Xbox	75
The Lord of the Rings: The Third Age	2004	Electronic Arts	Griptonite Games	Game Boy Advance	67
The Lord of the Rings: The Third Age	2004	Electronic Arts	Hypnos Entertainment	GameCube	74
The Lord of the Rings: The Battle for Middle-earth	2004	Electronic Arts	EA Los Angeles	Windows	82
The Lord of the Rings: Tactics	2005	Electronic Arts	Amaze	PlayStation Portable	64
The Lord of the Rings: The Battle for Middle-earth II Expansion pack: The Rise of the Witch-king	2006	Electronic Arts	EA Los Angeles	Windows	84
The Lord of the Rings: The Battle for Middle-earth II Expansion pack: The Rise of the Witch-king	2006	Electronic Arts	EA Los Angeles	Xbox 360	79
The Lord of the Rings: Conquest	2009	Electronic Arts	Pandemic Studios	Xbox 360	55
The Lord of the Rings: Conquest	2009	Electronic Arts	Pandemic Studios	PlayStation 3	54
The Lord of the Rings: Conquest	2009	Electronic Arts	Pandemic Studios	Windows	57
The Lord of the Rings: Conquest	2009	Electronic Arts	Artificial Mind and Movement	Nintendo DS	61
The Lord of the Rings: Aragorn's Quest	2010	Warner Bros. Interactive Entertainment	Headstrong Games	Wii	58
The Lord of the Rings: Aragorn's Quest	2010	Warner Bros. Interactive Entertainment	TT Fusion	PlayStation 2	50
The Lord of the Rings: Aragorn's Quest	2010	Warner Bros. Interactive Entertainment	TT Fusion	PlayStation Portable	50
The Lord of the Rings: Aragorn's Quest	2010	Warner Bros. Interactive Entertainment	TT Fusion	PlayStation 3	58
The Lord of the Rings: Aragorn's Quest	2010	Warner Bros. Interactive Entertainment	TT Fusion	Nintendo DS	60
The Lord of the Rings: War in the North	2011; 2026 (re-release)	Warner Bros. Interactive Entertainment	Snowblind Studios	Xbox 360	61
The Lord of the Rings: War in the North	2011; 2026 (re-release)	Warner Bros. Interactive Entertainment	Snowblind Studios	PlayStation 3	63
The Lord of the Rings: War in the North	2011; 2026 (re-release)	Warner Bros. Interactive Entertainment	Snowblind Studios	Windows	66
The Lord of the Rings: War in the North	2011; 2026 (re-release)	Warner Bros. Interactive Entertainment	Feral Interactive	Mac OS	66
The Lord of the Rings: War in the North	2011; 2026 (re-release)	Aspyr	Aspyr	Xbox Series	75
The Lord of the Rings: War in the North	2011; 2026 (re-release)	Aspyr	Aspyr	PlayStation 5	63
The Lord of the Rings: War in the North	2011; 2026 (re-release)	Aspyr	Pingle Studio	Nintendo Switch	60
The Lord of the Rings: War in the North	2011; 2026 (re-release)	Aspyr	Pingle Studio	Nintendo Switch 2	57
Guardians of Middle-earth	2012	Warner Bros. Interactive Entertainment	Monolith Productions	PlayStation 3	75
Guardians of Middle-earth	2012	Warner Bros. Interactive Entertainment	Monolith Productions	Xbox 360	71
Guardians of Middle-earth	2012	Warner Bros. Interactive Entertainment	Zombie Studios	Windows	56
Lego The Lord of the Rings	2012	Warner Bros. Interactive Entertainment	Traveller's Tales	Windows	80
Lego The Lord of the Rings	2012	Warner Bros. Interactive Entertainment	Traveller's Tales	Wii	80
Lego The Lord of the Rings	2012	Warner Bros. Interactive Entertainment	Traveller's Tales	PlayStation 3	82
Lego The Lord of the Rings	2012	Warner Bros. Interactive Entertainment	Traveller's Tales	Xbox 360	80
Lego The Lord of the Rings	2012	Warner Bros. Interactive Entertainment	Feral Interactive	Mac OS	80
Lego The Lord of the Rings	2012	Warner Bros. Interactive Entertainment	TT Fusion	Nintendo 3DS	61
Lego The Lord of the Rings	2012	Warner Bros. Interactive Entertainment	TT Fusion	Nintendo DS	60
Lego The Lord of the Rings	2012	Warner Bros. Interactive Entertainment	TT Fusion	PlayStation Vita	54
Lego The Hobbit	2014	Warner Bros. Interactive Entertainment	Traveller's Tales	Windows	68
Lego The Hobbit	2014	Warner Bros. Interactive Entertainment	Traveller's Tales	Wii U	70
Lego The Hobbit	2014	Warner Bros. Interactive Entertainment	Traveller's Tales	PlayStation 3	72
Lego The Hobbit	2014	Warner Bros. Interactive Entertainment	Traveller's Tales	Xbox 360	70
Lego The Hobbit	2014	Warner Bros. Interactive Entertainment	Traveller's Tales	PlayStation 4	72
Lego The Hobbit	2014	Warner Bros. Interactive Entertainment	Traveller's Tales	Xbox One	69
Lego The Hobbit	2014	Warner Bros. Interactive Entertainment	Feral Interactive	Mac OS	68
Lego The Hobbit	2014	Warner Bros. Interactive Entertainment	TT Fusion	Nintendo 3DS	70
Lego The Hobbit	2014	Warner Bros. Interactive Entertainment	TT Fusion	PlayStation Vita	60
Middle-earth: Shadow of Mordor	2014	Warner Bros. Interactive Entertainment	Monolith Productions	Xbox One	87
Middle-earth: Shadow of Mordor	2014	Warner Bros. Interactive Entertainment	Monolith Productions	PlayStation 4	84
Middle-earth: Shadow of Mordor	2014	Warner Bros. Interactive Entertainment	Monolith Productions	Windows	84
Middle-earth: Shadow of Mordor	2014	Warner Bros. Interactive Entertainment	Feral Interactive	macOS	84
Middle-earth: Shadow of Mordor	2014	Warner Bros. Interactive Entertainment	Feral Interactive	Linux	84
Middle-earth: Shadow of Mordor	2014	Warner Bros. Interactive Entertainment	Behaviour Interactive	Xbox 360	N/A
Middle-earth: Shadow of Mordor	2014	Warner Bros. Interactive Entertainment	Behaviour Interactive	PlayStation 3	N/A
Middle-earth: Shadow of War	2017	Warner Bros. Interactive Entertainment	Monolith Productions	Xbox One	81
Middle-earth: Shadow of War	2017	Warner Bros. Interactive Entertainment	Monolith Productions	PlayStation 4	80
Middle-earth: Shadow of War	2017	Warner Bros. Interactive Entertainment	Monolith Productions	Windows	75

== Mobile games ==
Title	Year	Publisher(s)	Developer(s)	Platforms	Metacritic score
The Lord of the Rings: The Forces of Light and Darkness	2001	Movistar; Eircell	Riot-E	Mobile	
The Lord of the Rings: The Journeys of the Fellowship	2001	Movistar; Eircell	Riot-E	Mobile	
The Lord of the Rings: The Battle of Middle-earth	2001	Movistar; Eircell	Riot-E	Mobile	
The Lord of the Rings: The Two Towers	2002	Jamdat Mobile	Flarb	Mobile	
The Lord of the Rings Trivia Game	2003	Jamdat Mobile	Centerscore	Mobile	
The Lord of the Rings: The Two Towers Trivia	2003	Jamdat Mobile	Jamdat Mobile	Mobile	
The Lord of the Rings: The Return of the King	2003	Jamdat Mobile	ImaginEngine	Mobile	
The Lord of the Rings Pinball	2003	Jamdat Mobile	Jamdat Mobile	Mobile	
The Lord of the Rings: The Return of the King Trivia	2004	Jamdat Mobile	Jamdat Mobile	Mobile	
The Lord of the Rings: Trilogy	2005	Jamdat Mobile	Jamdat Mobile	Mobile	
The Lord of the Rings: Legends	2005	Jamdat Mobile	Microjocs Mobile	Mobile	
The Lord of the Rings: Middle-earth Defense	2010	Glu Mobile	Glu Mobile	iOS	65
Lego The Lord of the Rings	2012	Warner Bros. Interactive Entertainment	TT Fusion	Android, iOS	78
The Hobbit: Kingdoms of Middle-earth	2012	Warner Bros. Interactive Entertainment; Kabam	Kabam	Android, iOS	56
The Lord of the Rings: Legends of Middle-earth	2014	Warner Bros. Interactive Entertainment; Kabam	Kabam; Tokkun Studio	Android, iOS	52
The Hobbit: Battle of the Five Armies - Fight for Middle-earth	2014	Warner Bros. Interactive Entertainment	Juego Studio	Android, iOS	20
Middle-earth: Shadow of War - The Mobile Game	2017	Warner Bros. Interactive Entertainment	IUGO Mobile	Android, iOS	67
The Lord of the Rings: Journeys in Middle-earth	2019	Asmodee Digital	Fantasy Flight Interactive	Android, iOS	
The Lord of the Rings: Rise to War	2021	Warner Bros. Interactive Entertainment	NetEase	Android, iOS	76
The Lord of the Rings: Heroes of Middle-earth	2023	Electronic Arts	EA Capital Games; EA Mobile	Android, iOS	40

== Browser games ==
Title	Year	Publisher(s)	Developer(s)	Platforms
The Lord of the Rings Online TCG	2003	Decipher, Inc. Sony Online Entertainment	Worlds Apart	Web browser
The Hobbit: Dwarf Combat Training	2012	Warner Bros. Interactive Entertainment	Sticky Studios	Web browser
The Hobbit: Armies of The Third Age	2013	Warner Bros. Interactive Entertainment; Kabam	Kabam	Facebook
The Hobbit: A Journey through Middle-earth	2013	Warner Bros. Interactive Entertainment	North Kingdom	Google Chrome
The Hobbit: The Desolation of Smaug – Barrel Escape	2013	Warner Bros. Interactive Entertainment	Sticky Studios	Web browser
The Hobbit: The Desolation of Smaug – Spiders of Mirkwood	2013	Warner Bros. Interactive Entertainment	Trigger	Web browser
The Hobbit: Battle of the Five Armies - Orc Attack	2014	Warner Bros. Interactive Entertainment	SMG Studio	Web browser

== Cancelled games, expansions and ports ==
Title	Planned Year	Publisher(s)	Developer(s)	Platforms
The Lord of the Rings: Journey to Rivendell	1983	Parker Brothers	Parker Brothers	Atari 2600; Atari 8-bit
War in Middle Earth	1990	Melbourne House	Arcadia Systems	NES
J.R.R. Tolkien's The Lord of the Rings, Vol. I	1991	Interplay Productions	Interplay Productions	NES; Commodore 64
The Lord of the Rings	1992	Electronic Arts	Electronic Arts	Genesis
J.R.R. Tolkien's The Lord of the Rings, Vol. II: The Two Towers	1992	Interplay Productions	Silicon & Synapse	Amiga
J.R.R. Tolkien's The Lord of the Rings, Vol. III: The Return of the King	1993	Interplay Productions	Interplay Productions	MS-DOS
J.R.R. Tolkien's The Lord of the Rings, Volume 1	1994	Interplay Productions	Interplay Productions	NES; Game Boy
Middle-earth Online	2000	Sierra On-Line	Yosemite Entertainment	Windows macOS
The Lord of the Rings: The Fellowship of the Ring	2001	Electronic Arts	Stormfront Studios; EA Redwood Shores	PlayStation 2
The Lord of the Rings: Mines of Moria	2002	Movistar; Eircell	Riot-E	Mobile phone
The Lord of the Rings: The Two Towers	2002	Electronic Arts	Ritual Entertainment	Windows
Untitled Lord of the Rings game	2002	Sierra Entertainment	Troika Games; Sierra Entertainment	Windows
The Lord of the Rings: The Treason of Isengard	2003	Black Label Games	Surreal Software	PlayStation 2 Xbox
The Lord of the Rings: The Return of the King	2004	Black Label Games	Surreal Software	PlayStation 2 Xbox; Windows
The Lord of the Rings: The White Council	2007	Electronic Arts	EA Redwood Shores	PlayStation 3 Xbox 360; Windows
The Lord of the Rings Online	2009	Turbine Inc.	Turbine Inc.	PlayStation 3 Xbox 360
The Hobbit	2012	Warner Bros. Interactive Entertainment	Traveller's Tales	Xbox 360
Lego The Hobbit: The Battle of the Five Armies	2014	Warner Bros. Interactive Entertainment	Traveller's Tales	PlayStation 4 Xbox One; Windows; PlayStation 3 Xbox 360; Wii U
The Lord of the Rings: Adventure Card Game	2019	Asmodee Digital	Fantasy Flight Interactive	Android; Apple iOS
The Lord of the Rings untitled MMORPG	2021	Athlon Games; Amazon Games	Leyou; Amazon Games	Xbox Series; PlayStation 5 Windows
The Lord of the Rings untitled MMORPG	2023	Embracer Group; Amazon Games	Amazon Games	Xbox Series; PlayStation 5 Windows
The Lord of the Rings: Gollum	2023	Daedalic Entertainment	Daedalic Entertainment	Nintendo Switch
The Lord of the Rings: It's Magic!	2024	Daedalic Entertainment	Daedalic Entertainment	Microsoft Windows
Tales of the Shire: A The Lord of the Rings Game	2025	Weta Workshop	Netflix Games	Android iOS

== Parodies ==
- Bored of the Rings (1985), partially inspired by the book of the same name (1969).
- The Boggit: Bored Too (1986)
