= The Lord of the Rings (disambiguation) =

The Lord of the Rings is a fantasy novel by J. R. R. Tolkien.

The Lord of the Rings may also refer to:

== Arts and entertainment ==
=== Characters ===
- Sauron, eponymous antagonist of The Lord of the Rings

=== Films ===
- The Lord of the Rings (1978 film), an animated film by Ralph Bakshi
- The Lord of the Rings (film series), a trilogy of films by Peter Jackson (2001–2003)
  - The Lord of the Rings: The Fellowship of the Ring (2001)
  - The Lord of the Rings: The Two Towers (2002)
  - The Lord of the Rings: The Return of the King (2003)
- The Lord of the Rings: The War of the Rohirrim (2024)
- The Lord of the Rings: The Hunt for Gollum (2027)
- The Lord of the Rings: Shadows of the Past (TBC)

=== Games and toys ===
- Lord of the Rings: Game One, a 1985 computer game for multiple platforms
- Lord of the Rings (board game), by Reiner Knizia
- Lord of the Rings (Heritage Models), a set of miniatures
- The Lord of the Rings: The Battle for Middle-earth, an RTS game by Electronic Arts
  - The Lord of the Rings: The Battle for Middle-earth II, its sequel
- The Lord of the Rings: Conquest, an action video game by Pandemic Studios
- The Lord of the Rings: The Card Game, a card game by Fantasy Flight Games
- The Lord of the Rings Online, an MMORPG video game by Turbine
- The Lord of the Rings Roleplaying Game, a CODA role-playing game by Decipher
- The Lord of the Rings Strategy Battle Game, a tabletop miniature wargame by Games Workshop
- The Lord of the Rings Trading Card Game, a collectible card game by Decipher
- The Lord of the Rings: War in the North, a role-playing video game by Snowblind Studios
- The Lord of the Rings: Gollum, an action-adventure game by Daedalic Entertainment
- J.R.R. Tolkien's The Lord of the Rings, Vol. I (1990 video game), by Interplay
- J.R.R. Tolkien's The Lord of the Rings, Vol. II: The Two Towers, a 1992 video game by Interplay
- J.R.R. Tolkien's The Lord of the Rings, Vol. I (1994 video game), a Super Nintendo video game by Interplay

=== Music ===
- Music Inspired by Lord of the Rings (Bo Hansson album), a 1970 album by Swedish rock musician Bo Hansson
- The Lord of the Rings (soundtrack), the soundtrack for the 1978 Ralph Bakshi film
- Symphony No. 1 "The Lord of the Rings" (1988), a five-piece set for concert band by Johan de Meij
- "Lord of the Rings", a song by Blind Guardian from Tales from the Twilight World (1990)
- Music of The Lord of the Rings film series, the soundtrack for the 2001-2003 Peter Jackson films

=== Radio series ===
- The Lord of the Rings (1955 radio series), a BBC radio series
- The Lord of the Rings (1979 radio series), an American NPR series
- The Lord of the Rings (1981 radio series), a BBC radio series

=== Television and theater ===
- The Lord of the Rings: The Rings of Power, a television series produced by Amazon Studios
- The Lord of the Rings (musical), a live theatrical production

== People ==
- Yuri van Gelder, Dutch gymnast nicknamed "Lord of the Rings"

== See also ==
- Der Herr der Ringe, a 1992 German radio series on SDR and WDR
