= Middle-earth Enterprises =

Intellectual property company and subdivision of the Embracer Group

- Formerly: Tolkien Enterprises (1977–2010)
- Type: Division
- Founded: 1977; 49 years ago
- Headquarters: Berkeley, California
- Key people: Lee Guinchard (CEO)
- Brands: The Lord of the Rings; The Hobbit
- Parent: The Saul Zaentz Company (1977–2022); Embracer Group (2022–present)
- Website: middleearth.com

Middle-earth Enterprises, formerly known as Tolkien Enterprises, is a subdivision of the Embracer Freemode division of Embracer Group and formerly a trade name for a division of The Saul Zaentz Company. The subdivision owns the worldwide exclusive rights to certain elements of J. R. R. Tolkien's two most famous literary works, The Hobbit and The Lord of the Rings. These elements include the names of characters contained within as well as the names of places, objects and events within them, and certain short phrases and sayings from the works.

In 2022, Embracer Group purchased Middle-earth Enterprises from The Saul Zaentz Company.

== Background and history ==
J. R. R. Tolkien, the author of The Hobbit and The Lord of the Rings, sold the film, stage and merchandising rights of those works to United Artists in 1969. They in turn sold them to The Saul Zaentz Company in 1976, which in turn formed Tolkien Enterprises, now named Middle-earth Enterprises, in 1977. United Artists retained distribution rights.

In 1977, Rankin/Bass licensed the rights to produce an animated version of The Hobbit, which was broadcast on NBC. In 1978, Tolkien Enterprises and the distributor United Artists funded and released an animated version of The Lord of the Rings directed by Ralph Bakshi, which covered approximately the first half of The Lord of the Rings.

In 1999, the company severed their licensing agreement with Iron Crown Enterprises (ICE) for role-playing games set in Middle-earth after ICE ceased developing new products for this line. This contributed to ICE filing for bankruptcy in 2001. Tolkien Enterprises then made a new licensing agreement with Decipher, Inc. for their The Lord of the Rings Roleplaying Game, which published content from 2002 to 2006.

Initially, Miramax was backing the production of Peter Jackson's The Lord of the Rings films in 1997, but was restricted by then-owner Disney, who demanded that they turn the story into one film instead of two films, thus Jackson brought the project to New Line Cinema, who acquired the rights to develop The Lord of the Rings and The Hobbit from Miramax for about $12 million (Miramax retained a 5% stake in the gross). Principal photography for Jackson's The Lord of the Rings film trilogy was conducted concurrently in New Zealand from 11 October 1999 through to 22 December 2000. Produced under license from Tolkien Enterprises and released by New Line in 2001, 2002, and 2003, the films met critical and commercial success, but in August 2004, Tolkien Enterprises sued New Line for $20 million in unpaid royalties based on the difference between gross and net profits. An out-of-court settlement was reached in August 2005, though details were not released.

Video game rights to Tolkien's literary works were first licensed to Vivendi, which produced The Fellowship of the Ring in 2002 and The Hobbit in 2003. At around the same time licensing agreements for products relating to the films produced by Peter Jackson were obtained by Electronic Arts (EA), leading to the release of a series of games, starting with The Two Towers in 2002. In 2005, EA acquired the rights to produce games based on the literary works as well, producing further titles up to the release of The Lord of the Rings: Conquest in 2009, when the licensing agreement expired. Video game rights then passed to Warner Brothers.

In 2010, the name was changed to Middle-earth Enterprises.

In 2011, Cubicle 7 produced The One Ring Roleplaying Game, a licensed role-playing game set in Middle-earth, in collaboration with Sophisticated Games. While the game featured its own unique rules, Cubicle 7 revealed in 2016 that it would create an adaptation using tabletop gaming rules compatible with Dungeons & Dragons. In 2020, Cubicle 7 lost the rights, which were then relicensed to Free League Publishing, which published the second edition of The One Ring in 2021 and later a D&D-compatible version in late 2022.

In 2022, Middle-earth Enterprises was purchased by Embracer Group, the parent company of THQ Nordic.

=== Legal disputes ===
In March 2012, The Hobbit, a pub in Southampton, England, received documents from Middle-earth Enterprises alleging copyright infringement of its name. The Hobbit pub continues to trade under that name as of October 2020. The Hungry Hobbit café in Birmingham, near where J. R. R. Tolkien grew up, was also threatened with legal action in 2011. These actions incurred backlash from many British public figures such as Stephen Fry, who described at as "senseless" bullying.

In November 2012, the Tolkien Estate, trustee and publishers sued Middle-earth Enterprises, Warner Bros., and New Line Cinema for infringing Tolkien's copyrights by producing casino and video games using his characters. The original license to Tolkien's works was limited to the right to sell "tangible" products such as "figurines, tableware, stationery items, clothing, and the like", but did not cover "electronic or digital rights, rights in media yet to be devised or other intangibles such as rights in services". Tolkien's estate claimed that the defendants' actions had caused "irreparable harm to Tolkien's legacy". The lawsuit spent five years in discovery and was settled "amicably" out of court in July 2017, before a trial was held.

In March 2025, Middle-earth Enterprises failed in its attempt to oppose a request by vegan fast food chain Lord of the Fries to protect the three key words "Lord of the", which the company had used in its name for over 15 years.

== Licenses ==
As of 2023, the company's current licensees are as follows:

- Adaptations:
  - New Line Cinema/Warner Bros. – film rights.
  - Kevin Wallace Ltd for stage productions of The Lord of the Rings.
  - Video games:
    - 2000-2004: Sierra Entertainment - for an adaption of both of the books The Hobbit and The Lord of the Rings.
    - 2004-2009: Electronic Arts – for games based on both books in addition to the official The Lord of the Rings film trilogy license from New Line Cinema.
    - Post 2009: Warner Bros. Games – for games based on both books in addition to the official Peter Jackson's film series.
    - Daybreak Game Company – for an online role-playing game, The Lord of the Rings Online, originally developed by Turbine for Warner Bros. Interactive Entertainment.
    - 2019: Daedalic Entertainment/Nacon – for the video game The Lord of the Rings: Gollum (2023).
    - 2022: North Beach Games – for the video game The Lord of the Rings: Return to Moria (2023).
    - 2022: Electronic Arts – for the mobile game The Lord of the Rings: Heroes of Middle-earth.
  - Other games:
    - Games Workshop PLC for a range of miniatures games (Middle-earth Strategy Battle Game) and Battle Games in Middle-earth magazine.
    - Game Systems International Ltd. (Games Systems Inc.) for Middle-Earth Play-By-Mail released by Game Systems Inc. and the One Ring module of Legends (PBM) released by Harlequin Games.
    - Card games:
      - Wizards of the Coast's Magic: The Gathering's The Lord of the Rings: Tales of Middle-earth (2023-)
      - Fantasy Flight Games' The Lord of the Rings: The Card Game (2011-2022)
      - Decipher's The Lord of the Rings Trading Card Game (2001-2007)
      - Iron Crown Enterprises' Middle-earth Collectible Card Game (1982-2000)
    - Roleplaying games:
      - Free League Publishing The One Ring and The Lord of the Rings Roleplaying (since 2020)
      - Cubicle 7's The One Ring Roleplaying Game and Adventures in Middle-earth (2011-2020)
      - Decipher's The Lord of the Rings Roleplaying Game (2001-2006)
      - Iron Crown Enterprises' Middle-earth Role Playing (1982-2000)
    - Mithril Miniatures for ranges of 32 mm and 54 mm scale metal miniatures.
    - US Games Systems Inc. – a Lord of the Rings based tarot card deck and game.
- Collectibles:
  - Danbury Mint for a variety of related merchandise such as film cells, watches and goblets.
  - Lladró Comercial, S.A.
  - Royal Selangor International for a range of pewter goblets, tankards and chess pieces.

== See also ==
- Tolkien Estate, hereditary owners of the copyrights to Tolkien's works
- Category:Works based on Middle-earth, containing adaptions of Tolkien's works on Middle-earth
- Middle-earth in video games, a history of video and computer game adaptions, both licensed and unlicensed
