= J.R.R. Tolkien's The Lord of the Rings, Vol. I =

J.R.R. Tolkien's The Lord of the Rings, Vol. I refer to two video games:

- J.R.R. Tolkien's The Lord of the Rings, Vol. I (1990 video game)
- J.R.R. Tolkien's The Lord of the Rings, Vol. I (1994 video game)
