= Middle-earth: The Wizards Companion =

1996 supplement to the Middle-Earth Collectable Card Game

Cover art, 1996

Middle-earth: The Wizards Companion is a book published by Iron Crown Enterprises (ICE) in 1996 about their Middle-earth Collectible Card Game.

== Description ==
Middle-earth: The Wizards Companion is a 104-page softcover book written by Coleman Charlton, Michael Reynolds, John Curtis, Pete Fenlon, Jason O. Hawkins, Nick Morawitz, Jessica Ney-Grimm, and Dave Platnick. The book acts as a guide to the Middle-earth Collectible Card Game, which had been published by ICE the previous year. It features an introduction discussing the background and inspiration for the game, followed by a revised and annotated set of rules for the game. It also details turn summaries, strategy tips and various ways the game can be played solo.

== Reception ==
In the June 1996 edition of Arcane (Issue 7), Andy Butcher was ambivalent about Middle-earth: The Wizards Companion, commenting, "What is here is good stuff - but it could have been a lot better." Butcher gave this book an average rating of 7 out of 10 overall.

In the August 1996 edition of Dragon (Issue 232), Rick Swan called the book a "lavish guide" to the game, and noted that it had everything except color illustrations of the game cards. He concluded with a strong recommendation for players of the Middle-earth Collectible Card Game, saying, "The site analysis alone, however, makes it an essential purchase for those more interested in mastering the rules than drooling over artwork."

== Reviews ==
- Backstab #3
