= Middle-earth: Dark Minions Player Guide =

Collectible card game supplement

Middle-earth: Dark Minions Player Guide is a tabletop card game supplement published by Iron Crown Enterprises for Middle-earth Collectible Card Game.

== Contents ==
Middle-earth: Dark Minions Player Guide is a supplement in which the Dark Minions expansion is supported. Structured in three parts, the guide opens with a Strategy Guide that outlines new deck-building approaches and gameplay tactics introduced by the expansion, offering errata updates and example decks tailored to these mechanics. The second section provides a complete card list, organized by card type and packed with all relevant in-game data for reference. The final and largest section delves into individual card commentary, pairing card images with concise discussions on their utility, strategic nuance, and tips for optimal play. The book includes extensive "flavor text" drawn from Tolkien lore.

== Reception ==
Andy Butcher reviewed Middle-earth: Dark Minions Player Guide for Arcane magazine, rating it a 7 out of 10 overall, and stated that "Once again, then, this is a solid and useful player's guide from ICE, although not particularly outstanding in any area."
