= The Lord of the Rings Online: Before the Shadow =

- Developer: Standing Stone Games
- Publisher: Daybreak Game Company
- Engine: Turbine G3
- Platform: Microsoft Windows
- Release: November 15, 2022
- Genre: MMORPG
- Mode: Multiplayer

The Lord of the Rings Online: Before the Shadow is the tenth expansion for the MMORPG The Lord of the Rings Online, released on November 15, 2022. It did not raise the game's level cap or advance the current storyline, but instead added a new starting zone for the new player experience, with a storyline set prior to that of the Shadows of Angmar.

== Gameplay enhancements ==
Before the Shadow added two new game regions: Swanfleet and Cardolan, described by the game developers as one of the largest landmass additions across the entire history of the game. Both are located in Eriador and are adjacent to the original game regions such as Bree-land, Lone-lands and Trollshaws. The two regions contain quests in the level range of 1-30, thus providing new characters with an alternate leveling path to that from Shadows of Angmar. Newly created characters of all races can select to bypass their race-determined starter area in favour of Before the Shadow, the storyline of which is chronologically a prequel to the Shadows of Angmar. Existing characters can also travel there and experience all quests except the starting instance.

For high-level characters, the expansion introduced a "Delving" mechanic to the Mission System, enabling players to increase the difficulty of the Missions by up to ten tiers in exchange for progressive rewards. It also added a new 6-man instance and a new skirmish for the skirmish system.

== Soundtrack ==
Music for the Before the Shadow expansion was composed by Standing Stone Games' in-house composer Bill Champagne who has been responsible for all new LotRO music since 2018. The complete score of almost four hours in length was released as a playlist on the game's official YouTube channel.

== Critical reception ==
The expansion was positively received despite it limited benefits for the level-capped characters. Justin Olivetti of Massively Overpowered described it as having "so much stuff to explore that you hardly know where to start". Joseph Bradford of mmorpg.com described the new areas as "beautiful" and "absolutely breathtaking", while expressing that the new starter experience provided a much-needed contrast to the comparable regions from 15 years ago.
