= Murder of Jacqueline Thomas =

English 1961 murder

Jacqueline Thomas
- Born: Jacqueline Mary Thomas; 1945; Birmingham, West Midlands, England
- Died: 18 August 1961 (aged 15); Alum Rock, Birmingham, West Midlands, England
- Occupation: Biscuit factory worker

Jacqueline Mary Thomas (1945 – 18 August 1961) was an 15-year-old English biscuit-factory worker from Alum Rock, Birmingham, who was sexually assaulted and strangled after disappearing on 18 August 1961. Her body was discovered a week later close to her home, and the murder sparked a manhunt involving several hundred police officers. A suspect was identified at the time, but there was insufficient evidence to charge him, and the crime remained unsolved for over four decades until a cold case review in the 2000s. In 2007, 70-year-old Anthony Hall – already serving a life sentence for the murder of another teenager – was charged with Thomas's murder. However, a judge subsequently ruled the charge should be stayed owing to the length of time that had passed since the incident. Hall subsequently died in prison.

== Background ==
Jacqueline Thomas lived with her family in the Alum Rock area of the city, where she was one of eight sisters. On Friday, 18 August 1961 she attended a funfair at nearby Ward End with friends, and failed to return home afterwards. She was last seen alive at around 10:30 pm talking to a young man. Her family reported her missing when she did not return home. A week later on 25 August 1961, a dog walker found her body hidden in undergrowth at disused allotments close to her house in Everton Road. She had been sexually assaulted and strangled.

The ensuing murder investigation involved several hundred police officers who visited more than 1,000 homes in the area, and conducted interviews with local residents, as well as Thomas's colleagues and workers from the fair where she had last been seen. Police launched a poster appeal, while a request for information was made at the city's St Andrew's Stadium during a football match between Birmingham City and Leicester City.

Witnesses recalled Thomas speaking with a young man at the fair; he was subsequently identified as 24-year-old Anthony Hall, a married father of one. He admitted being at the fairground with Jacqueline Thomas on the evening of her death, and that they had embraced and kissed, but he denied killing her. He asked his mother to provide a false alibi, because he did not want his wife to know he had been "larking about" with girls. Although he was considered as a suspect, Hall was not charged with the murder. When the Coroner summed up at the inquest on Thursday 7 December 1961 he said that the jury had the choice of bringing in a verdict of murder by whoever they were satisfied did the murder, if they knew the name, or could bring in a verdict of murder by a person or persons unknown. He then said, 'After all, to accuse anyone of murder, to accuse Hall of murder in this case, is a very grave matter. It would mean if you brought in a verdict of murder against him, that I would have to commit him for trial for the most terrible of all crimes. I know you would not bring in such a verdict unless you were completely satisfied in your own minds'.

== Sylvia Whitehouse case ==
In March 1969 Hall was convicted of the murder of 16-year-old Sylvia Whitehouse, whom he stabbed to death with a screwdriver after offering her a lift in his car. Her body was discovered by a lorry driver in December 1968 on waste ground at Bickenhill Lane, Marston Green, near Birmingham Airport. The location was a popular destination for courting couples, and the case subsequently became known as the "Lovers' Lane Murder". Following his trial, Hall was jailed for life, and remained in custody until his death in 2011.

== Cold case review ==
As part of their effort to routinely re-examine evidence from unsolved cases, West Midlands Police's Major Crime Review Team revisited the investigation in early 2007. Advances in DNA technology made it possible to identify fresh evidence. Documents from the Jacqueline Thomas investigation were studied by detectives, and the case file was closely examined by lawyers from the Crown Prosecution Service. In November 2007 a decision was made to charge Hall with Jacqueline Thomas's murder, and he appeared at Birmingham Magistrates' Court on 29 November 2007. He again denied having anything to do with her death, and was remanded in custody.

At a hearing at Birmingham Crown Court on 19 August 2008, Judge Frank Chapman ruled that Hall should not stand trial for the murder because the events had occurred "too long ago", and any case against Hall would not be fair and balanced. Chapman told the court that since the 1961 investigation, 21 witnesses had died, while others could either not be traced or were too ill to attend a trial. Moreover, police had not kept evidence and records from the investigation, and because of the passage of time, Chapman believed it was unlikely that those witnesses who could give evidence would recall events with sufficient clarity for it to be reliable. Consequently, he stayed proceedings against Hall.

Outlining the essential case against the suspect, he said that it rested on two significant points – Jacqueline Thomas's time of death and the last person seen with her beforehand: "If they (the prosecution) had turned up something new it would have made all the difference, or may have done." Following the hearing, a member of the Major Crime Review Team commented: "Clearly we are not looking for anybody else but we respect the decision of the court."

On 6 December 2011, Anthony Hall died at a hospice following a long term illness. He remained in custody at the time of his death.

== See also ==
- List of solved missing person cases: 1950–1999
- Murder of Colette Aram
- Murder of Hannah Foster
- Murder of Lesley Molseed
