= Murder of Hannah Foster =

2003 murder of English schoolgirl

- Location: 50.9168°N 1.3853°W; Southampton and West End, Hampshire, England
- Date: 14–16 March 2003
- Attack type: Abduction, rape, and murder
- Deaths: 1
- Victim: Hannah Foster
- Perpetrator: Maninder Pal Singh Kohli
- Verdict: Guilty
- Convictions: Life imprisonment with a 24-year non-parole period
- Convicted: Maninder Pal Singh Kohli

Hannah Foster was a 17-year-old British student who was abducted after a night out in Southampton in mid-March 2003. Murdered by Indian immigrant Maninder Pal Singh Kohli, who had come to the UK in 1993, her body was found in nearby West End, Hampshire, two days after she disappeared. A few days later, Kohli fled to his family's home in Chandigarh, India, later assuming a new identity in Darjeeling, but was extradited in 2007. He is the first Indian citizen to be extradited to the UK. He was found guilty of the crime in 2008, and was sentenced to life imprisonment with a 24-year non-parole period.

== Background ==
Hannah Claire Foster (31 August 1985 – 14 March 2003) was an A-Level student who had been preparing to study medicine at university. She lived with her parents, Hilary and Trevor, and younger sister, Sarah, in Southampton. On 14 March 2003, she went out socialising with a friend in Southampton visiting both The Hobbit and nearby Sobar. At around 10:50 p.m., her friend caught a bus home on Portswood Road, while Foster decided to walk the half-mile (800 metres) to her home alone. A sandwich delivery man, Maninder Pal Singh Kohli, had also been drinking in the area. While driving home in a company van, he noticed Foster alone on the darkened streets, and abducted her as she passed his parked vehicle.

== Investigation ==
Foster's parents noticed that she had not come home at around 5 o'clock the next morning, and by 10:30 a.m. the local police were informed of her disappearance. Initial investigation focused on her prepaid mobile phone, which was still active, and police were able to trace its movements south using signal tower records. In Portsmouth, at a recycling centre, her phone and bag were found dumped in a bottle recycle bin. On 16 March, Foster's body was found dumped in bushes on Allington Lane, West End, just outside Southampton. A post-mortem examination revealed she had been beaten, raped, and strangled but the semen found on her clothing could not be matched to anyone on the database.

Investigators also traced her phone calls. Unknown to Kohli, while being driven south along the M27, Foster secretly made a 999 call to emergency services around 11:00 p.m. in the hope they would realise she was in trouble. However, as there was no direct communication with the operator, and as the voices were indistinct, the call was treated as a probable misdial and forwarded to Silent Solutions, a 2-minute-long recorded message telling people in need of assistance to dial 55. Investigators then enhanced the recording, and were able to learn that Foster was in the back of a van being driven by a man with a south Asian accent. After identifying seven vans on CCTV footage that might fit the route taken, a public appeal for information was made by the parents on 26 March via Crimewatch.

A supervisor at Hazlewood Foods identified Kohli, one of the company's drivers as a possible suspect. He had taken a van home that night, as he did not own his own vehicle, had a similar delivery route, had a fresh scratch on his face, and was unable to complete his shift the next day. Investigators, noting the same van on their shortlist, soon found blood and semen in the vehicle, and retraced its route in and around Southampton, the M27, Portsmouth, and the recycling centre. Now identified by investigators as the prime suspect, it was soon realised that Kohli had already travelled from Heathrow to Delhi on 18 March ostensibly to visit his comatose mother. Finding his house vacated, they also interviewed his wife and took a DNA sample from one of his two sons. Kohli's wife, a UK citizen, and his brother, a policeman in India, however, denied his involvement in the murder.

== Extradition ==
The case stalled for the next 15 months after Indian police were not able to prioritise the crime and media attention was low. On 10 July 2004, however, Foster's parents went to Chandigarh themselves and made a public appeal for information of his whereabouts. During their 10-day visit, the Fosters held a series of press conferences as well as opening a telephone "hotline". Their visit soon became a subject of high nationwide interest in the Indian press. Hampshire police, in conjunction with The Sun, announced a reward of ₹5 million to anyone whose information led to the arrest of Kohli.

On 15 July, after a number of tip-offs, Kohli was arrested by an off-duty policeman in West Bengal's Darjeeling district (where he had been working under an alias for the Red Cross) while trying to board a bus from Kalimpong to Nepal with his new wife. While in police custody, Kohli stated he was "tired of running". On 28 July, Kohli admitted to raping and murdering Foster in an interview with a private television channel, and said that he was forced to kill Foster after raping her because she refused to not report his crime. In August 2004, he retracted his statement saying it was "not by my own will". Kohli was then held in judicial custody in New Delhi pending extradition to the United Kingdom, and the case underwent 100 court proceedings and 35 appeals. After three years of wrangling, a final decision to extradite him to the UK was handed down on 8 June 2007.

== Trial ==
On 28 July, Kohli arrived at Heathrow and was arrested and charged with the kidnap, rape, and murder of Foster. He was also charged with manslaughter, false imprisonment, and perverting the course of justice. On 10 December 2007, Kohli entered a plea of not guilty to the charges at Winchester Crown Court. Kohli initially argued he simply found someone had broken into his van and dumped Foster's body there, causing him to panic. He later argued, after DNA evidence was produced, that criminals had forced him to rape and murder Foster.

On 25 November 2008, Kohli, then aged 41, was found guilty of all charges and sentenced to life imprisonment, with a recommended minimum term of 24 years, less two years for time already served in the UK on remand.

Foster's family expressed their disappointment in the sentence, having hoped the killer would spend the rest of his life in prison. Under the trial judge's recommendation, Kohli is expected to remain in prison until at least 2030 at the age of 63.

== Legacy ==
An important link to the arrest of Kohli was information from taxi driver Jason Lepcha, who was regularly hired by Kohli partly because of his understanding of English. Lepcha, one of 12 reward recipients, received ₹367,000 for his role in the arrest. He used this money to buy land to establish a school for disadvantaged children which was named The Hannah Memorial Academy in Foster's memory. When visiting Darjeeling in 2006, Foster's parents heard his story, and on their return to England, worked with others to set up a registered charity which supports Lepcha's school.

== See also ==
- List of solved missing person cases (2000s)
- Murder of Colette Aram
- Murder of Jacqueline Thomas
