= The Hobbit, Southampton =

Hobbit themed pub in Southampton

Coordinates: 50°55′08″N 1°23′43″W

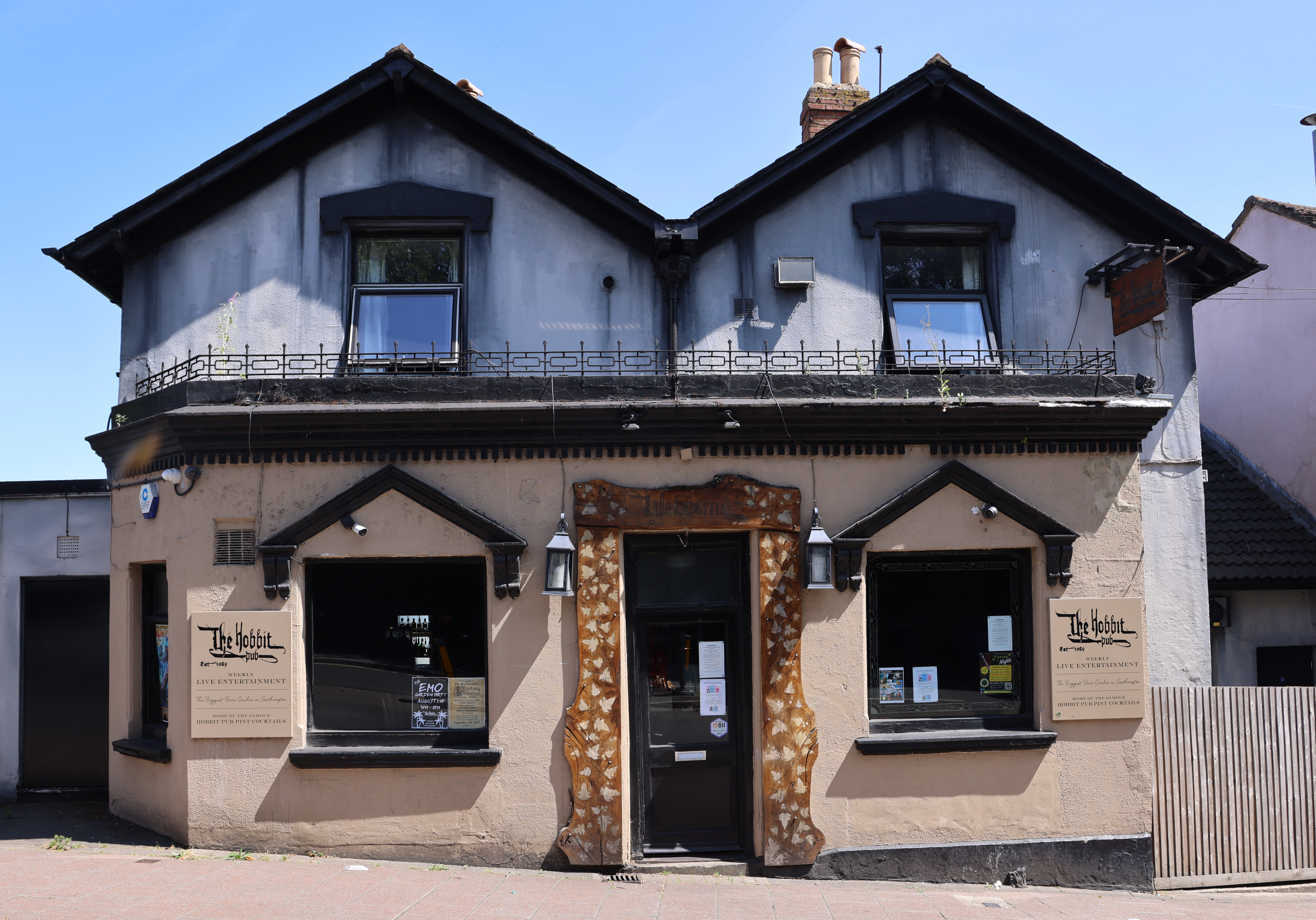
The Hobbit in 2025

The Hobbit is a pub in the Bevois Valley area of Southampton, England. Previously the Portswood Hotel, it was named after J. R. R. Tolkien's book The Hobbit in 1989. The pub was involved in a legal dispute with Middle-earth Enterprises over its use of the name.

== History ==
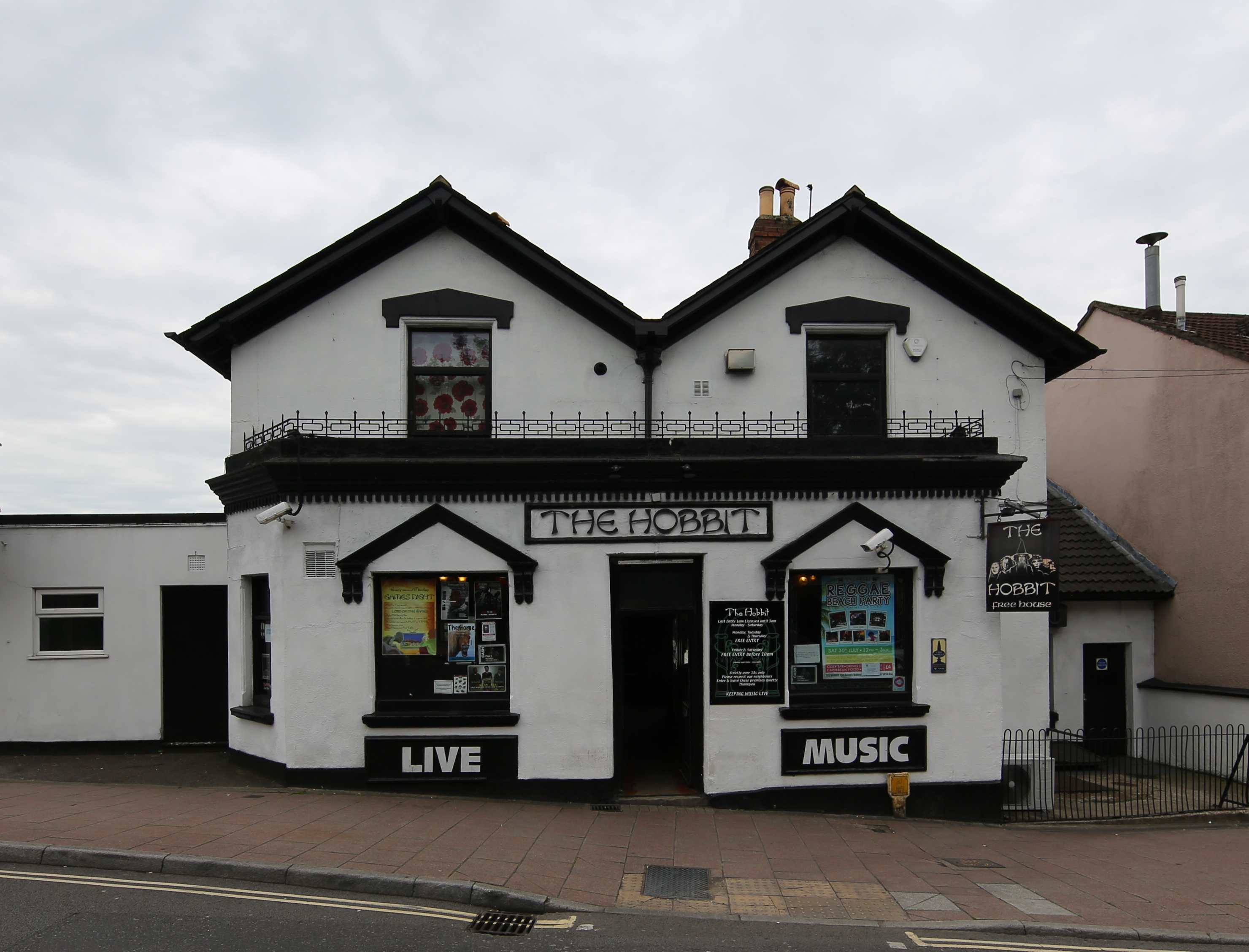
The Hobbit in 2016

Located on Bevois Valley Road, The Hobbit was originally known as the Portswood Hotel, and appears on 19th-century Ordnance Survey mapping. It was renamed The Hobbit in 1989.

The pub is one of several in Southampton owned by Punch Taverns. It was operated by landlord Steve Dockrell prior to his death in October 2008, and was taken over by Stella Roberts in June 2009. In March 2003, it was the last place murdered student, Hannah Foster, was seen alive. The pub won the Best Pub award at the Southern Daily Echo's "Best Bar None" event in 2007. In December 2007 it was forced to close for two weeks as a result of an administrative error over the lease, during which time it was refurbished. From 2010 to 2016, The Hobbit hosted a charity fundraising festival called Messtival. Organised by Seasick Promotions & Management, the event featured both national and local metal, hardcore, and pop-punk bands. In 2017, Roberts stated that the pub might have to close owing to increasing business rates. A crowdfunding appeal was made to support the pub. In September 2019, Jack Andrews took over as landlord. In 2021, the pub underwent a £600,000 renovation. In 2025, the pub was the last place Henry Nowak was seen before his murder.

== Name dispute ==
The name of the pub was inspired by the race of the same name featured in the works of J. R. R. Tolkien; other public houses with the same name exist or have existed in Weston-super-Mare, Monyash (now renamed) and Sowerby Bridge.

In March 2012, Middle-earth Enterprises (which owns the merchandising rights to The Hobbit and The Lord of the Rings) accused the pub of copyright infringement over the use of the Hobbit name. The move was criticised by actors Stephen Fry and Ian McKellen (both of whom later appeared in the Hobbit film series) and by John Denham, Member of Parliament for Southampton Itchen. A Facebook campaign to save The Hobbit was launched, and quickly gained over 50,000 followers. Middle-earth Enterprises offered to license the Hobbit name to the pub, for a fee. Fry and McKellen later offered to contribute to the cost of the licence. The pub held a fundraising event in August 2012, to raise money to pay for its lawyers to continue negotiations.

The Hobbit sold cocktails and shots named after characters from Tolkien's novels The Hobbit and The Lord of the Rings, until it received a cease and desist letter from Middle-earth Enterprises in July 2020.
