= Riot-E =

Finnish media company

Riot Entertainment Ltd
- Trade name: Riot-E
- Industry: Interactive media
- Headquarters: Finland

Riot-E Riot Entertainment Ltd, was a Finnish media company, focused on SMS content mobile phone games that, despite 20 million euros in venture capital invested in them by corporate giants like Nokia, News Corporation and The Carlyle Group, went bankrupt within two years.

On July 4, 2001, RIOT-E’s pay-per-download service had attracted close to 200,000 downloads of X-Men characters and images by subscribers to Japan’s Big Three operators. On July 16, 2001, Riot-E announced that it "will develop interactive games for The Lord of the Rings fans and gaming communities"

The creditors were out 3.2 million euros. Hewlett-Packard and IBM did not get their leasing fees, BT Ignite ended up providing broadband services without compensation, Hertz will not be getting its car leasing fees, Nokia Ventures with 25 percent ownership, and Softbank UK Ventures with 15 percent ownership had nothing to show, operators in the Philippines (Global Handyphone), Italy (Telecom Italia Mobile – TIM), Spain (Telefónica) and Finland (Radiolinja) and the landlord is missing 157,000 euros worth of rent.

The company was such a spectacular failure that it was the subject of the award-winning documentary Riot On!.

Company slogan: "We don't make games, we create riots."
