= The Lord of the Rings Online: War of Three Peaks =

- Developer: Standing Stone Games
- Publisher: Daybreak Game Company
- Engine: Turbine G3
- Platform: Microsoft Windows
- Release: October 20, 2020
- Genre: MMORPG
- Mode: Multiplayer

The Lord of the Rings Online: War of Three Peaks is the eighth expansion for the MMORPG The Lord of the Rings Online, released on October 20, 2020. Announced as a "mini-expansion pack", it is smaller than other expansions in both scope and price, comparable to 2009's Siege of Mirkwood. Unlike all previous expansions, it did not raise the game's level cap. Instead, a new type of quests called "Missions" was introduced, which scale to the player character's level, allowing players across all levels to participate. Story-wise, the War of Three Peaks is a prelude to the Fate of Gundabad expansion released in November 2021 and depicts the beginning of the Seventh War of Dwarves and Orcs, in which the Longbeards led by Prince Durin attempt to reclaim their ancestral home. In addition to the new area situated before the Gates of Gundabad, the expansion also added a new 6-man instance, a 12-man raid and boar mounts inspired by The Hobbit: The Battle of the Five Armies.

== New zone ==
The expansion added a new in-game region of Elderslade, the area in the western Ered Mithrin located north of the Framsburg and directly in front of Mount Gundabad. It includes the outer defenses of the Gundabad Fortress but does not go into the fortress itself. Elderslade is available in two versions, chronologically set before and after the open war between the Dwarves and the Orcs breaks out. The two versions feature the same landscape, but vastly different compositions of fortifications, camps, and forces on both sides, with the second version being a chaotic battlefield. Both versions contain a different set of landscape quests and deeds, with players able to easily travel back-and-forth between the two.

The new Missions, short repeatable instances that scale up to the player character's level, are set around Elderslade and the surrounding regions of Ered Mithrin, the Wells of Langflood and the Vales of Anduin.

== Storyline ==
After the completion of The Black Book of Mordor in the Minas Morgul expansion, two new major storylines began running concurrently for the first time in the game. Volume V: The Peace of Middle-earth continues following the Fellowship, beginning with the wedding of Aragorn and Arwen in Minas Tirith. Meanwhile, The Legacy of Durin and the Trials of the Dwarves is an original storyline, spinning off from the events of "The Black Book". In it, dwarves of the Zhélruka clan from the East set out for the Grey Mountains, seeking to reclaim their ancient halls following the news that the Dark Lord has been defeated. Against his father's wishes, Prince Durin of the Longbeards follows the Zhélruka into Ered Mithrin, where they secure the abandoned stronghold of Skarháld.

=== Chapter 1 ===
Within Skarháld, tensions are brewing between different dwarven clans. Durin's Longbeards are vastly outnumbered by the Zhélruka led by Prince Ingor, with a number of Stout-Axe dwarves recently freed from Mordor added to the mix. His position threatened by the Zhélruka, Durin asks his father King Thorin III Stonehelm for reinforcements, which are granted to him. When an army from Erebor arrives, Durin swears before them to reclaim Gundabad - the ancestral home of the dwarves, which has been held by the orcs for thousands of years. The Stout-Axes and the Zhélruka support his goal, but do not recognize Durin's authority over them. To cool the hot tongues, Durin asks a representative of each clan to join in tracking a large raiding party that had just recently set out from Gundabad.

=== Chapter 2 ===
Longbeard dwarf Gloin, Stout-Axe Imák and Zhélruka Venko are joined by the player in their pursuit of the raiding party across the Misthallow and Floodfells, lands that form the Wells of the Great River Anduin. Working together despite their differences, they travel south until they reach the lands of the Beornings, who crush the raiding party when it attempts to pillage a local village. A dying orc reveals that Gundabad is now ruled by Gorgar, descendant of Azog and Bolg and the brother of Mazog who caused Longbeard dwarves great suffering in their recent failed attempt to reclaim Moria.

=== Chapter 3 ===
Gloin sends messenger-ravens to Durin, who soon meets the player in Floodfells. Despite the player's insistence that Imák and Venko are reliable and trustworthy, Durin continues to hold reservations about Zhélruka who may challenge his claim to Gundabad. The combined host of the dwarves, which includes veterans of the last War of Dwarves and Orcs and the Iron Garrison which was recently pushed out of Moria, marches on Elderslade where they establish a war-camp within the sight of Gundabad. Price Ingor of the Zhélruka is committed to the fight, but refuses to acknowledge Durin's sole claim of leadership.

=== Chapter 4 ===
After the dwarves have some initial success is capturing forward outposts, Gorgar's host pours out of Gundabad to face them on the battlefield. Amidst the chaos of combat, the player fights alongside many dwarves familiar from previous adventures, among them Broin the grandson of Bofur, who now regrets his decision to seal away the legendary mithril-axe Zigilburk at the end of Siege of Mirkwood, believing that it would be a great boon to the dwarves and could help save many lives. Tensions continue to grow between the dwarven clans, as Prince Ingor refuses to commit his troops to be sacrificed at the spearpoint of an attack while trap-making tactics of the Stout-Axes are seen as dishonorable by Longbeards and Zhélruka alike. Durin leads a direct assault on the Gundabad Fortress, engaging Gorgar in combat for the lordship over it. However, Gorgar retreats inside the walls of Gundabad while the exit is blocked by Hrímil Frost-heart, a Frost-Dragon previously fought by the Zhélruka in the Grey Mountains.

=== Interlude ===
Emboldened by his victory over Gorgar, Prince Durin wishes to continue pushing his forces towards Gundabad but Gloin and other dwarven veterans all advise him against it. Humbled, the young Price agrees to ask his father for more warriors to reinforce his success. The player learns about the cost of the last War of Dwarves and Orcs, fought after Azog killed King Thrór. In that war, the dwarves managed to briefly conquer Gundabad but could not hold it, while the Battle of Azanulbizar that ended the war saw the dead dwarves outnumber the survivors despite their victory.

== Soundtrack ==
Like with all game updates since 2018, the music for the War of Three Peaks expansion was composed by Standing Stone Games' in-house composer Bill Champagne. The complete score of 102 minutes in length was released as a playlist on the game's official YouTube channel.
