= The Lord of the Rings Online: Fate of Gundabad =

- Developer: Standing Stone Games
- Publisher: Daybreak Game Company
- Engine: Turbine G3
- Platform: Microsoft Windows
- Release: November 10, 2021
- Genre: MMORPG
- Mode: Multiplayer

The Lord of the Rings Online: Fate of Gundabad is the ninth expansion for the MMORPG The Lord of the Rings Online, released on November 10, 2021. It is a direct sequel to the previous year's War of Three Peaks expansion and concludes the storyline that has been developing over several updates. The expansion raised the level cap to 140, added the region of Gundabad, a new Brawler class and brought a major change to the Legendary Item system introduced in the Mines of Moria.

== Gameplay additions ==
Following the War of Three Peaks that added the outer gates of Gundabad and the lands to the east, the expansion opens Gundabad proper for exploration and adventuring. The Gundabad region consists of seven areas, five of which are located underground while the other two cover the mountain's northern and western slopes. Unlike Mines of Moria, which only had the appearance of vertically stacked levels, Gundabad features proper 3D space, where players can explore multiple vertical levels of the same structures.

The expansion added the "Brawler" class to the game, the first new class since 2014. Inspired by Helm Hammerhand, Brawler is a melee class that forgoes weapons and fights with their hands, outfitted only with heavy gauntlets.

A radical overhaul was made to the Legendary Items that have been an essential part of the game since Mines of Moria. The old system, which involved obtaining, identifying, imbuing and deconstructing items, levelling legacies and applying titles, heritage runes, relics and scrolls has been entirely scrapped. It was replaced by a system where items grow in power with player's level without a separate progression track while skill-modifying "traceries" can be slotted and swapped at will, much like the Essence equipment introduced in Gondor. Existing items from the old system remained usable but could not be advanced further, only exchanged for the new Legendary Item currency.

== Storyline ==
The expansion concludes The Legacy of Durin and the Trials of the Dwarves storyline from the War of Three Peaks expansion.

=== Chapter 5 ===
His forces bolstered by reinforcements from Erebor, Prince Durin leads the dwarven host inside Mount Gundabad. Among their numbers are both dwarves from the Iron Garrison's recent failed attempt to reclaim Moria and veterans of the previous War of Dwarves in Orcs in which Gundabad was similarly captured only to be lost again, causing many to remain cautious despite their success.

=== Chapter 6 ===
Advancing past their initial staging ground, the dwarves discover that Gundabad orcs led by Gorgar the Ruthless, heir of Azog, are not in full control of the mountains. Hobgoblins of the Frost-horde, followers of the dragon Hrímil Frost-Heart, have come to Gundabad and seek to displace the orcs. Their position grows stronger every day, and many orcs being to doubt the leadership of Gorgar.

=== Chapter 7 ===
Bosi, Bori and Broin of the Iron Garrison prove themselves by bravely exploring the Hobgoblin-infested areas of the Mountain-home. To the north of the mountain, Angmarim cultists come across the Misty Mountains, the last remnants of the failed attempt to restore their kingdom during Shadows of Angmar. They bring with them arcane artifacts, the purpose of which greatly troubles Zhélruka Prince Ingór.

=== Chapter 8 ===
The dwarves suffer their first serious defeat when Gorgar attacks their positions and kills many, wielding a hammer made of pure mithril. The Angmarim cultists use the artifacts brought with them to breach the warding runes on the sacred chamber where Durin first awoke and steal an artifact treasured beyond value - the very first Black Anvil used by the first of the Dwarven forefathers.

=== Chapter 9 ===
A captured goblin servant of Gorgar reveals that the orc fell under the influence of the dragon Hrímil, acknowledging her lordship over Gundabad. More alarmingly, the goblin claims that Hrímil boasted of doing the same to Prince Durin, speaking to him from afar and influencing him to begin his march of Gundabad before he was fully ready. The mere suggestion of this sends Durin into a fit of rage. The goblin is granted freedom after helping to steal the mithril hammer from Gorgar.

=== Chapter 10 ===
Durin journeys deep beneath Gundabad by secret paths. He has an experience that causes him to remember the previous six lives he had, confirming that he is indeed Durin the Seventh returned to life. Durin confides in the player the knowledge that none alive possess: Hrímil is afraid of the mithril hammer because it reminds her of the wounds sustained from fighting Durin the Deathless during the First Age.

=== Chapter 11 ===
Durin summons the dwarves of all clans to a Dwarrowmoot to set aside their differences and unite in fighting for Gundabad. As the dwarven host engages the orcs and hobgoblins, the Angmarim cultists bring the Black Anvil to the highest peak of Gundabad, believing they can bring the entire mountain down with it. Gorgar tries to get away from the Hrímil's influence but succumbs to the dragon's voice and is killed while fighting her enemies. The cultists are defeated and a strike of the mithil hammer against the Black Anvil causes such a reverberation in the mountains that Hrímil abandons Gundabad and flees to her lair where she is killed. The dwarves face no further opposition in reclaiming their ancestral home, which Durin promises will belong not only to Longbeards but to all dwarves.

== Soundtrack ==
Music for the Fate of Gundabad expansion was composed by Standing Stone Games' in-house composer Bill Champagne. Champagne has been responsible for all new LotRO music since 2018, which he composes using Cubase 10 digital audio workstation. Because the expansion brings resolution to several long-running storylines, Champagne was able to pull from many existing themes, bringing a total number of themes in the expansion to nearly fifty. The complete score of 3 hours in length was released as a playlist on the game's official YouTube channel.

== Critical reception ==
The expansion received positive reviews. Chris Bowman of gamespace.com gave it a 9.5/10, complementing the new environment and class and only deducting points for promised features that were delayed until a subsequent patch. Joseph Bradford of mmorpg.com gave high praise to the story and lore, which he felt were "a return to form for the studio". He noted however that the game was showing its age with the lag and fps performance issues, giving the expansion a final score of 8.0/10.
