= Middle-earth Collectible Card Game =

1995 collectible card game

- MECCG card back portraying the lidless eye of Sauron.
- Designers: Coleman Charlton, Mike Reynolds
- Years active: 1995–1998
- Players: 1 or more
- Setup time: < 15 minutes
- Playing time: > 1 hour
- Chance: Medium
- Skills: Card playing Dice rolling Strategic thought

Middle-earth Collectible Card Game (MECCG) is an out-of-print collectible card game released by Iron Crown Enterprises in late 1995. It is the first CCG based on J. R. R. Tolkien's fictional universe of Middle-earth, with added content from ICE's Middle-earth Role Playing Game.

The cards used in the game feature original artwork by a multitude of artists, many of them longtime Tolkien illustrators such as John Howe, Ted Nasmith, and Angus McBride.

== Overview ==
In its basic form, it is a game for one to five players, each choosing one of the five wizards to represent themselves. A turn in the game consists of one player's wandering around Middle-earth with the help of famous characters of Middle-earth, trying to gather influence and power to aid in the battle against The Dark Lord, while another player tries to harass, and ultimately kill his characters with specific hazard cards. Then, for each player's turn, the roles change clockwise around the table (the player who was moving his characters then throws hazards at the player to his or her right). Any player may also win by acquiring and destroying the One Ring after a complicated set of events.

Later expansions have added the possibility to take the role of a Ringwraith of Sauron (MELE), a corrupted wizard playing by his own rules (MEWH), the malevolent Balrog (MEBA), or even Sauron himself. The game is somewhat distinguished from most other CCG's with the use of two six-sided dice for a random factor and also by the actual map of Middle-earth, including regions your companies travel through, and site cards they visit.

MECCG won two Origins Awards: Best Card Game of 1995 for MECCG: The Wizards and Best Graphic Presentation of a Card Game or Expansion of 1996 for MECCG: The Dragons. The game's production ended in 1999, when ICE lost the license that allowed them to use the content of Tolkien's The Lord of the Rings and The Hobbit. This license was later bought by Decipher, who used it to bring out another CCG. MECCG still has a relatively loyal and active fanbase of players.

== Online activity ==
The game can be played online through the use of the Generic Collectible Card Game (GCCG), allowing normal or sealed games. MECCG online events are organized several times a year and every player is free to participate in them. A web-based game variant is active at https://cardnum.net/

== Card sets ==
- The Wizards (METW) (Limited - December, 1995; Unlimited - March, 1996): The first basic set, dealing with the good side, including most main characters from the books, like Gandalf, Frodo and Aragorn. Pretty straightforward gameplay with relatively simple marshalling point cards and hazard creatures. The 484-card set was sold in 76-card starter decks and 15-card booster packs, with 121 rare cards, 121 uncommon cards, and 242 cards that were either common or fixed.
  - The Dragons (METD) (June, 1996): The first expansion set for METW. As the name implies, deals mostly with dragons, their treasure and the northern regions. The 180-card set was sold in 15-card booster packs having one rare card, 4 uncommons, and 10 commons and a six-page rules addendum.
  - Dark Minions (MEDM) (November, 1996): Adds many powerful hazard cards including more undead and introduces the agents - a subtle group of Sauron's servants, concentrating on intrigue and influence. Also adds an underground network of site cards, The Under-Deeps, which later becomes The Balrog's realm. This set had 180 cards.
- The Lidless Eye (MELE) (June, 1997): The second basic set. Adds the possibility to play as a Ringwraith of Sauron. The 417-card set was sold in 76-card fixed starter decks and 15-card booster packs.
  - Against the Shadow (MEAS) (August, 1997): The only expansion to MELE, although it also contains hero cards. Mostly balances the game by adding resources for and hazards against the minion player as well as some support resources for the hero. Notable are the hazard creature versions of the five wizards. The set, consisting of over 160 cards, was sold in 12-card booster packs.
- The White Hand (MEWH) (December, 1997): Introduces a third faction, the corrupted Fallen-Wizard, whose player can use both hero and minion resources and characters, although with restrictions. The 122-card set was sold in 12-card booster packs each containing two rare cards.
- Middle Earth Challenge Decks (MECD) (1998): Ten decks for tournament play. These were sold as 110-card starter decks with cards reprinted from earlier sets fixed to a particular character (one of five Wizards or one of five Ringwraiths), and also included a map and a rulebook.
- The Balrog (MEBA) (February, 1999): Adds a new sub-faction to the minions, Balrog, who mainly depends on the brute strength of his orcs and trolls. It is argued by the player base that since the production of MECCG ended after MEBA, the set remains a bit overpowered because it didn't get a "balancing set" published afterwards. This 104-card set was beset by delays and eventually released in February, 1999, in two fixed 132-card decks.

An expansion set named The Dwarf Lords was planned for September, 1998, and the set The Elf Lords was scheduled for mid-1999. Both were indefinitely postponed in November, 1998.

== Books ==
ICE Publications:

- Middle-earth: The Wizards Companion (#3333):ISBN 1-55806-275-0
- Middle-earth: The Wizards Player Guide (#3334):ISBN 1-55806-257-2
- Middle-earth: The Dragons Player's Guide (#3337):ISBN 1-55806-290-4
- Middle-earth CCG Maps (#3338):ISBN 1-55806-291-2
- Middle-earth: Dark Minions Player Guide (#3339):ISBN 1-55806-294-7
- Middle-earth: The Wizards Casual Companion (#3340):ISBN 1-55806-312-9
- Middle-earth: The Lidless Eye Companion (#3341):ISBN 1-55806-315-3
- Middle-earth: The Lidless Eye Player Guide (#3342):ISBN 1-55806-339-0
- A Long Expected Party: MECCG Sites & Scenarios (#3343):ISBN 1-55806-352-8

Independent Publications:

- Mastering Middle-Earth: Strategies for Middle-Earth : The Wizards ISBN 1-55622-559-8

== Reception ==
Andy Butcher reviewed Middle Earth: The Wizards for Arcane magazine, rating it a 7 out of 10 overall. Butcher comments that "If you're willing to put in the effort (and buy quite a lot of cards), there's plenty here to make it all worthwhile. At the end of the day, though, I for one can't help wishing that one person got to play Gandalf while the other took on the role of Sauron, leading to a far more direct and involving conflict."

Andy Butcher reviewed Middle Earth: The Dragons for Arcane magazine, rating it an 8 out of 10 overall. Butcher comments that " Impressively, Middle-earth: The Dragons manages to emphasise the positive aspects of the game, without adding greatly to the already weighty rules."

Rick Swan, in a review of The Wizards release in The Duelist, stated that the game "has enough quirky innovation to distinguish it from the multitude of play-’em-and-forget-’em copycats" of Magic: The Gathering, and that it was "as faithful an adaptation" of the Tolkien novels that could be expected in a card game. He also stated that the artist's commissioned for the set "reads like a cavalcade of the industry's heaviest hitters" and the artwork they produced for it could be framed to hang on a wall. He said that the rulebook was poorly organized, with novice players having to scour the booklet for definitions of gameplay terms. Overall, he states that the game "may not always soar, but it never sinks."

== Reviews ==
- Backstab #1
- Backstab #2 (Dark Minions)
- Backstab #6 (Against the Shadows)
- Backstab #8 (The White Hand)
- Świat Gier Komputerowych #54

== See also ==
- The Lord of the Rings: The Card Game & Adventure Card Game (LCG)

== Bibliography ==
- Appelcline, Shannon (2011). Designers & Dragons. Mongoose Publishing. ISBN 978-1-907702-58-7.
- Miller, John Jackson; Greenholdt, Joyce (2003). Collectible Card Games Checklist & Price Guide (2nd ed.). Krause Publication. ISBN 0-87349-623-X.
