= The Lord of the Rings: Gollum =

2023 video game

- Developer: Daedalic Entertainment
- Publisher: Nacon
- Producers: Harald Riegler; Daniel Bernard; Kai Fiebig
- Designers: Martin Willkes; Sebastian Schmidt
- Programmers: Maic Hanse; Ann-Kathrin Drews
- Artist: Mathias Fischer
- Writers: Tilman Schanen; Damiri Knapheide; Benjamin Kuhn; Jeffery Thompson Jr.
- Composer: Jun Broome
- Series: Middle-earth
- Engine: Unreal Engine 4
- Platforms: PlayStation 4; PlayStation 5; Windows; Xbox One; Xbox Series X/S
- Release: 25 May 2023
- Genre: Action-adventure
- Mode: Single-player

The Lord of the Rings: Gollum is an action-adventure game developed by Daedalic Entertainment. The game, set in the fictional world of Middle-earth created by J. R. R. Tolkien, takes place in between the events of The Hobbit and The Fellowship of the Ring. The player controls Gollum through a series of locations, such as Cirith Ungol, Barad-dûr, and Mirkwood, as he attempts to find Bilbo Baggins and retake the One Ring whilst battling and avoiding Sauron. It was announced in March 2019 and delayed from its September 2021 launch window.

The Lord of the Rings: Gollum released on 25 May 2023 for PlayStation 4, PlayStation 5, Windows, Xbox One and Xbox Series X/S. The game was a commercial failure and received negative reviews from critics. It was ranked by Metacritic as the worst game of 2023.

Its poor reception and sales caused Daedalic Entertainment to cancel plans for a second Lord of the Rings game and close their development division, laying off their staff and moving to a publishing-only model. It was later reported that they had imposed poor working conditions, which had affected development of Gollum.

== Gameplay ==
Objectives in the game usually involve following a character or finding a specific item.

The Lord of the Rings: Gollum is an action-adventure game played from a third-person perspective. (Note: When swimming, the game switches to a first-person perspective.) Gollum can climb around levels, using marked ledges and vines to traverse environments. In hostile areas, the player must avoid guards, triggering an instant game over if the player is caught. Long grass and shadows provide a way for the player to hide, and if a helmetless orc is encountered, they can be taken out. A button can be pressed to highlight useful objects or waypoints if the player becomes lost or confused.

Periodically, the player can select between dialogue representing the "Gollum" and "Sméagol" sides of Gollum, as well as make moral choices such as whether to kill a beetle.

== Synopsis ==
=== Setting and characters ===
The Lord of the Rings: Gollum occurs between the events of J. R. R. Tolkien's novel The Hobbit, or There and Back Again—when Bilbo Baggins obtains the One Ring—and The Fellowship of the Ring, the first volume of The Lord of the Rings. The game depicts Gollum's capture, as described in Tolkien's Unfinished Tales. (Note: Unfinished Tales states that Gollum's capture occurred in 3017, while the game states it occurred in 3012.)

=== Plot ===
In the year 3017 of the Third Age, 66 years after Bilbo Baggins obtains the One Ring from Gollum in the Misty Mountains, (Note: As depicted in The Hobbit) Aragorn captures Gollum in the Dead Marshes and turns him over to Gandalf. Gollum had reached the confines of Mordor in 2980, meeting Shelob. (Note: As depicted in Appendix B of The Lord of the Rings) Gollum retells the events of the previous five years to Gandalf.

In the year 3012, Gollum is in Mordor. He follows a bird into Mount Doom. Gollum follows several orcs and attempts to ambush them, although he himself is easily taken down by the orcs. Three Nazgûl then surround Gollum and force him into telling them that Baggins took the One Ring to The Shire.

Gollum awakens in a slave pit beneath Barad-dûr. He begins life as a slave, where a frail man teaches him to do the work expected of him. Gollum is eventually tasked with helping the frail man steal tower plans and ultimately assists him with blowing up a bridge in a bid for freedom, but he is caught by the orcs. Attempting to save himself from execution, Gollum blames either the frail man or an orc that steals his food, and he is subsequently freed.

The following day, Gollum dispenses food in the Breeding Pits. He is taken to the Tower where he meets the Candle Man, who questions him. Gollum blames either a mine orc or himself. Gollum's life is spared. Weeks later, he hatches a bird egg. He names the bird "Little One" and befriends it. The Candle Man forces Gollum to serve him.

Years later, Gollum befriends a new prisoner and helps him survive prison life. They become friends in the process. Eventually, Gollum decides he no longer wants to be in prison and escapes with his friend. Gollum is able to sneak out of Mordor, but his friend is captured and eaten by Shelob.

Gollum is captured by the elves of Mirkwood and interrogated by Gandalf. Gollum teams up with Mell, a blind elf, in order to escape. The two seek Mell's mentor and the source of the magic that keeps Mirkwood impassable. The Candle Man finds Gollum at the source of the magic and tries to take the magic for Sauron, but Gollum stops him. Gollum then leaves Mirkwood to find the Shire, but he becomes trapped in the mines of Moria behind its locked entrance.

== Development ==
The game uses Unreal Engine 4 and supports deep learning super sampling (DLSS).

=== Music ===
In contrast to soundtracks, such as the recordings for The Lord of the Rings film series, the composers sought to create an original track, using violins, violas, bass clarinets, clarinets, baritone saxophones, flutes, and an assortment of percussion instruments. The contrast between Gollum and Sméagol was taken into consideration.

=== Release ===
The Lord of the Rings: Gollum was announced by Daedalic Entertainment in March 2019. The game was originally scheduled for release in 2021. With the Nacon agreement announcement, it was delayed to 2022. On 24 May 2022, it was announced on the game's Twitter page that the developers were targeting a release on 1 September 2022, for Steam and the PlayStation and Xbox consoles. The Nintendo Switch version was announced to be coming on 30 November 2022. On 25 July 2022, the developers announced a further delay of "a few months". After missing its planned 2022 release dates, Nacon announced that the game was set for a May 2023 release for Steam, PlayStation, and Xbox, with a Switch version later in the same year. In September, Famitsu reported that the Switch version was planned to release first in Japan during the holiday season, published by 3goo. The port was initially scheduled to release in Japan on 14 December 2023, but was delayed indefinitely.

The first cinematic teaser trailer was released on 24 August 2020, while gameplay trailers were released on 6 July 2021 and 7 July 2022. A story trailer was released on 9 March 2023.

Days before the game was set to release, on 23 May, full footage of the game was leaked onto YouTube before being taken down several hours later.

=== Additional content ===
On 15 April, Daedalic Entertainment and Nacon announced that a "Precious Edition" would be released, featuring concept art, a compendium, the game's soundtrack, 6 iconic emotes inspired by the character Gollum, and additional voice acting in Sindarin.

== Reception ==
Reception

Aggregate scores
| Aggregator | Score |
|---|---|
| Metacritic | (PC) 38/100 (PS5) 33/100 (XSXS) 43/100 |
| OpenCritic | 4% |

Review scores
| Publication | Score |
|---|---|
| Digital Trends | 1/5 (Note: Digital Trends was initially unable to review the game due to repeated crashes, but reviewed the game after the game was patched.) |
| Eurogamer | 1/5 |
| Game Informer | 3.5/10 |
| GameSpot | 2/10 |
| GamesRadar+ | 2/5 |
| Hardcore Gamer | 2/5 |
| IGN | 4/10 |
| PC Gamer (US) | 64/100 |
| PCGamesN | 3/10 |
| Push Square | 2/10 |
| Shacknews | 6/10 |
| The Guardian | 1/5 |

The Lord of the Rings: Gollum "was panned by critics and players and met with low sales". On Metacritic, the game received "generally unfavorable reviews", and 4% of critics recommended the game on OpenCritic. Metacritic listed the PlayStation 5 version the worst game of 2023, attributing this to its gameplay, controls, visuals, bugs, and requirement for extensive knowledge of Tolkien's literature.

The Guardian's Nic Reuben criticized the camera movement and the game's many bugs that rendered the game difficult to play, saying "the whole game feels profoundly unstable, as if a stiff digital breeze would bring the entire thing down". Sam Pape of GameSpot disliked the mission design as the game's "most glaring issue", noting that "sans a few slightly more in-depth objectives at big story moments, the majority of your tasks amount to some version of, Follow the person! Collect the thing! or, in one case, literally Stand in line!". Rachel Watts of Rock Paper Shotgun felt that while the game picked up in the second half, the first eight hours "are nothing short of a slog".

The game's technical aspects and stability were criticized. Digital Trends could not initially score the game due to persistent crashes until a day-one patch was released, the first time in the publication's history. Others faulted the user interface and perceived downgrading of Gollum's character model since the game's announcement.

=== Publisher response ===
In June 2023, as a result of the game's poor reception, Daedalic Entertainment announced they would close their development division and focus solely on its publishing business, while cancelling plans for a second Lord of the Rings game. In a statement to Polygon, Daedalic said that Gollum "did not live up to the expectations we had for the game", but that they would continue to release another patch for it, and planned to appoint employees being laid off to other positions in their network.

On 7 October 2023, German publication "Game Two" published a report after contacting 32 people who worked on the game, alleging that Daedalic and Nacon had imposed uncompensated overtime, attempted to pay staff below the minimum wage, and created a toxic work environment caused by abusive leadership. It was also claimed that an apology posted on social media was generated by the publisher Nacon using ChatGPT, and that the budget of the game was around €15 million, which is not considered sufficient for a AAA game and led to some parts of the game being cut.

== See also ==
- Middle-earth in video games
- List of video games notable for negative reception
