= J.R.R. Tolkien's The Lord of the Rings, Vol. I (1994 video game) =

The Lord of the Rings, Vol. I
- North American box art
- Developer: Interplay Productions
- Publisher: Interplay Productions
- Platform: Super Nintendo Entertainment System
- Release: NA: October 1994; EU: May 23, 1995
- Genre: Action role-playing
- Modes: Single player, Multiplayer

J.R.R. Tolkien's The Lord of the Rings, Vol. I is a 1994 action role-playing game developed and published by Interplay Productions for the Super Nintendo Entertainment System. It is an adaptation of The Fellowship of the Ring by J. R. R. Tolkien.

== Gameplay ==
The player begins the game as Frodo Baggins, and progressively acquires the remaining members of the Fellowship; Samwise Gamgee, Peregrin Took, Meriadoc Brandybuck, Aragorn, Legolas, Gimli, and Gandalf (Boromir strangely only makes a single brief appearance). With the addition of extra controllers and the Super Multitap, the game supported more than four players. Players could play as Frodo, Samwise, Pippin, Merry, Gimli, and Aragorn. Using cheats or an emulator, players could also play as a non-combatant Legolas or Gandalf, supporting up to 8 players (although Legolas cannot do anything but move around and take damage). Any characters not controlled by the player(s) are controlled by the computer A.I..

The game progresses through a series of "fetch quests" in which the player must explore vast environments to retrieve items relevant to the game's story. These items are often simple trinkets that have been misplaced by the game's non-player characters (NPCs). Much like the book, the game begins in the Shire, the land of the Hobbits. The game's plot takes the player to various locations from the book, such as the village of Bree, the elven city of Rivendell, and the Mines of Moria. Unlike the book, however, the finale of the game is the fight between the Fellowship and the Balrog creature in the Mines of Moria (the first volume of the book ends significantly later).

If a character dies, the death is permanent and the player cannot use them for the rest of the game.

The sequel, The Lord of the Rings: Volume II, was meant to pick up where Part I left off, but due to poor sales, no sequel was ever released on the Super Nintendo Entertainment System.

Hobbiton

== Reception ==
Reception

Review scores
Publication	Score
1Up.com	2/10
VideoGames & Computer Entertainment	7/10

GamePro panned the game, citing gameplay dominated by "long, indistinguishable romps", overly small character and enemy sprites, limited character upgrade features, poor support character AI, and low difficulty. In contrast, Electronic Gaming Monthly remarked "a slower-paced RPG for more deliberate playing ... This game has rewards for the patient player." They scored it a 6.6 out of 10.

The game was poorly received in a 2004 1up.com review, citing poor AI and hours of "lengthy and boring" fetch quests.

== See also ==
- J.R.R. Tolkien's The Lord of the Rings, Vol. I (1990 video game) - a different 1990 video game with the same title for MS-DOS, Amiga, PC-98 and FM Towns
