= J.R.R. Tolkien's The Lord of the Rings, Vol. II: The Two Towers =

1992 role-playing video game

- Cover art by Brothers Hildebrandt
- Developer: Interplay Productions
- Publisher: Interplay Productions
- Composer: Charles Deenen
- Platforms: MS-DOS, PC-98, FM Towns
- Release: NA/EU: 1992 (DOS); JP: 1993 (PC-98, FM-Towns)
- Genre: Role-playing
- Mode: Single player

J.R.R. Tolkien's The Lord of the Rings, Vol. II: The Two Towers is a video game published by Interplay Productions. It is an adaptation of The Two Towers by J. R. R. Tolkien, which is the second volume in The Lord of the Rings.

The game was released in 1992 for MS-DOS, PC-98, and FM Towns. It is a sequel to J.R.R. Tolkien's The Lord of the Rings, Vol. I.

An Amiga version, and a second sequel, were canceled.

== Gameplay ==
The gameplay is similar to that of the first game. It is a role-playing game wherein the player controls multiple characters from the book. It uses a top-down perspective. The game takes place slightly before its predecessor ends: at the dark forest of Fangorn. The story splits into several journeys of different characters similar to the book, the game also switches between different controllable parties. The ultimate goal is to reach Mount Doom and destroy the One Ring, though this is never accomplished in-game as these final scenes were intended for the canceled Volume III.

== Reception ==
Computer Gaming World approved of the game's use of predetermined switching between characters, stating that it gives Towers "a depth of narrative which would not otherwise have been possible". The magazine concluded that those who enjoyed the first game in the series would enjoy its sequel, while newcomers might be confused but "still find Towers a worthy piece of entertainment".
