= The Lord of the Rings Online: Minas Morgul =

- Developer: Standing Stone Games
- Publisher: Daybreak Game Company
- Engine: Turbine G3
- Platform: Microsoft Windows
- Release: November 5, 2019
- Genre: MMORPG
- Mode: Multiplayer

The Lord of the Rings Online: Minas Morgul is the seventh expansion for the MMORPG The Lord of the Rings Online, released on November 5, 2019. It raised the game's level cap from 120 to 130 and added the Morgul Vale and dead city of Minas Morgul as well as seven new group instances and a new raid set in Shelob's lair. The expansion also introduced the seventh playable race of Stout-Axe Dwarves, whom players who pre-ordered it could access prior to the release date.

== Storyline ==
Set after the downfall of Sauron, Minas Morgul concludes the storyline of "The Black Book of Mordor" which began with the Mordor expansion in 2017.

=== Chapter 11 ===
Waken from the centuries of slumber, the shade of Isildur reveals to Glorfindel, Elrond, Gandalf and the player his sorry tale: the King who cursed the Men of Dunharrow to an unending existence for breaking their oaths had failed to fulfill the oath of his own – to deliver the Enemy's One Ring to Rivendell – causing his spirit to linger in the Gladden Fields after his death until the river-maiden of Gladden found him and put him to slumber to ease his suffering. To fill the gaps in their knowledge, Isildur tells them of his last years and the War of the Great Alliance against Sauron at the end of the Second Age.

=== Chapter 12 ===
Isildur's tale complete, the shade is no closer to ending its existence. The once-King reveals that he is tormented by a vision of a rotating beacon under the sign of a crescent moon. This describes the highest chamber in the Tower of Minas Ithil, and Gandalf theorizes that this is where Isildur's remains are kept after they have been dug out by the Enemy's servants searching for the One Ring in the Gladden. Their affairs in the North put aside, Gandalf and the player return to Mordor, with Gandalf continuing to poring over the mysterious Black Book of Mordor found in the Iron Hills.

=== Chapter 13 ===
While the player was away in the North, the soldiers of Gondor have made effort to establish footholds in Gorgoroth and King Elessar now tasks the Rangers of Ithilien led by Steward Faramir with reclaiming the Morgul Vale and cleansing the Dead City of evil that lies within. Meanwhile, the Gúrzyul Ugrukhôr and Lhaereth send their forces to attack the city as well, for it has become the domain of Gothmog, the Witch-King's servant who had fled from the Battle of the Pelennor Fields and had been hiding within the city walls ever since. Lhaereth and Ugrukhôr's hatred for Gothmog and his servants creates enough chaos to allow the player and a group of Rangers to sneak into the city, but their entry into Gothmog's tower is barred a Watching-Stone Spirit. Gandalf devises a plan to fool the spirit with the mask of the Weeping Warrior Karazgar, which he took after disarming him in Ered Mithrin. He and the player ask Ayorzén, the Easterling war-master knowledgeable in the Enemy's affairs, to impersonate Karazgar and the Easterling agrees.

=== Chapter 14 ===
Disguised as the Weeping Warrior, Ayorzén takes the player and a Grey Company Ranger to deliver as prisoners to Gothmog and the spirit allows them to pass. Upon seeing the Dread Terror himself, Ayorzén immediately flees while the player and the Ranger battle the wraith. The player eventually overpowers Gothmog by reminding him of his many defeats when Ugrukhôr and his minions arrive seeking the same goal. Gothmog stabs him in the back in his last act of defiance before expiring himself, his mortal existence finally at its end. The player finds and retrieves the casket with the dust that once was Isildur's bones, which Gandalf arranges to deliver to Rivendell. With both the King of Gondor and the Enemy's Ring having arrived to the House of Elrond, the oath of Isildur is finally fulfilled and he peacefully passes from the world.

=== Epilogue ===
In the end, the Black Book is revealed not to be an artifact of Sauron's evil but the work of a Zhélruka dwarf who lived almost a thousand years ago. After the battle of Fornost the dwarf Voin had met the prince of Gondor Eärnur and adventured with him and his knights for many years. When the time came for Eärnur to succeed his father on the throne, Voin parted ways with his friends and returned home. But when Voin learned that Eärnur had ridden to the gates of Minas Morgul to confront the Witch-King and was never seen again, he abandoned the life he had and went to search for his friend. Voin entered Mordor as a slave and after much struggle and hardship made his way to the Dread City, where he found Eärnur still alive but unable to leave because of the Witch-King's enchantment put on him. Voin provided comfort to his friend during his long torture, until he was eventually unmade and reborn as a wraith named Mordirith in the service of the Witch-King. Seeing his friend not just killed but erased, turned into a creature of evil who no longer recognized him, made Voin write his account in a Mordor-bound tome so that the memory of the man Eärnur was would not be forgotten. Voin then left Mordor and returned to his home in the Iron Hills, where the Black Book was eventually found.

== New zones ==
The expansions adds two new areas to the game: Imlad Morgul (the Morgul Vale) and Mordor Besieged. The Morgul Vale connects Northern Ithilien in Gondor to the Plateau of Gorgoroth in Mordor. In addition to the Dead City it also contains the Pass of Cirith Ungol, Shelob's Lair (Torech Ungol) and the hidden valley of Thuringwath. Minas Morgul itself is divided into five distinct circles, each posing unique dangers to those who dare venture there.

Mordor Besieged is unique from all other previous areas: instead of being contemporary to the main story of The Lord of the Rings it is chronologically set in the Second Age 3440, the penultimate year of the War of the Last Alliance. Previously the game had only depicted the past events through either flashbacks in which the player character could only observe but not participate or "Session Plays" in which the player controlled a historical character with a limited amount of skills in a short self-contained instanced mission. In contrast to those, Mordor Besieged is a full-fledged area with all elements of the regular gameplay such as exploration, crafting facilities, NPC quest-givers and vendors. Located in the same geographical space as Dol Amarth in the regular version of Mordor, it allows the player to interact with historical figures such as Gil-Galad, Elendil and Anárion, explained in-game as the player's character listening to an account of a hero of that age and imagining themselves in their place.

== Soundtrack ==
Like with several preceding game updates, all music for the expansion was composed by Standing Stone Games' in-house composer Bill Champagne. The complete score, more than four hours in length, was released as a playlist on the game's official YouTube channel.

== Critical reception ==
Gamespace.com gave the expansion a 8.5/10, complimenting new areas and the story, but criticizing the filler quests and missions which make the players wait for a timer to run out. Joseph Bradford of MMORPG.com had a mixed reaction to the expansion, giving praise to the story and the surroundings but noting the frustration with the game systems which he felt to be outdated.
