= The Lord of the Rings: The Card Game =

2011 fantasy strategy card game

- Other names: Der Herr der Ringe: Das Kartenspiel; Pán prstenů: Karetní hra Le Seigneur des Anneaux: Le jeu de cartes O Senhor dos Anéis: Card Game; El Señor de los Anillos: El Juego de Cartas; Il Signore degli Anelli: Il Gioco di Carte; Władca Pierścieni: Gra Karciana; Ο Άρχοντας των Δαχτυλιδιών 魔戒：卡牌版
- Designers: Nate French
- Publishers: Fantasy Flight Games (physical); Asmodee Digital (digital)
- Publication: 20 April 2011; 15 years ago 29 August 2019; 7 years ago
- Years active: 2011 – present
- Genres: Co-operative Living Card Game (LCG) with Deck Building
- Languages: English, German, French, Portuguese, Spanish, Italian, Greek, Polish, Czech, Chinese
- Players: 1 - 4 (Best with 1 to 2 players)
- Setup time: < 5 minutes (excluding deck building)
- Playing time: 30 - 90 minutes (typical: 60 minutes)
- Chance: Some (card drawing, deck building)
- Age range: 12+ (13+ recommended)
- Skills: Card playing, Deck building, Logic, Strategy
- Materials required: Optional: Pen and paper for scoring
- Media type: Playing cards
- Website: The Card Game; Adventure Card Game

The Lord of the Rings: The Card Game is a card game produced by Fantasy Flight Games since 2011. As part of the Living Card Game (LCG) genre, it is a cooperative and strategic card game set in Middle-earth, a fantasy world featured in literary works by J. R. R. Tolkien, including The Hobbit and The Lord of the Rings.

Its digital adaptation, titled The Lord of the Rings: Adventure Card Game, is published by Asmodee Digital since 2019 for cross-platform play on Microsoft Windows, macOS, PlayStation 4, Xbox One and Nintendo Switch, being the "first ever digital LCG".

== Mechanics ==
Like other card games in Fantasy Flight's "Living Card Game" line, it has deck construction and regularly released expansions similar to a collectible card game, but without the randomized card distribution.

The game may be played either solitaire or with a group. The revised core set released in 2022 supports up to four players, whereas the original core set supported up to 2 players with a single core set, and up to 4 players can play with an additional core set. Unlike most card games of this type, this game is a cooperative game; the players are not opponents, but work together against an "encounter deck" which represents the forces of Sauron and produces the obstacles that the players have to conquer.

Each player has their own cards: their heroes (up to 3) which start in play, and a deck of at least 50 cards, composed of Allies, Attachments (such as weapons, armor, and other items), and Events. Although the core set comes with pre-constructed decks, deck construction is a major aspect of the game, and many players build their own decks, utilising cards from the various expansions.

== Community ==
The Lord of the Rings Living Card Game has an active following, with multiple podcasts and blogs dedicated to discussing gameplay, strategy, deck-building, and news, as well as providing custom content. Podcasts include Card Talk Cardboard of the Rings, The Grey Company, and The Mouth of Sauron. Blogs include Tales From the Cards, Hall of Beorn, Master of Lore, Dor Cuarthol, and Vision of the Palantir. Rings DB provides an online platform for generating and sharing decks and quest experiences.

== Revised Core and New Distribution Model ==
In September 2021, FFG announced plans to release a revised core set as well as adopting a new distribution model for expansions and player cards. The revised core sought to incorporate player concerns by (1) providing support for 4 players out of the box, (2) providing 3 copies of all player cards, and (3) adding a campaign mode that also serves to smooth out some of the difficulty challenges with the introductory scenarios, especially when playing true solo. Specifically, many expansions that were previously distributed over multiple products have been combined into one or two boxes (with a campaign mode added). In addition to the core lord of the rings trilogy series, three of the many other cycles have been repacked this way. Some of the key Player cards from omitted cycles are available in starter decks tailored to particular types of heros (i.e., dwarves, elves, gondor, rohan).

The revised core box and the distribution model has generally been well received by the LOTR LCG community (8.5 rating on BGG). The revised core box resolved a range of long-time complaints with original core box: about excessive difficulty and needing to buy two core boxes to have sufficient cards or play 3 players, and the campaign mode was a welcome addition. The updated distribution model that aggregates expansions into a smaller number of boxes has also made it easier for new players to acquire them. The community is also pleased to see that the product has ongoing support. Several cycles have not been repackaged, and many in the community would like to see them repackaged and reprinted in the future, but as of 2025, FFG has not expressed any plans to do so.

On July 18, 2024, FFG announced the release of the final officially repackaged expansion. On March 16, 2026, a community manager for FFG wrote, about some of the repackaged expansions and starter decks, that they were out of stock at the US Asmodee store and that they did not intend on ordering more, adding that it was very unlikely that any other print runs would be done. These elements suggest that there will no longer be official printing of the game and that it will no longer be possible for players to obtain new copies.

== Expansions ==
When the game was originally released, there were several types of expansion to this game. Expansions were released in cycles which usually shared a mechanical or story-driven theme. They typically consisted of a deluxe expansion (with 3 quests) supplemented by 6 Adventure Packs for a total of 9 quests per cycle. Since 2021, cycle expansions have been repacked so that each cycle is divided into two products, a Hero Expansion (with player cards) and a Campaign Expansion (with quests and campaign cards).

The Saga Expansions follow the story of The Hobbit and The Lord of the Rings, with the initial time-frame for the game the 17 years between Bilbo leaving The Shire and Frodo following him. The latter introduced a mode of play called Campaign mode allowing for some degree of permanence between the quests telling the story. Players can earn powerful "Boon" cards, which can be used in the following quests, as well as "Burden" cards which make future quests more difficult.

A complete list of both the expansions both as they were originally released and in their repackaged form is available on Halls of Beorn with a separate page listing all scenarios and their user-rated difficulty levels.

Name of the expansion	Type of expansion	SKU	Release year
Khazad-dûm	Deluxe Expansion	MEC08	2011
Heirs of Numenor	Deluxe Expansion	MEC17	2012
The Voice of Isengard	Deluxe Expansion	MEC25	2014
The Lost Realm	Deluxe Expansion	MEC38	2015
The Grey Havens	Deluxe Expansion	MEC47	2015
The Sands of Harad	Deluxe Expansion	MEC55	2016
The Wilds of Rhovanion	Deluxe Expansion	MEC65	2018
A Shadow in the East	Deluxe Expansion	MEC77	2019
Angmar Awakened Hero	Hero Expansion	MEC107	2022
Angmar Awakened Campaign	Campaign Expansion	MEC108	2022
The Hobbit: Over Hill and Under Hill	Saga Expansion	MEC16	2012
The Hobbit: On the Doorstep	Saga Expansion	MEC24	2013
The Black Riders	Saga Expansion	MEC32	2013
The Road Darkens	Saga Expansion	MEC34	2014
The Treason of Saruman	Saga Expansion	MEC45	2015
The Land of Shadow	Saga Expansion	MEC46	2015
The Flame of the West	Saga Expansion	MEC54	2016
The Mountain of Fire	Saga Expansion	MEC62	2017
The Fellowship of the Ring	Saga Expansion	MEC109	2022
The Massing at Osgiliath	Standalone Scenarios	uMEC15	2011
The Battle of Lake-town	Standalone Scenarios	uMEC35	2012
The Stone of Erech	Standalone Scenarios	uMEC33	2013
Fog on the Barrow-downs	Standalone Scenarios	uMEC36	2014
The Old Forest	Standalone Scenarios	uMEC37	2014
The Ruins of Belegost	Standalone Scenarios	uMEC63	2015
Murder at the Prancing Pony	Standalone Scenarios	uMEC64	2015
The Siege of Annuminas	Standalone Scenarios	uMEC72	2016
Attack on Dol Guldur	Standalone Scenarios	uMEC74	2017
The Wizard's Quest	Standalone Scenarios	uMEC75	2018
The Woodland Realm	Standalone Scenarios	uMEC76	2018
The Mines of Moria	Standalone Scenarios	uMEC84	2020
Escape from Khazad-dûm	Standalone Scenarios	uMEC85	2020
The Hunt for the Dreadnaught	Standalone Scenarios	MEC86	2020
The Dark of Mirkwood	Standalone Scenarios	MEC102	2022

Adventure Pack Cycles continue the story of Deluxe Expansions, or, in the case of the Shadows of Mirkwood Cycle, the Base Game. Each Deluxe expansion provides encounter cards for three scenarios, and each Adventure Pack in the associated Cycle provides encounter cards for one more scenario. Both types of expansions also introduce new player cards. An Adventure pack consists of 60 fixed cards.

Adventure Pack name	Cycle	Expansion	SKU
The Hunt for Gollum	Shadows of Mirkwood	Base Game	MEC02
Conflict at the Carrock	Shadows of Mirkwood	Base Game	MEC03
A Journey to Rhosgobel	Shadows of Mirkwood	Base Game	MEC04
The Hills of Emyn Muil	Shadows of Mirkwood	Base Game	MEC05
The Dead Marshes	Shadows of Mirkwood	Base Game	MEC06
Return to Mirkwood	Shadows of Mirkwood	Base Game	MEC07
The Redhorn Gate	Dwarrowdelf	Khazad-dum	MEC09
Road to Rivendell	Dwarrowdelf	Khazad-dum	MEC10
The Watcher in the Water	Dwarrowdelf	Khazad-dum	MEC11
The Long Dark	Dwarrowdelf	Khazad-dum	MEC12
Foundations of Stone	Dwarrowdelf	Khazad-dum	MEC13
Shadow and Flame	Dwarrowdelf	Khazad-dum	MEC14
The Steward's Fear	Against the Shadow	Heirs of Numenor	MEC18
The Druadan Forest	Against the Shadow	Heirs of Numenor	MEC19
Encounter at Amon Din	Against the Shadow	Heirs of Numenor	MEC20
Assault on Osgiliath	Against the Shadow	Heirs of Numenor	MEC21
The Blood of Gondor	Against the Shadow	Heirs of Numenor	MEC22
The Morgul Vale	Against the Shadow	Heirs of Numenor	MEC23
The Dunland Trap	The Ring-maker	The Voice of Isengard	MEC26
The Three Trials	The Ring-maker	The Voice of Isengard	MEC27
Trouble in Tharbad	The Ring-maker	The Voice of Isengard	MEC28
The Nin-in-Eilph	The Ring-maker	The Voice of Isengard	MEC29
Celebrimbor's Secret	The Ring-maker	The Voice of Isengard	MEC30
The Antlered Crown	The Ring-maker	The Voice of Isengard	MEC31
The Wastes of Eriador	Angmar Awakened	The Lost Realm	MEC39
Escape from Mount Gram	Angmar Awakened	The Lost Realm	MEC40
Across the Ettenmoors	Angmar Awakened	The Lost Realm	MEC41
The Treachery of Rhudaur	Angmar Awakened	The Lost Realm	MEC42
The Battle of Carn Dûm	Angmar Awakened	The Lost Realm	MEC43
The Dread Realm	Angmar Awakened	The Lost Realm	MEC44
Flight of the Stormcaller	Dream Chaser	The Grey Havens	MEC48
The Thing in the Depths	Dream Chaser	The Grey Havens	MEC49
Temple of the Deceived	Dream Chaser	The Grey Havens	MEC50
The Drowned Ruins	Dream Chaser	The Grey Havens	MEC51
A Storm on Cobas Haven	Dream Chaser	The Grey Havens	MEC52
The City of Corsairs	Dream Chaser	The Grey Havens	MEC53
The Mûmakil	Haradrim	The Sands of Harad	MEC56
Race Across Harad	Haradrim	The Sands of Harad	MEC57
Beneath the Sands	Haradrim	The Sands of Harad	MEC58
The Black Serpent	Haradrim	The Sands of Harad	MEC59
The Dungeons of Cirith Gurat	Haradrim	The Sands of Harad	MEC60
The Crossings of Poros	Haradrim	The Sands of Harad	MEC61
The Withered Heath	Ered Mithrin	The Wilds of Rhovanion	MEC66
Roam Across Rhovanion	Ered Mithrin	The Wilds of Rhovanion	MEC67
Fire in the Night	Ered Mithrin	The Wilds of Rhovanion	MEC68
The Ghost of Framsburg	Ered Mithrin	The Wilds of Rhovanion	MEC69
Mount Gundabad	Ered Mithrin	The Wilds of Rhovanion	MEC70
The Fate of Wilderland	Ered Mithrin	The Wilds of Rhovanion	MEC71
Wrath and Ruin	Vengeance of Mordor	A Shadow in the East	MEC78
The City of Ulfast	Vengeance of Mordor	A Shadow in the East	MEC79
Challenge of the Wainriders	Vengeance of Mordor	A Shadow in the East	MEC80
Under the Ash Mountains	Vengeance of Mordor	A Shadow in the East	MEC81
The Land of Sorrow	Vengeance of Mordor	A Shadow in the East	MEC82
The Fortress of Nurn	Vengeance of Mordor	A Shadow in the East	MEC83

== Digital adaptation ==
In October 2017, Asmodee Digital and Fantasy Flight announced the formation of Fantasy Flight Interactive, a division of the merged companies to bring more of Fantasy Flight's physical board games to digital implementations. Among the games, developed by the studio was The Lord of the Rings: Adventure Card Game. Fantasy Flight Interactive released it on 28 August 2018 with the title The Lord of the Rings Living Card Game in an early access phase. It was fully released on 29 August 2019 on PC and Mac (Steam), and by the end of the year on PlayStation 4, Xbox One, and Nintendo Switch (developed by Virtuos) with cross-platform play. In December 2019 (Steam) and early 2020 (other platforms) it was upgraded under the title The Lord of the Rings: Adventure Card Game - Definitive Edition which includes all additional content as well as a new mode. However, as part of company-wide layoffs, the Fantasy Flight Interactive division was closed down in January 2020. Following the closure of Fantasy Flight Interactive, by February 2020, Asmodee announced that it was opening up its library of board games to be made into digital versions through licensing options to any developer. Since mid-2020, the game's developing was continued by Antihero Studios, who made a major update in October 2020 introducing offline play mode and new Adventure mode with free pack "The Fords of Isen" among others.

The game is not a direct adaptation but heavily inspired by the original card game. It has campaign stories, adventures, and quests that are narrated and with different paths, characters who are voiced, and dynamic reactions by the artificial intelligence of Sauron (and Saruman) in three difficulty levels (standard, advanced, and expert). It is based on player versus environment experience (PvE) intended for a solo player and online co-op. Decks are composed of 3 heroes and 30 common cards out of many heroes and different card types (allies, attachments, and events), with all the cards divided into four categories (purple "leadership", green "lore", blue "spirit", and red "tactics"), which the player can combine in deck building making various decks besides the pre-built decks with different styles of play. The cards have a cost value to play, with characters having an attack, health, and willpower number, with the latter used for completing objectives or raising the player's meter to activate bonus abilities. Sauron also has his own cards and "threat" meter which uses to activate bonus events and when full makes an automatic defeat of the player. Each round, the player and the enemy take turns playing a single action until all playable options are exhausted.

== Reception ==
Both versions were released to positive reception. The 2018 Zatu Games review gave a score of 85 out of 100 to the tabletop version, praising the quality of the thematic content, artwork, game structure, challenges that are replayable by different approaches, and player interaction, making it especially attractive to those wanting to explore the world of Middle-earth. However both with review by HCL, noted it's needed to keep in mind it has a demanding learning curve to successfully beat the game and the number of expansions. It received several nominations at the Golden Geek Awards for the best card game, thematic board game, board game artwork/presentation, and 2-player board game category. It also highly regarded as a solo game (either true solo with one deck or one person handling multiple decks) consistently ranking in the top 10 the Board Game Geek People's Choice Top 200 Solo Games awards.

The digital version on review aggregator website Metacritic has a score of 70-75 out of 100 based on few reviews published before the release of the definitive edition in December 2019. Although still not as expansive in content as the tabletop version, they praised that the game is bringing a new PvE and cooperative gameplay to the digital collectible card game industry, the art, story-telling, voice acting, and game mechanic which cards are a bit simplified in comparison to tabletop due to the format, having resemblance to Hearthstone, but none the less complexity and strategy to tabletop. Chris Carter writing for Destructoid found it "one of the most enjoyable games I've ever experienced, tabletop or otherwise" and concluded that the way Living Card Game (LCG) genre is created and developed through the game "could be a guiding light in an increasingly predatory industry. With loot box legislation around the corner ... it may launch at a perfect time".

== See also ==
- Middle-earth Collectible Card Game (out-of-print)
- The Lord of the Rings Trading Card Game (out-of-print)
