= J.R.R. Tolkien's The Lord of the Rings, Vol. I (1990 video game) =

The Lord of the Rings, Vol. I
- Cover art by Brothers Hildebrandt
- Developers: Interplay Productions; Silicon & Synapse (Amiga)
- Publisher: Interplay Productions
- Platforms: MS-DOS, Amiga, PC-98, FM Towns
- Release: 1990: MS-DOS; 1991: Amiga: JP: October 30, 1991 (PC-98); JP: March 1992 (FM-Towns)
- Genre: Role-playing
- Mode: Single-player

J.R.R. Tolkien's The Lord of the Rings, Vol. I is a role-playing video game published by Interplay Productions. It is an adaptation of The Fellowship of the Ring by J. R. R. Tolkien, being the first volume in The Lord of the Rings. The game was released in 1990 for MS-DOS, in 1991 for the Amiga and PC-98, and in 1992 for the FM Towns. It was followed by J.R.R. Tolkien's The Lord of the Rings, Vol. II: The Two Towers. It was originally designed for the Commodore 64, but the production team switched to the newer platforms. The game was designed by Troy A. Miles, Scott Bennie, Jennell Jaquays, (Note: Credited as Paul Jaquays.) and Bruce Schlickbernd. For the later versions, the cutscenes are taken from the 1978 Lord of the Rings film directed by Ralph Bakshi.

== Overview ==
The game is a role-playing game (RPG) in which the player, after an opening cinematic, takes control of Frodo Baggins just outside Bag End. From here, the player gradually "recruits" various members of the Fellowship, and while the game can be completed by following the novel for the most part, many side-quests also exist to entertain the player. The game world was quite large and featured a cast of characters from both the text and outside of it; character interaction is carried out through "questioning" other characters by typing keywords in a box. The player can swap whoever leads the "fellowship", equip other party members with a range of weapons and armour, distribute skills among the group, cast spells, and perform various skill-based actions. While following a somewhat linear plot, gameplay is quite open and players can revisit old areas and, potentially, discover new situations and characters, creating a fairly dynamic game world. The game also includes a day/night cycle, in which enemies such as the Nazgûl make more frequent appearance outside of daylight hours, and other enemies receive strength bonuses in the dark.

Departures from the book include new characters and shifts in items to create player "quests"—such as finding the pieces of Andúril scattered across the lands west of Rivendell to reforge Aragorn's sword, whereas in the book Aragorn had all fragments. The most significant change is in the climax, where Frodo and Sam are carried off by a Nazgûl to the tower of Dol Guldur, and the rest of the Fellowship must solicit the help of the Elves of Lothlórien and Radagast the Brown, a wizard, in order to infiltrate the tower and save Frodo before the Witch-king carries him away to Mordor. Strangely enough, events in Lothlórien are actually quite true to the book, including the mirror of Galadriel and a quest to find all the gifts she gives the Fellowship.

The game was packaged with an illustrated map of Eriador and a manual consisting of game mechanics, background lore and a "paragraphs" section that contains dialogue and narrative from the game. To avoid spoilers, paragraphs containing fake dialogue and events were inserted into the manual.

== Reception ==
Computer Gaming World's Charles Ardai in 1991 liked the game's characters, puzzles, graphics and soundtrack, but criticized it for not going beyond the source material and, by being the first of a trilogy, forcing players to wait after seeing one third of the story. The magazine concluded that "what it is not, is special enough to carry the Tolkien name", regretting that the author was not alive to collaborate in game design. Scorpia in 1991 cited some flaws but called the game "probably the best so far of the Tolkien adaptations" and in 1993 stated that it was "a big game [that] will not be completed quickly, no matter how well you may know your Tolkien". The game was reviewed in 1991 in Dragon #169 by Hartley, Patricia, and Kirk Lesser in "The Role of Computers" column. The reviewers gave the game 4 out of 5 stars.

Jim Trunzo reviewed The Lord of the Rings, Vol. I in White Wolf #29 (Oct./Nov., 1991), rating it a 4 out of 5 and stated that "Those unfamiliar with The Lord of the Rings will enjoy the game as a straight fantasy role playing adventure. Those who were weaned on Tolkien's work should appreciate the dedication to details that have gone into Interplay's adaptation. In either case, the game is a solid product and one worth playing."

== Legacy ==
As the game is without official support for many years, a community developer reverse-engineered the game engine and, around the year 2009, created a substitute which allowed the porting of the game itself to modern platforms, such as Windows, Linux and the OpenPandora handheld.
