= Ancient Somali city-states =

Ancient city-states of Somalia

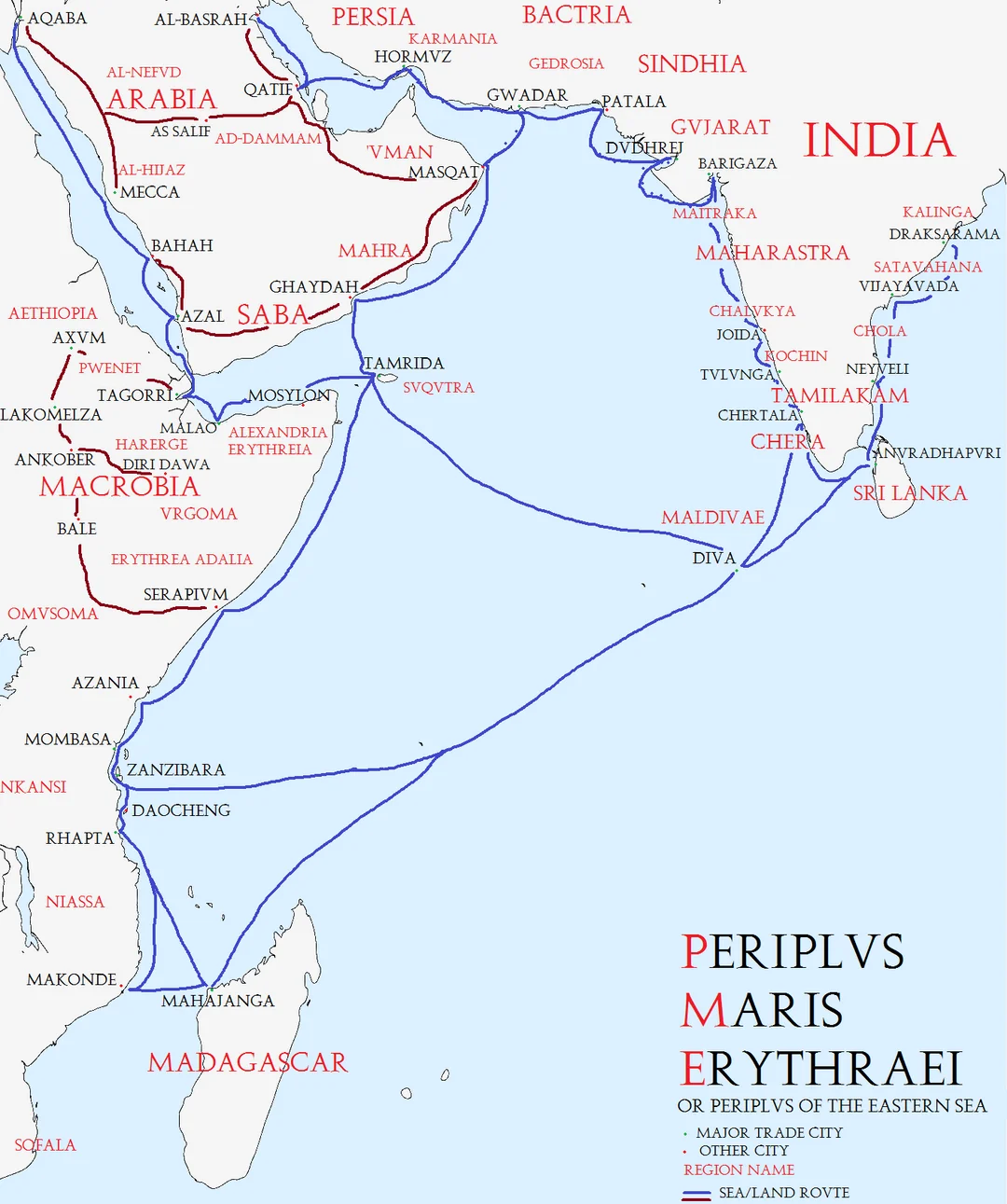
- The most prominent cities of the Indian Ocean and its environs, from the Periplus of the Erythraean Sea
- Geographical range: Greater Somalia
- Period: Classical Antiquity
- Dates: c. 300BC–600AD
- Preceded by: Macrobia
- Followed by: Barbaria Sultanate of Ifat

In antiquity, ancestors of the Somali people were an important link in the Horn of Africa connecting the region's commerce with the rest of the old world. Proto-Somali sailors and merchants were the main suppliers of frankincense, myrrh and spices, items which were considered valuable luxuries by the Ancient Egyptians, Phoenicians, Mycenaeans and Babylonians. During the classical era, several ancient Somali city-states competed with the Sabaeans, Parthians and Axumites for the wealthy Indo-Greco-Roman trade.

== History ==
The ancient Somali city-states were founded upon an indigenous network involving caravan trades going back approximately four thousand years, and is supported by archaeological and textual evidences. Opone like other city-states such as Avalites, Malao, and Mosylon came into existence with the collapse of the Macrobian kingdom, and could be regarded as successors. Ancient Greek travelers including the likes of Strabo and Cosmas Indicopleustes made visits to the Somali Peninsula between the first and fifth century CE. The Greeks referred to the Somalis as Barbar (βαρ-βαρ) and to their land as Barbaria.

After the Roman conquest of the Nabataean Empire and the Roman naval presence at Aden to curb pillaging, Somali and Gulf Arab merchants by agreement barred Indian ships from trading in the free port cities of the Arabian Peninsula to protect the interests of Somali and Arab merchants in the lucrative ancient Red Sea–Mediterranean Sea commerce. However Indian merchants continued to trade in the port cities of the Somali Peninsula, which was free from Roman interference.

For centuries, Indian merchants brought large quantities of cinnamon to Somalia and Arabia from Ceylon and the Spice Islands. The source of the cinnamon and other spices is said to have been the best-kept secret of Arab and Somali merchants in their trade with the Roman and Greek world; the Romans and Greeks believed the source to have been the Somali peninsula. The collusive agreement among Somali and Arab traders inflated the price of Indian and Chinese cinnamon in North Africa, the Near East, and Europe, and made the cinnamon trade a very profitable revenue generator, especially for the Somali merchants through whose hands large quantities were shipped across sea and land routes.

Aromata was one of the ports that lay in a line along the north Somali coast. Aromata was the sixth port after Zeyla (Aualites), Berbera (Malao), Heis (Moundou), Bandar Kasim (Mosullon) and Bandar Alula (Akannai). It is to be identified with Damo, a site protected on the south but exposed on the north.

In ancient times, Somalia was known to the Chinese as the "Country of Pi-p'a-lo", which had four port cities each trying to gain the supremacy over the other. It had twenty thousand troops between them, who wore cuirasses, a protective body armor.

== Trade and governance ==
An ancient document called the Periplus of the Erythraean Sea describes the political system of the city states as being decentralised and lacking a strong centralised government with each port city administered by a tyrannical chief. The vast majority of the settlements were found inshore, each port city had its own unmistakable character, some were unwelcoming to the Romans, others welcoming depending on the conditions and perspectives of the locals. Port cities such as Avalites were described as unruly, whereas other port cities like Malao, the natives were more peaceful. During this period, ruler of Saba and Himyar Charibael is said to have extended his influence further down the east African coast in Sarapion and Azania. By the 2nd century, forces from Himyar invaded Avalites and put the town under siege from which it would not recover until the advent of Islam centuries later.

A ship called the Beden was the principal vessel for traders from the different city-states. It was a fast, durable, double masted ship. The Beden was used as the main trading vessel. The boat was used mainly because of its speed.

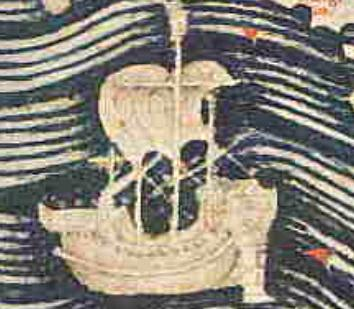
Somali Beden ship from Fra Mauro's map.

The ports of Mosylon, Mundus, Opone, Malao, Avalites and Sarapion, were trading in items such as spices, frankincense, myrrh and cassia. The cities would engage in lucrative trade networks connecting Somali merchants with Phoenicia, Tabae, Ptolemic Egypt, Greece, Parthian Persia, Saba, Nabataea and the Roman Empire. Somali sailors used the ancient Somali maritime vessel Beden to transport their goods.

The Somali coast formed a section of the greater incense trade alongside South Asia and Southern Arabia on the Red Sea. Incense was a sought out product in the Mediterranean region where it would be consistently used during strict religious gatherings, and for other everyday uses, which made incense a noteworthy commodity in the Indian Ocean trade.

== List of city states ==
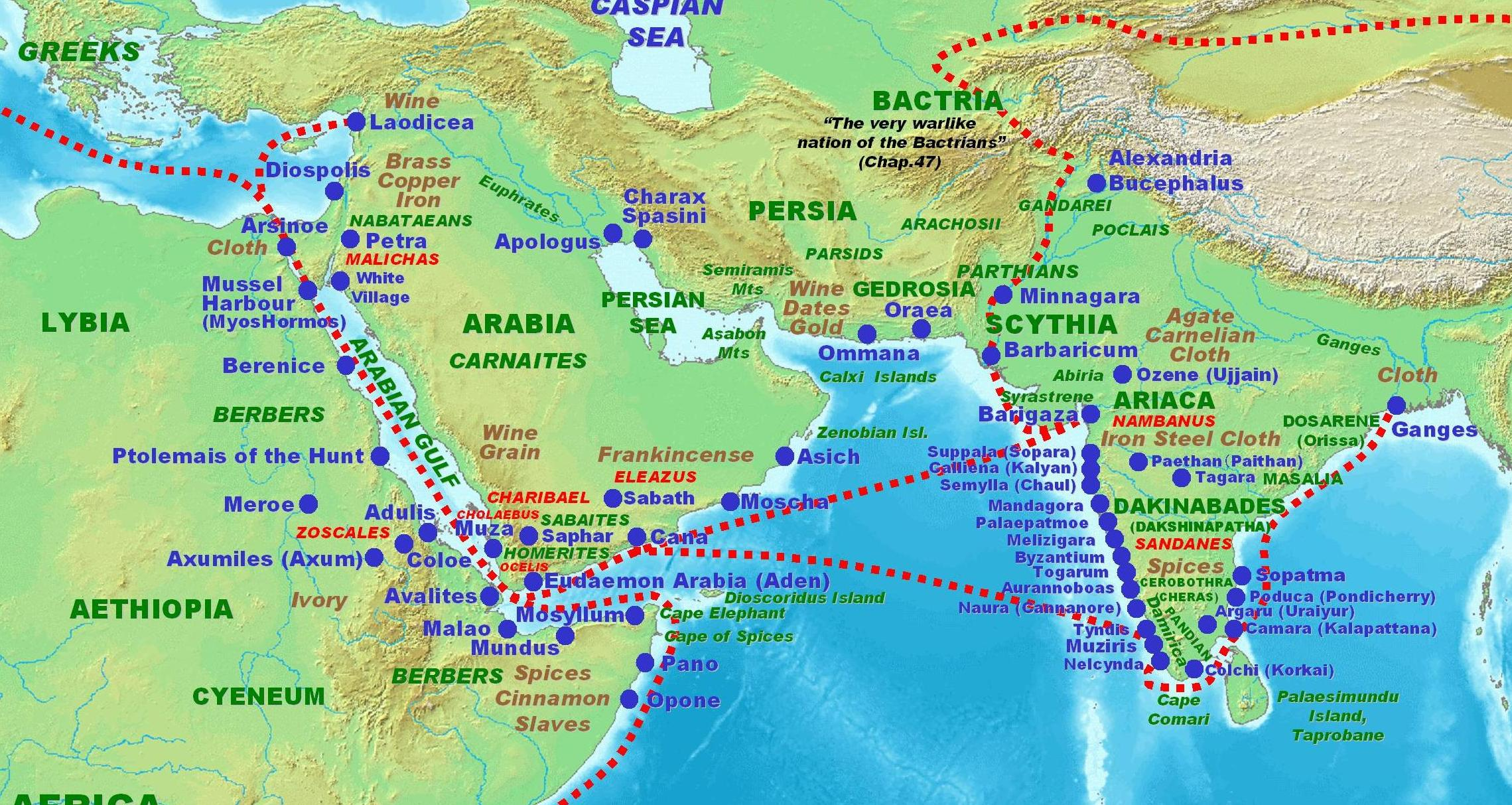
The most prominent cities of the Old World from the Periplus of the Erythraean Sea.

- Aromata – Known in ancient times as the Cape of Spices, it was an important place for the ancient cinnamon and Indian spice trade. Its modern geographical location is Damo, located 5 km west of Cape Guardafui.
- Avalites – An ancient port city in present-day Somalia. It corresponds with what later became the city of Zeila.
- Botiala – In ancient times, the port city of Botiala transported goods such as aromatic woods, gum and incense to Indian, Persian and Arab merchants.
- Bulhar – Known today as Bandar Kor, it is located in a valley to the east of the ancient port city of Qandala, between Cape Guardafui and Bosaso. The area until today is abundant in frankincense of the highest quality.
- Damo – Ancient port town in northern Somalia. It likely corresponded with the Periplus "Market of Spices". Holds many historical artifacts and structures, including ancient coins, Roman pottery, drystone buildings, cairns, mosques, walled enclosures, standing stones and platform monuments.
- Essina – Ancient emporium possibly located between the southern ports of Barawa and Merca, based on Ptolemy's work.
- Gondal – Ancient town in southern Somalia. It is considered a predecessor of the port city Kismayo.
- Hannassa – Located north of Ras Kamboni.
- Macajilayn – Situated to the east of the old coastal town of Heis, in Sanaag, Somalia.
- Malao – Ancient port city known for its commerce in frankincense and myrrh in exchange for cloaks, copper and gold from Arsinoe and India.
- Miandi – situated in the southernmost part of the country, at a radius of one to two miles from Ras Ooddo (Ras Cuaodo).
- Mosylon – The most important ancient port city of the Somali Peninsula, it handled a considerable amount of the Indian Ocean trade through its large ships and extensive harbor.
- Mundus – Ancient port engaged in the fragrant gum and cinnamon trade with the Hellenic world.
- Nikon – ancient coastal emporium in the Horn of Africa. It was situated in the vicinity of Port Dunford in the southern Jubaland.
- Opone – In ancient times, the port city of Opone traded with merchants from Phoenicia, Egypt, Greece, Persia and the Roman Empire, and connected with traders from as far afield as Indonesia and Malaysia, exchanging spices, silks and other goods.
- Sarapion – Ancient port city in Somalia. It is the possible predecessor of Mogadishu.
- Salweyn
- Tabae – Ancient port where sailors on their way to India could take refuge from the storms of the Indian Ocean.
- Toniki – Toniki is believed to have been situated in the vicinity of Makasi in the present-day Barawa District. It was one of a series of ancient commercial ports along the coast of Somalia, which were described in the 1st century CE Greco-Roman travelogue the Periplus of the Erythraean Sea, as well as in Ptolemy's Geographia.

== Sources ==
- Warmington, Eric Herbert (1995). The Commerce Between the Roman Empire and India. South Asia Books. ISBN 81-215-0670-0.
