= Hobyo =

Port city in Galmudug, Somalia

Hobyo هوبيو
- city
- Location in Somalia
- Coordinates: 5°21′05″N 48°31′32″E
- Country: Somalia
- Regional State: Galmudug
- Region: Mudug
- District: Hobyo

Government
  - Type: District Council
  - Mayor (Gudoomiye): Abdulahi Ali Fatax

Population
  - Total: 11,800
- Time zone: UTC+3 (EAT)

Hobyo (Arabic: هوبيو; Somali: Hobyo) is an ancient port city in Galmudug state in the north-central Mudug region of Somalia.

Hobyo was founded as a coastal outpost by the Ajuran Empire during the 13th century. In the late 17th century the Hiraab successfully revolted against the Ajuran Sultanate who had been ruling Hobyo since the 13th century and established an independent Hiraab Imamate. According to Bernhard Helander of Uppsala University, "the Imam of Hawiye is a hereditary position that traditionally is held by a person of the first-born branch."

== History ==
=== Ajuuran Empire and Hiraab Imamate period ===
Along with Mareeg, Hobyo developed as a coastal outpost by the Ajuran Empire during the 13th century.

However, in the late 17th century the Hiraab successfully revolted against the Ajuran Sultanate and established an independent Hiraab Imamate According to Bernhard Helander of Uppsala University, "the Imam of Hiraab is a hereditary position that traditionally is held by a person of the first-born branch."

Lee Cassanelli in his book The Shaping of Somali society provides a historical picture of the Hiraab Imamate. He writes:

"According to local oral tradition, the Hiraab imamate was a powerful alliance of closely related groups who shared a common lineage under the Gorgaarte clan divisions. It successfully revolted against the Ajuran Sultanate and established an independent rule for at least two centuries from the seventeen hundreds and onwards.

The alliance involved the army leaders and advisors of the Habar Gidir and Duduble, a Fiqhi/Qadi of Sheekhaal, and the Imam was reserved for the Mudulood branch who is believed to have been the first born. Once established, the Imamate ruled the territories from the Shabeelle valley, the Benaadir provinces, the Mareeg areas all the way to the arid lands of Mudug.

The agricultural centres of Eldher and Harardhere included the production of sorghum and beans, supplementing with herds of camels, cattle, goats and sheep. Livestock, hides and skin, whilst the aromatic woods and raisins were the primary exports as rice, other foodstuffs and clothes were imported. Merchants looking for exotic goods came to Hobyo to buy textiles, precious metals and pearls. The commercial goods harvested along the Shabelle river were brought to Hobyo for trade. Also, the increasing importance and rapid settlement of more southerly cities such as Mogadishu further boosted the prosperity of Hobyo, as more and more ships made their way down the Somali coast and stopped in Hobyo to trade and replenish their supplies.

=== Sultanate of Hobyo ===
By the late 19th century, the Imamate began to decline. At the start of Colonialism in Somalia in 1884, shortly after the Berlin Conference, a young ambitious rebel called Sultan Kenadiid of the Majeerteen, managed to conquer Hobyo and established The Kingdom of Hobyo in 1884.

From 1900 to 1910, Hobyo was ruled by Yusuf Ali Kenadid who established the Sultanate of Hobyo in 1884. As with the Majeerteen Sultanate, the Sultanate of Hobyo exerted a strong centralized authority during its existence, and possessed all of the organs and trappings of an integrated modern state: a functioning bureaucracy, a hereditary nobility, titled aristocrats, a state flag, as well as a professional army. Both sultanates also maintained written records of their activities, which still exist.

Initially, Ali Yusuf Kenadid's goal was to seize control of the neighboring Majeerteen Sultanate, which was then ruled by his cousin Boqor Osman Mahamud. However, he was unsuccessful in this endeavor, and was eventually forced into exile in Yemen. A decade later, in the 1880s, Kenadid returned from the Arabian Peninsula on a British ship with a band of Hadhrami musketeers and a group of devoted lieutenants. With their assistance, he managed to establish a sultanate in 1884.

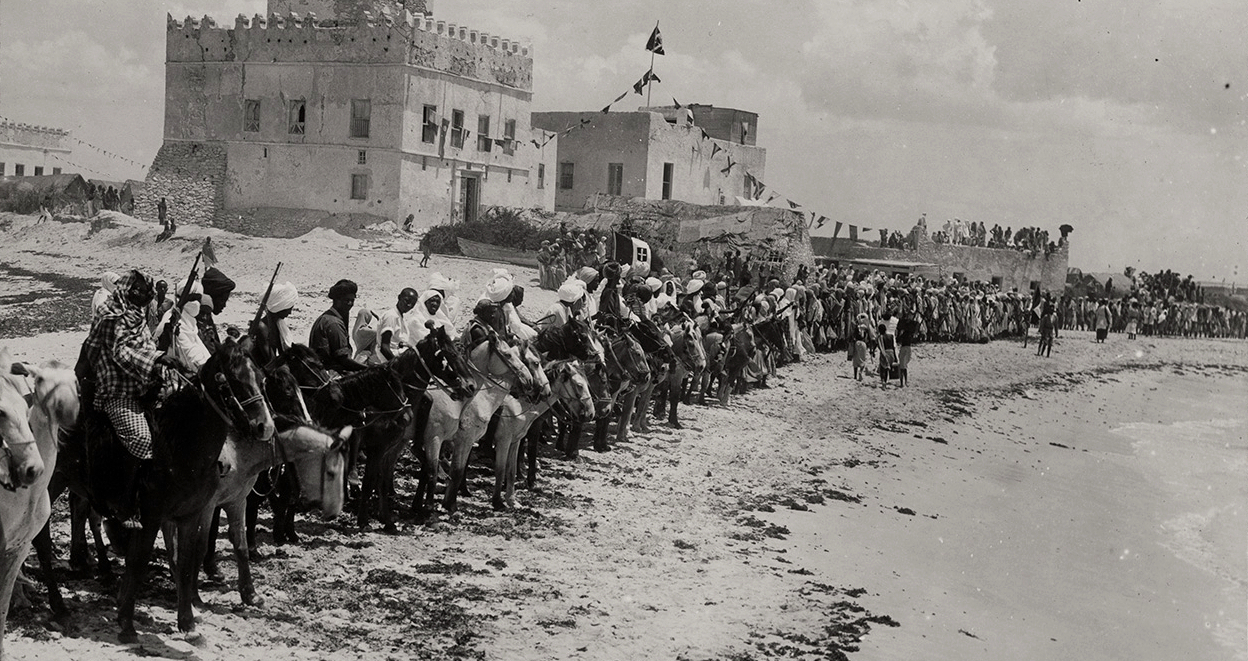
Hobyo Sultanate cavalry and fort, 1924. The flags of Italy reflect the 1889 protectorate agreement established between Sultan Yusuf Ali Kenadid and the Kingdom of Italy.

In the late 19th century, all extant Somali monarchs entered into treaties with one of the colonial powers, Abyssinia, Britain or Italy except the Dhulbahante. Likewise, in late 1888, Sultan Kenadid entered into a treaty with the Italians, making his realm an Italian protectorate. His rival Boqor Osman would sign a similar agreement vis-a-vis his own Sultanate the following year. Both rulers had signed the protectorate treaties to advance their own expansionist objectives. In signing the agreements, the rulers also hoped to exploit the rival objectives of the European imperial powers so as to more effectively assure the continued independence of their territories.

However, the relationship between Hobyo and Italy soured when Sultan Kenadid refused the Italians' proposal to allow a British contingent of troops to disembark in his Sultanate so that they might then pursue their battle against the Dervish forces. Viewed as too much of a threat by the Italians, Sultan Kenadid was eventually exiled to Aden in Yemen and then to Eritrea, as was his son Ali Yusuf, the heir apparent to his throne. However, unlike the southern territories, the northern sultanates were not subject to direct rule due to the earlier treaties they had signed with the Italians.

== Climate ==
Hobyo has a hot arid climate (Köppen BWh).

Climate data for Hobyo
Month	Jan	Feb	Mar	Apr	May	Jun	Jul	Aug	Sep	Oct	Nov	Dec	Year
Mean daily maximum °C (°F)	29.7 (85.5)	30.6 (87.1)	32.0 (89.6)	33.6 (92.5)	31.8 (89.2)	29.9 (85.8)	28.9 (84.0)	28.7 (83.7)	29.2 (84.6)	30.2 (86.4)	31.4 (88.5)	30.4 (86.7)	30.5 (87.0)
Mean daily minimum °C (°F)	22.1 (71.8)	22.8 (73.0)	23.8 (74.8)	24.6 (76.3)	24.1 (75.4)	22.7 (72.9)	21.7 (71.1)	21.8 (71.2)	22.2 (72.0)	23.1 (73.6)	23.1 (73.6)	22.6 (72.7)	22.9 (73.2)
Average rainfall mm (inches)	4 (0.2)	1 (0.0)	8 (0.3)	15 (0.6)	53 (2.1)	6 (0.2)	0 (0)	0 (0)	0 (0)	34 (1.3)	39 (1.5)	20 (0.8)	180 (7)
Source: Climate-Data.org, altitude: 3 metres or 10 feet

== Demographics ==
Hobyo has a population of around 11,800 inhabitants. The broader Hobyo District has a total population of 67,249 residents.

== Transportation ==
Hobyo has a seaport which serves the town.

For air transportation, the city is served by the Obbia Airport.

In August 2019, Qatar initiated a project to build the port of Hobyo as part of the development agreements signed between Somalia and Qatar in December 2018.

== See also ==
- Piracy off the coast of Somalia
- Essina
- Nikon
- Damo, Somalia
- Gondershe
- Sarapion
- Opone
- Malao
- Mosylon

== Bibliography ==
- Issa-Salwe, Abdisalam M. (1996). The Collapse of the Somali State: The Impact of the Colonial Legacy. London: Haan Associates. ISBN 187420991X.
- Sheik-ʻAbdi, ʻAbdi ʻAbdulqadir (1993). Divine madness: Moḥammed ʻAbdulle Ḥassan (1856-1920). Zed Books. ISBN 0-86232-444-0.
