= Ras Bar Balla =

Archaeological site in Somalia

- Town
- Location in Somalia
- Coordinates: 1.4628007°S 41.6970316°E
- Country: Somalia
- Region: Lower Juba
- Time zone: UTC+3 (EAT)

Ras Bar Balla (Somali: Raas Bar Balla) is a historic town in the southern Lower Juba region of Somalia.

== Overview ==
An ancient area of occupation, Ras Bar Balla is situated on a small promontory. The settlement contains two tombs: one decorated with rectangular panels, the other plain in design. Today, it is mainly used as a resting place for Somali herders and their flock. It is believed to date back to the powerful Ajuran Empire.

== See also ==
- Damo
- Essina
- Gondershe
- Hannassa
- Malao
- Mosylon
- Opone
- Ras Hafun
- Sarapion
- Somali maritime history
