= Proto-Somali =

Ancestors of present-day Somalis

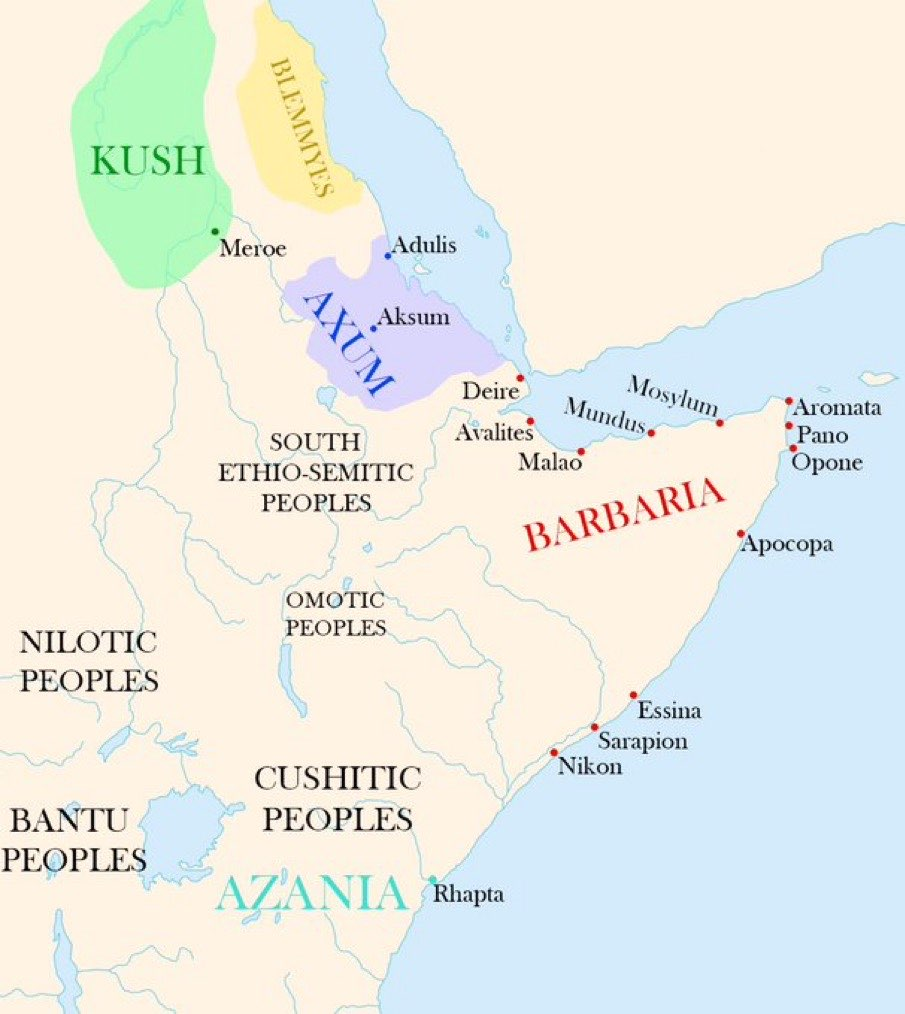
The Somalia region, from the Periplus of the Erythraean Sea (1st century AD)

Proto-Somalis were the ancient people and ancestors of Somalis who lived in present-day Somalia. Literature on proto-Somalis largely uses a time-frame pertaining to the 1st millennium BC and 1st millennium AD.

== History ==
The Puntites were ancient Cushites who are believed to have traded myrrh, spices, gold, ebony, short-horned cattle, ivory, and frankincense with neighbouring Ancient Egypt and with ancient Mesopotamia through their commercial ports. An Ancient Egyptian expedition sent to Punt by the 18th dynasty Queen Hatshepsut is recorded on the temple reliefs at Deir el-Bahari, during the reign of the Puntite King Parahu and Queen Ati.

In the classical era, the Macrobians, who have been ancestral to the Automoli or ancient Somalis, established a powerful tribal kingdom that ruled large parts of modern Somalia. They were reputed for their longevity and wealth and were said to be the "tallest and handsomest of all men." The Macrobians were warrior herders and seafarers. According to Herodotus' account, the Persian Emperor Cambyses II, upon his conquest of Egypt (525 BC), sent ambassadors to Macrobia, bringing luxury gifts for the Macrobian king to entice his submission. The Macrobian ruler, who was elected based on his stature and beauty, replied instead with a challenge for his Persian counterpart in the form of an unstrung bow: if the Persians could manage to draw it, they would have the right to invade his country; but until then, they should thank the gods that the Macrobians never decided to invade their empire. The Macrobians were a regional power reputed for their advanced architecture and gold wealth, which was so plentiful that they shackled their prisoners in golden chains. The Harla is an extinct people credited for building various monuments in the Horn Africa are possible candidates of Proto-Somali.

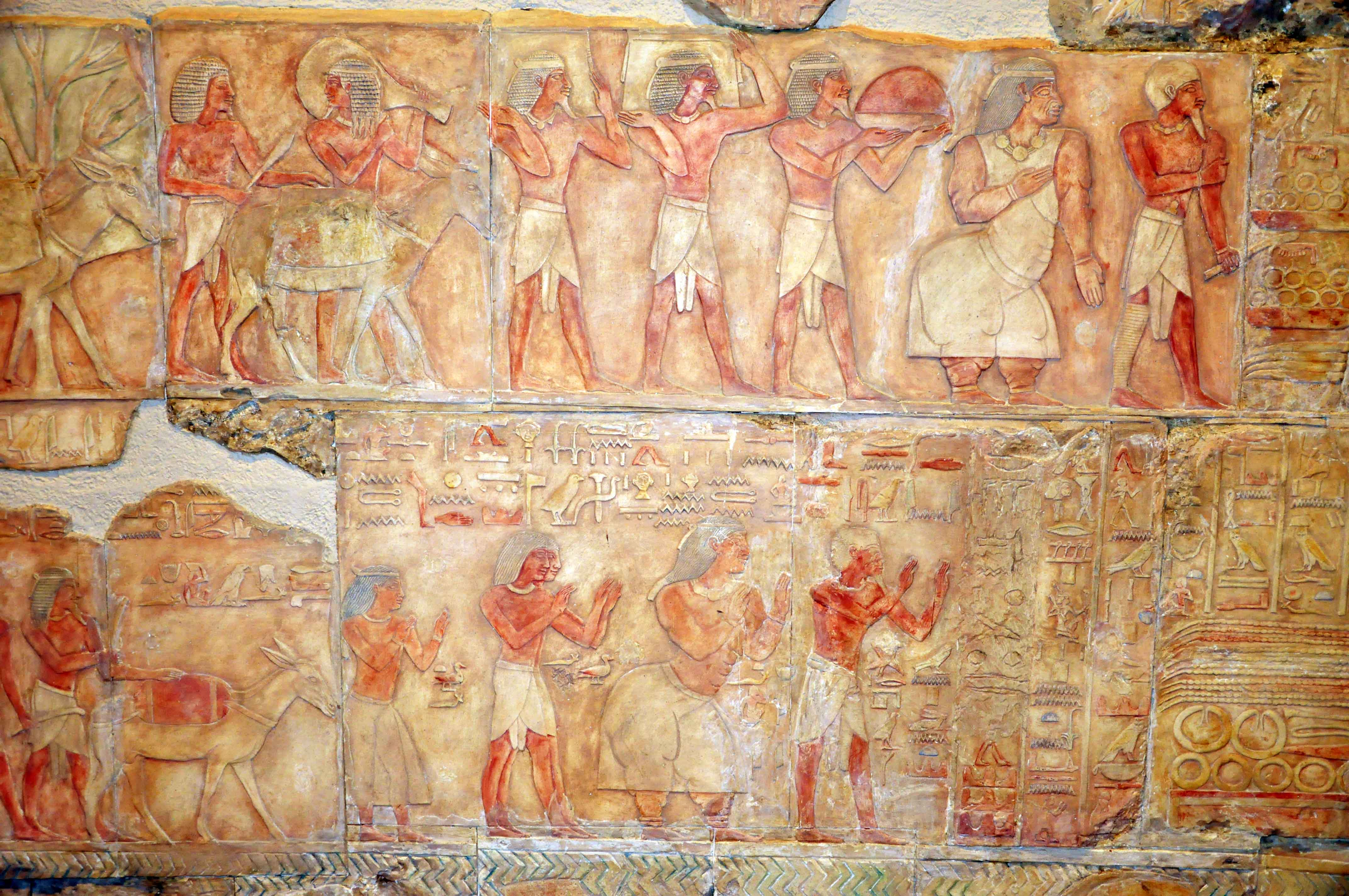
King Parahu and Queen Ati of Punt receiving the Egyptian delegation. Modern scholars widely associate Punt with the Horn of Africa, considering its ancient Cushitic inhabitants ancestral to modern Somalis.

After the collapse of Macrobia, several proto-Somali ancient wealthy city-states emerged, such as Malao, Mundus, Mosylon and, Opone, which competed with the Sabaeans, Parthians, and Axumites for the wealthy Indo-Greco-Roman trade also flourished in Somalia. Somali sailors and merchants were the main suppliers of gold, silver, gemstones, frankincense, myrrh, acacia gum, salt, livestock, ivory, feathers, hide (skin), and spices, items that were considered valuable luxuries.

Other notable proto-Somali city-states included Avalite, Bulhar, Botiala, Essina, Damo, Hannassa, Sarapion, Nikon, Toniki, Gondal, Macajilayn, Salweyn, and Miandi. Ancient Greek travelers including the likes of Strabo and Cosmas Indicopleustes made visits to the Somali peninsula between the 1st and 5th century. The Greeks referred to Somalis as the Barbaria and their land as Barbars.

== Genetics ==
In Somalis, the Time to Most Recent Common Ancestor (TMRCA) was estimated to be 4000–5000 years (2,500 BCE) for the haplogroup E-M78 cluster γ and 2100–2200 years (150 BCE) for Somali T-M184 bearers.

Deep subclade E-Y18629 is commonly found in Somalis and has a formation date of 3,600 YBP (years before present) and a TMRCA of 2,600 YBP.

== States ==
There were many examples of proto-Somali states. Some of these include:

- Ajan Coast
- Aromata
- Macrobians
- Land of Punt
