= Barbaria (region) =

Ancient region

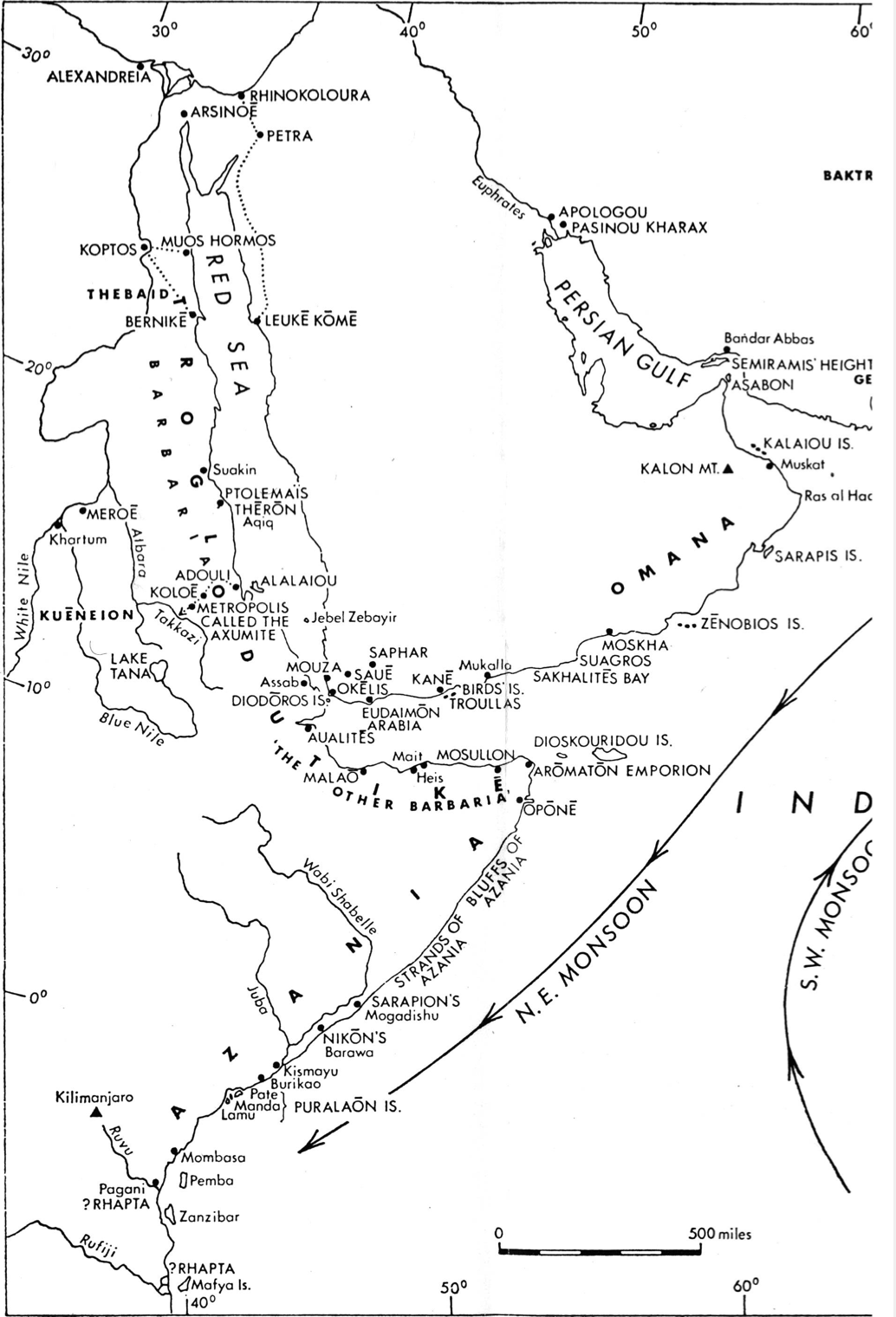
- The most prominent cities of the Indian Ocean and its environs, from the Periplus of the Erythraean Sea
- Geographical range: Greater Somalia
- Period: Classical Antiquity
- Dates: c. 300BC–600AD
- Preceded by: Ancient Somali city-states

Barbaria corresponding Arabic term, bilad al-Barbar (land of the Barbar) was a term applied to the Somali peninsula. The name of Barbaria is preserved today in the name of the Somaliland port city of Berbera, the city known to the Greeks as Malao.

== Etymology ==
Sabaean inscriptions as well as Arabic sources refer to the coast as the Baḥr Berberā or al-Khalīj al-Berberī and its inhabitants as the Berbera or Berābir. They are the Somalis, distinguished from the Habash to their north and the Zanj to their south. From Arabic, this terminology for northeast Africa entered Hebrew (Barbara), Persian (Barbaristan) and even Chinese (Pi-pa-li). Most of these usages are associated with Somalia. The Chinese term, although probably derived from Berbera, refers to the coast and hinterland and not just the port.

== Geography ==
According to the Periplus of the Erythraean Sea, a 1st-century travelogue written by a Greek merchant based in Alexandria, Barbaria extended from the border of Egypt just south of Berenice Troglodytica to just north of Ptolemais Theron. From there to the Bab-el-Mandeb was the kingdom ruled by Zoskales (possibly Aksum), after which the "rest of Barbaria" extended to Opone. This second Barbaria was the location of the so-called "far-side" ports.

In the Geography of Ptolemy (2nd century), Barbaria is said to extend even further, as far south as Zanzibar, although the land south of Opone is called Azania in the Periplus. Ptolemy describes the city of Rhapta as the "metropolis of Barbaria". Barbaria is also mentioned in Marcian of Heraclea. Later sources (Cosmas Indicopleustes and Stephanus of Byzantium) place it on the African side of the Arabian Sea.

== History ==
The first contact of the Greeks with Barbaria came in the 3rd century BC, when the Ptolemies set up bases for elephant hunting. These bases remained in use as ports for the export of myrrh and frankincense throughout antiquity. There were many smaller ports that exported tortoiseshell and ivory. In the Periplus, Barbaria is said to lack a central government and is ruled by local chiefs.

In the historical work known as the Book of Tang, an extensive chronicle compiled during the Tang dynasty, a region of Barbaria is described in great detail. This area, specifically the Berbera coast, is referred to as Pi-p'a-lo (皮波羅). The text provides valuable insights into the geography, culture, economy, and unique fauna of this part of the world.

Below is an excerpt from the Book of Tang, offering a glimpse into life in Pi-p'a-lo:

The country of Pi-p'a-lo contains four cities (州); the other (places) are all villages which are (constantly) at feud and fighting with each other.

The inhabitants pray to Heaven and not to the Buddha.

The land produces many camels and sheep, and the people feed themselves with the flesh and milk of camels and with baked cakes (燒餅).

The (other) products are ambergris, big elephants' tusks and big rhinoceros horns. There are elephants' tusks which weigh over one hundred catties, and rhinoceros horns of over ten catties weight.

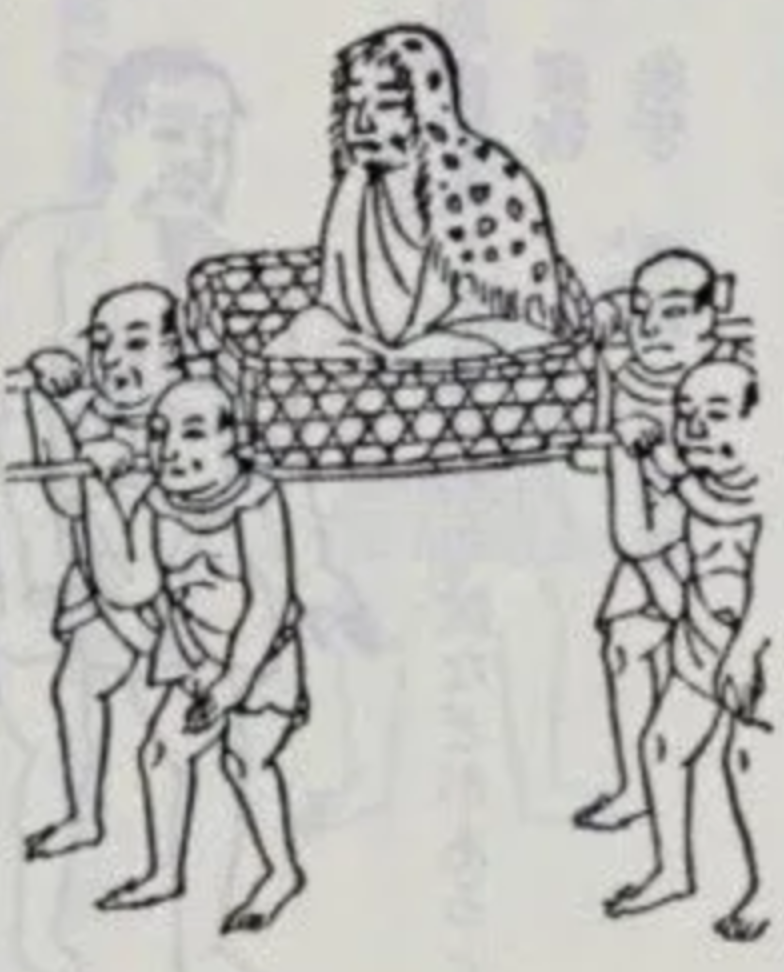
A Japanese illustration of Barbaria in the Wakan Sansai Zue

The land is also rich in putchuck, liquid storax gum, myrrh, and tortoise shell of extraordinary thickness, for which there is a great demand in other countries.

The country brings forth also the (so-called) "camel-crane" (馬它鶴), which measures from the ground to its crown from six to seven feet. It has wings and can fly, but not to any great height.

There is also (in this country) a wild animal called isii-la (但蝶); it resembles a camel in shape, an ox in size, and is of a yellow color. Its fore legs are five feet long, its hind legs only three feet. Its head is high up and turned upwards. Its skin is an inch thick.

There is also (in this country) a kind of mule with brown, white and black stripes around its body. These animals wander about the mountain wilds; they are a variety of the camel (膝馬它之別種也). The inhabitants of this country, who are great huntsmen, hunt these animals with poisoned arrows.

The Book of Tang also provides a detailed account of Chung-Li, another region in Barbaria. This account offers a fascinating look into the customs, lifestyle, and unique phenomena of the area. Below is an excerpt describing Chung-Li:

The inhabitants of the Chung-li country (中理國) go bareheaded and barefooted, they wrap themselves (纏) in cotton stuffs (布), but they dare not wear jackets (衫), for the wearing of jackets (衫) and turbans (纏頭) is a privilege reserved to the ministers and the king's courtiers. The king lives in a brick house covered with glazed tiles, but the people live in huts made of palm leaves and covered with grass thatched roofs. Their daily food consists of baked flour cakes, sheep's and camel's milk. There are great numbers of cattle, sheep, and camels.

Among the countries of the Ta-shii, this is the only one which produces frankincense.

There are many sorcerers among them who are able to change themselves into birds, beasts, or aquatic animals, and by these means keep the ignorant people in a state of terror. If some of them, in trading with some foreign ship, have a quarrel, the sorcerers pronounce a charm over the ship, so that it can neither go forward nor backward, and they only release the ship when it has settled the dispute. The government has formally forbidden this practice.

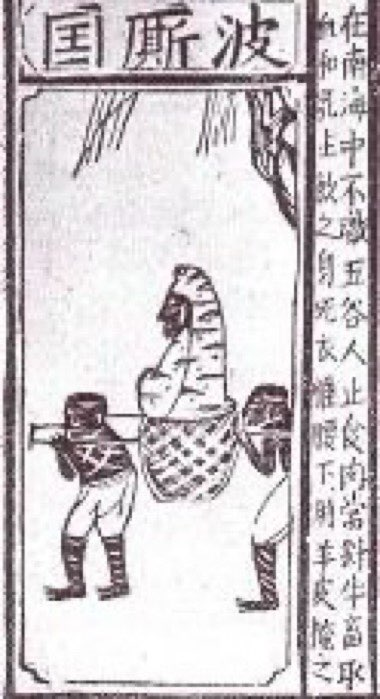
Ming depiction of Barbaria from the Sancai Tuhui

Every year countless numbers of birds of passage (飛 禽) alight in the desert parts of this country. When the sun rises, they suddenly disappear, so that one cannot find a trace of them. The people catch them with nets, and eat them; they are remarkably savory. They are in season till the end of spring, but, as soon as summer comes, they disappear, to come back the following year.

When one of the inhabitants dies, and they are about to bury him in his coffin, his kinsfolk from near and far come to condole. Each person, flourishing a sword in his hand, goes in and asks the mourners the cause of the person's death. "If he was killed by the hand of man," each one says, "we will revenge him on the murderer with these swords." Should the mourners reply that he was not killed by anyone, but that he came to his end by the will of Heaven, they throw away their swords and break into violent wailing. Every year there are driven on the coast a great many dead fish measuring two hundred feet in length and twenty feet through the body. The people do not eat the flesh of these fish, but they cut out their brains, marrow, and eyes, from which they get oil, often as much as three hundred odd tong (from a single fish). They mix this oil with lime to caulk their boats and use it also in lamps. The poor people use the ribs of these fish to make rafters, the backbones for door leaves, and they cut off vertebrae to make mortars with.

There is a mountain (or island, 山) in this country which forms the boundary of Pi-p'a-lo. It is four thousand li around it — for the most part uninhabited. Dragon's-blood is procured from this mountain, also aloes (廣蒼), and from the waters (around it) tortoise-shell and ambergris.

It is not known whence ambergris comes; it suddenly appears in lumps of from three to five or ten catties in weight, driven on the shore by the wind. The people of the country make haste to divide it up, or ships run across it at sea and fish it up.

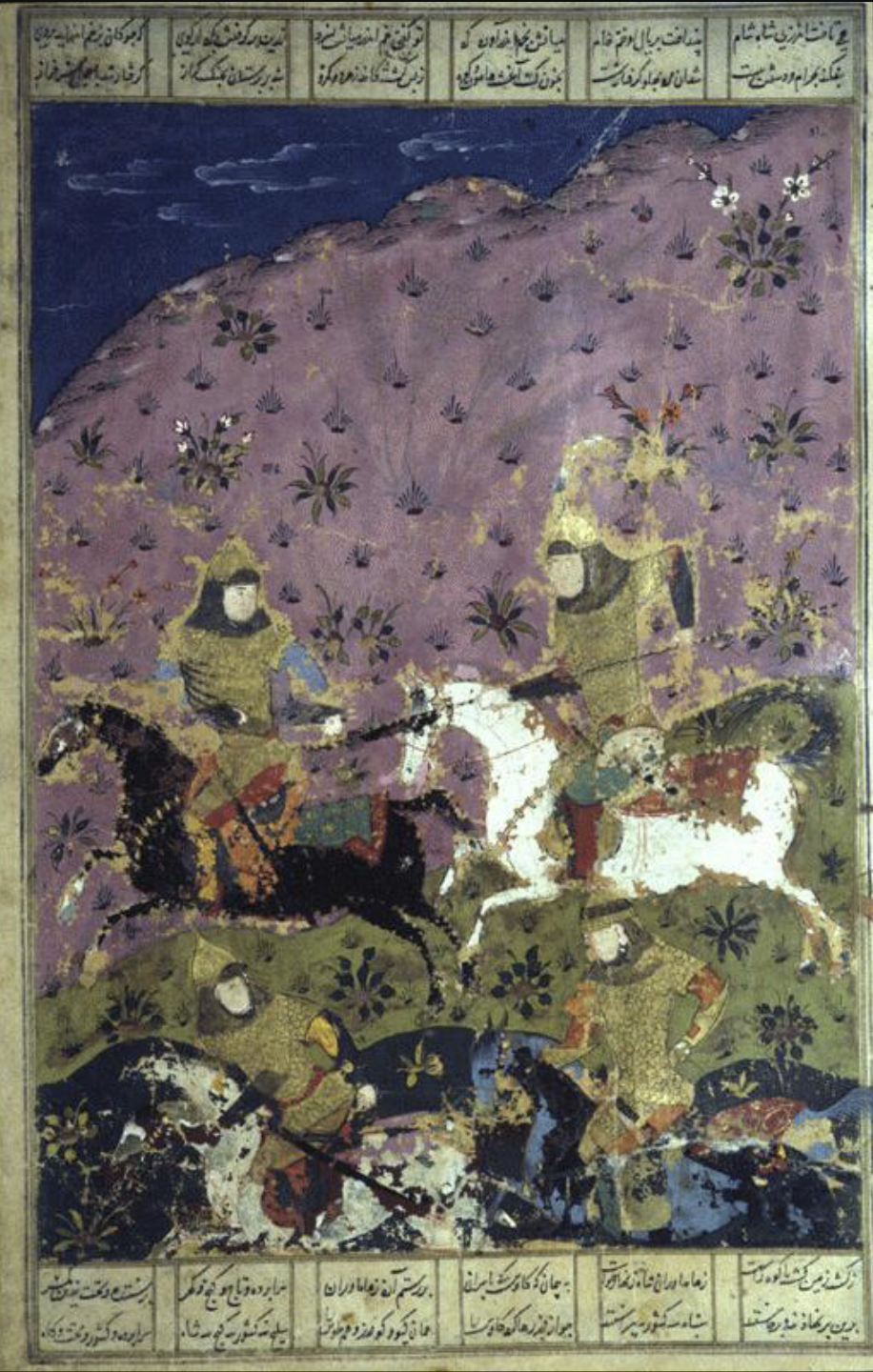
Guraza captures and subdues the ruler of Barbaria during battle

In the 6th-century Sassanid text, the Letter of Tansar, the third part of the world is designated the “Land of the Blacks” which stretches from Barbaria to India. Barbaria in this context alludes to the city of Berbera. The Persian Firdawsi in his epic, the Shahnama, refers to 'Barbaristan', which according to J. Darmester corresponds with modern-day Somalia.

=== Barbaria and Axum ===
In the Himyarite-Axumite war of 270-272 defeated Axumites fled torwards the Barbarian sea.

According to the Martyrium of Arethas, King Ella Asbeha dispatched a force of 15,000 soldiers by land to Bypass the Himyarite rebels. The text describes these troops as "Ethiopian barbarians" and states that they were ordered to march through Somaliland before crossing the sea to Yemen, where they would attack the rebels from the east. the Greek Martyrium of the Negranites is unclear whether the contingent from Barbaria perished in Arabia or Barbaria, stating only that "the Barbarians neither reached the land of the Homerites nor returned to Ethiopia". G. W. Bowersock states that a contingent from Barbaria, on the Somali coast, "perished on the way to the launching of the expedition." However According to the 10th-century historian al-Masʿūdī, the Abyssinian coast, including the ports of Zaylaʿ , Dahlak, and Nāṣiʿ, was the site of the sea crossing from which the Abyssinians crossed to Yemen. The voyage took approximately three days, after which they took possession of Yemen.

kingdom of Axum fought and used the Barbaroi of the Horn of Africa as troops in their wars. With the participation of a contingent from Barbaria in the Aksumite expedition to Himyar in a.d. 525 , the nomadic Barbar were well established with regional states and involved in their political struggles.

People from Barbaria are said to have fought alongside the Axumites, as recorded by various Arab historians. Historian Ibn Hishām preserves a verse attributed to ʿAdī ibn Zayd al-Ḥimyarī, which describes the end of Aksumite rule in Yemen and includes a reference to Barbar alongside Yaksūm (Aksum). In his Sīra, Ibn Hishām transmits a poem attributed to ʿAdī ibn Zayd describing the fall of the Aksumite kingdom following the Persian invasion. The poem includes the line: “On the day they call upon Āl Barbar and al-Yaksūm (Aksum), none of its fugitives shall escape.” the poem was made in reference to the joint axumite barbar retreat from Siege of Sanaa (570).

Andalusi scholar al-Suhaylī, in his commentary on Ibn Hishām's Sīra, discusses ʿAdī ibn Zayd's poem on the Persian defeat of the Aksumites in Yemen. He explains that the verse mentioning "the Clan of Barbar and the Yaksūm (Aksum)" links the Barbar and the Habasha through traditional genealogy, stating that "the Barbar and the Abyssinians (Habasha) are from the descendants of Ham".The poem of adi Ibn Zayd refers to inhabitants in the east coast of Africa known as barbar.

== Legends ==
In the Shahnama of Firdausi, soldiers from Barbaristan march upon the orders of their king, coordinating with Himavarin. Their forces capture renowned Persian warriors such as Giv, Gidarz, and Tus. Ka'us, the epic's protagonist, responds by rallying his forces, leading them towards Barbaristan. The encounter is fierce, with Barbaristan's forces ultimately becoming overwhelmed. The elders of Barbaristan, recognizing their defeat, seek peace and offer tribute to Ka'us, who accepts and imposes new laws.

Later, the combined forces of Barbaristan and Himavarin, consisting of over two hundred elephants and a two-mile-long battle line, clash with the Persians. Rustam captures and subdues key figures, including the king of Himavarin, significantly weakening the coalition. Guraza, a key Sassanid figure, captures the monarch of Barbaristan and forty chiefs.

The great Shah unlocks his treasury to celebrate his victory. He distributes lavish gifts, including jewels, crowns, finger-rings, brocade, and slaves adorned with earrings and crowns. Among these gifts were items from Barbar, which included a hundred steeds. Hosts from Barbaristan and Rúm, led by Kishwaristin join the Shah's left wing, contributing thirty thousand strong in horse and foot to the left wing. Afterwards, the Caesar selects twelve thousand efficient martial cavaliers from the men of Rūm, Misr, and Barbaristan.

== See also ==
- Barabra
- Barbarian
- Land of Punt
- Kingdom of Kush
- Macrobia
- Aromata
