= Toniki =

- Town
- Country: Somalia
- Region: Lower Shabelle
- District: Barawa
- Time zone: UTC+3 (EAT)

Toniki (Ancient Greek: Τωνική) was an ancient proto-Somali market town on the coast of the southeastern Lower Shabelle province of Somalia.

== Overview ==
Toniki is believed to have been situated in the vicinity of Makasi in the present-day Barawa District.

It was one of a series of ancient commercial ports along the coast of Somalia, which were described in the 1st century CE Greco-Roman travelogue the Periplus of the Erythraean Sea, as well as in Ptolemy's Geographia. Nearby market towns included Essina and Sarapion to the immediate north.

== See also ==
- Miandi
- Nikon
