= Mudun =

- Archaeological site
- Country: Somalia: Puntland
- Region: Bari
- Time zone: UTC+3 (EAT)

Mudun (Ancient Greek: Μουδών) is an archaeological site in the northeastern Bari province of Somalia.

== Overview ==
Mudun is situated in the Wadi valley of the Iskushuban District. The area features a number of ruins, which local tradition holds belong to an ancient, large town. Among the old structures are the remains of three huge mosques. These buildings are surrounded by around 2,000 tombs, which possess high towers and are dome-shaped.

== See also ==
- Bulhar
- Damo
- Mosylon
- Maduna
- Salweyn
- Somali aristocratic and court titles
