= Avalites =

Ancient port city in the Horn of Africa

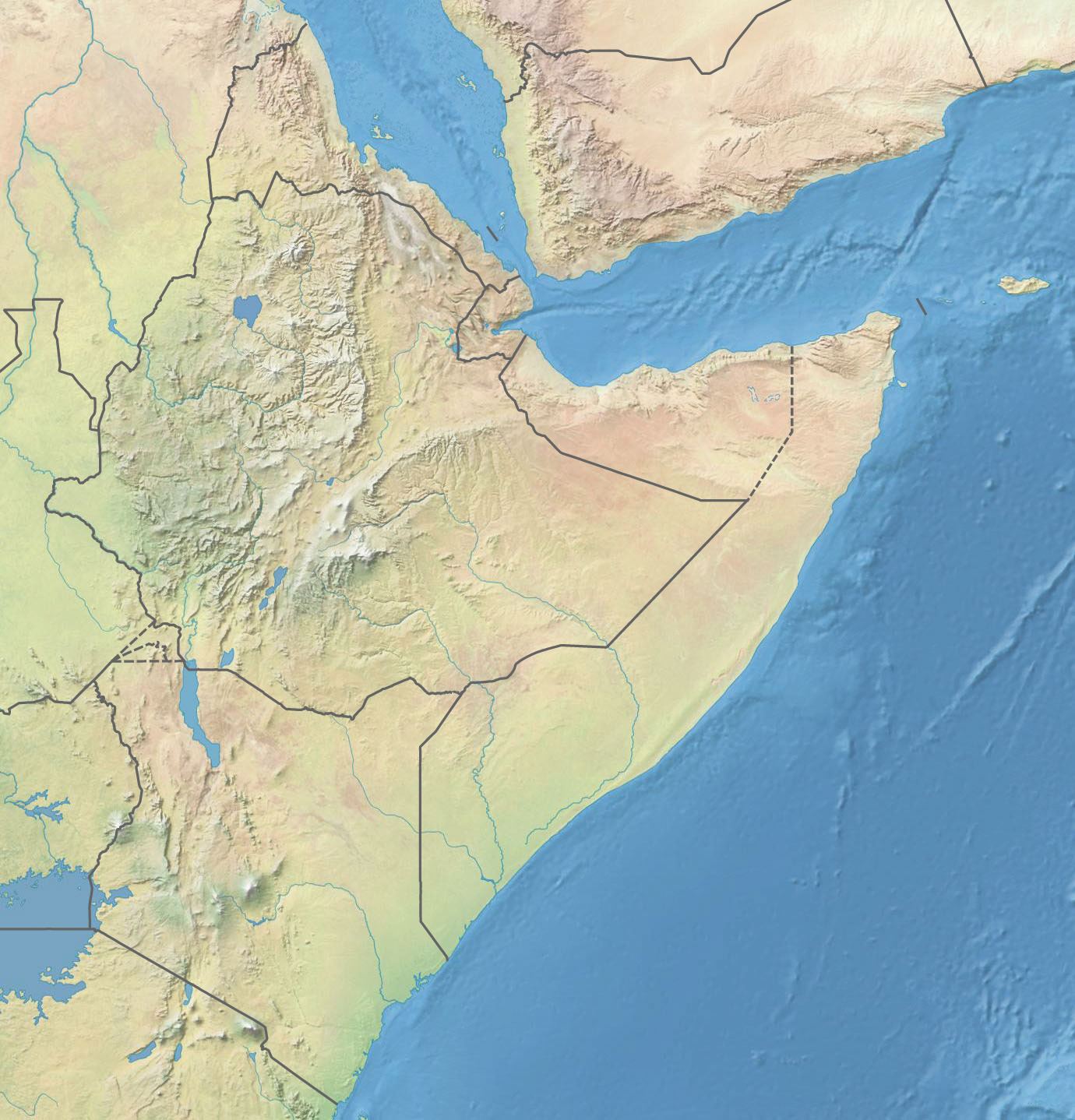
- Location within Somalia Location within Somalia Location within Horn of Africa
- 11°20′N 43°30′E
- Type: emporium
- Periods: Classical antiquity to Late Antiquity
- Cultures: Ancient Somali
- Location: Zeila, Awdal, Somalia

Site notes
- Excavation dates: Unknown
- Archaeologists: Not recorded
- Condition: Ruined

Avalites (Ancient Greek: Αὐαλίτης, Ἀβαλίτης), also known as Abalitês or Abalita/Abolite, alternatively rendered as Aualites, Aualita, or Avalita, was an ancient port city and trading hub situated in the Horn of Africa during Classical and Late Antiquity. Avalites was one of the principal seaports and commercial centres of Aethiopia alongside Adulis and Mosylon. It is widely believed that Avalites was located near the site that later became the coastal town of Zeila in today’s Awdal region, though another proposed location for Avalites is Djibouti. Avalites appears in several Greco-Roman geographical works, including the Periplus of the Erythraean Sea, Pliny’s Natural History, Ptolemy’s Geography, and the Ethnica of Stephanus of Byzantium as well as the Periplus of the Outer Sea by Marcian of Heraclea.

According to the Periplus, Avalites was part of the so-called “far-side” ports of the Barbar (the ancient Somali people), located near the Bab el-Mandeb Strait. It was the first Emporium and port of the Barbar, with the rest extending to as far as to Opone in the east. Avalites was an important center of commerce along the spice and incense trade routes. It was known for supplying and exporting ivory, tortoiseshell, and myrrh, the latter described as being of particularly high quality. Due to its proximity to the Arabian Peninsula, it was accessible by small boats and rafts, and goods were exported by local Barbar seafarers and merchants across the strait to the South Arabian ports of Ocelis and Muza under the Himyarites in todays Yemen. In return, the Barbar imported luxury items from distant lands such as Roman Egypt, particularly from Diospolis (Thebes), including textiles, as well as agricultural products such as wheat, along with wine and tin. Its inhabitants are described in the Periplus as unruly, reflecting their defensive attitude toward foreigners. Avalites’ position at the entrance to the Indo-Roman trade network, linking Roman Egypt, Arabia, and the Horn of Africa, made it a significant trading port for the Barbar people.

== History ==
The first mention of Avalites (or Avalita) dates to the 1st century AD, in the Periplus of the Erythraean Sea. Avalites is described as follows:

From this place the Arabian Gulf (today’s Red Sea) trends toward the east and becomes narrowest just before the Gulf of Avalites. After about four thousand stadia, for those sailing eastward along the same coast, there are other Berber/Barbar market-towns, known as the "far-side" ports; lying at intervals one after the other, without harbors but having roadsteads where ships can anchor and lie in good weather. The first is called Avalites; to this place the voyage from Arabia to the far-side coast is the shortest. Here there is a small market-town called Avalites, which must be reached by boats and rafts. There are imported into this place, flint glass, assorted; juice of sour grapes from Diospolis; dressed cloth, assorted, made for the Berbers; wheat, wine, and a little tin. There are exported from the same place, and sometimes by the Barbars themselves crossing on rafts to Ocelis and Muza on the opposite shore, spices, a little ivory, tortoise-shell, and a very little myrrh, but better than the rest. And the Berbers who live in the place are very unruly.

Other translation versions include:

By now the Arabian Gulf [Red Sea] trends eastward and at Avalites is at its narrowest. After about 4000 stades on an eastward heading along the same coast, come the rest of the ports of trade of the Barbaroi, those called "far-side," lying in a row and offering, by way of anchorages and roadsteads, suitable mooring when the occasion calls. The first is called Avalites; at it the crossing from Arabia to the other side is shortest. At this place there is a small port of trade, namely Avalites, where rafts and small craft put in. It offers a market for: assorted glass stones; some of the unripe olives that come from Diospolis; assorted articles of clothing for the Barbaroi, cleaned by fulling; grain; wine; a little tin. Exports from here, with the transport across to Okelis and Muza on the opposite shore at times carried out by the Barbaroi on rafts, are: aromatics; a little ivory; tortoise shell; a minimal amount of myrrh but finer than any other. The Barbaroi who inhabit the place are rather unruly.

=== Ptolemy and Pliny ===
Pliny, in his Natural History, mentioned Avalites under the names Abalitês/abalito or Abalita (Ancient Greek: Ἀβαλίτης), which is considered to be the same as the earlier Avalites/Avalita of the Periplus. He also mentioned the Bay of Abalitos, which is likewise considered the same as the Gulf of Avalites described in the Periplus. Ptolemy, in his 2nd-century Geography gives the Avalites market place at 74°00′ longitude and 8°25′ latitude, and also mentions Avalites Bay, which extends from Avalites to Aromata.

=== Marcian of Heraclea and Stephanus of Byzantium ===
Marcian of Heraclea, in his 3rd-century Periplus of the Outer Sea, references the Avalitae people and the Avalitic Gulf. He places the Gulf of Avalita on the right-hand side of the Erythraean Sea, along which the Avalitae dwell. The Avalitic Gulf has been suggested to correspond to the bay of Zeila at the head of the Gulf of Aden, although some scholars propose it refers to the Gulf of Tadjoura. Additionally, certain researchers connect the name “Avalitae” with the biblical Obal and with Ubulu mentioned in Assyrian inscriptions. The 6th-century Ethnica of Stephanus of Byzantium situates Avalites Bay in the same location as Marcian and also mentions its inhabitants.

== Origin ==
=== The land of Punt ===
D36 G43 O4 G5 E23
Auhar, Auhal, Auhur
in hieroglyphs
Era: New Kingdom
(1550–1069 BC)

During the reign of Pharaoh Thutmose III, various settlements in the Land of Punt were recorded. At the Temple of Karnak, lists devoted to Punt contain forty names, among which is Auhar/Auhal. According to the French Egyptologist Auguste Mariette, this corresponds to what later Greco-Roman writers referred to as the Avalites emporium. Thus, the roots of Avalites extend back to the Bronze Age and it might have been a millennia old emporium at the time of the Periplus. However, the rise of the Avalite and its re-establishment took place at the end of the 1st century BCE. Between the 1st and 6th century AD, Avalita flourished as an important trading hub of the northern Somali coast, from which its proximity to arabia was crucial for controlling trade routes between the Somali Peninsula and Arabia, as well as the northern Somali coast, India, and Roman Egypt, all passing through the Straits of Bab el-Mandeb, the southern Red Sea, and the Gulf of Aden.

== Inhabitants ==
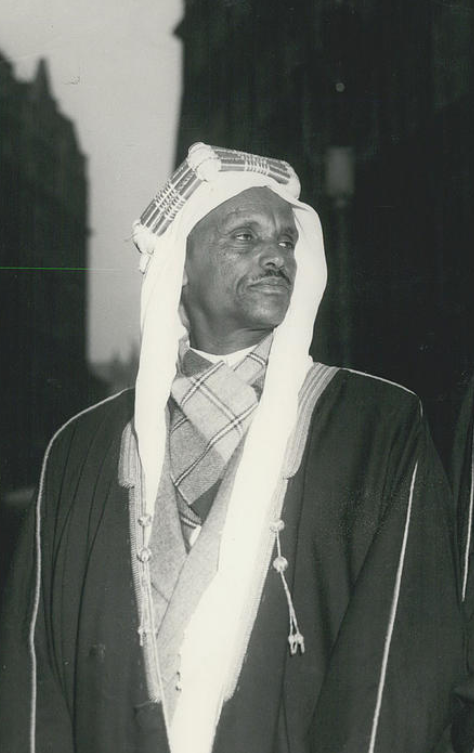
Sultan Abdulrahman Deria, Sultan of the Habr Awal, a dominant Isaaq sub-group, in London in 1955 to petition for the Haud Reserved Area.

The Avalitae were both an ethnos and a region, from which the nearby gulf or bay derived its name, and where the port of Avalites was located. They were among the prominent inhabitants of Barbaria (northern Somalia), alongside the Mossyli of Mosylon.W. Desborough Cooley identified the Avaliae with branch of the Isaaq clan, from which one of the sub-clans of the Isaaq bears its name as Habr Awal. Some have connected the Avalitae to be the descendants of the biblical Obal, a son of Joktan (forefather of the Qahtanite).

Richard F. Burton links the Habr Awal people with the ancient Avalitae mentioned by Ptolemy and in the Periplus of the Erythraean Sea. He notes that Camoens’ reference to the “Barbarica Region” corresponds to the Somali coast, and following Ibn Battuta and Varthema, he identifies this group with the Habr Awal who historically occupied the coast of Zeila to Siyara as the ancient Avalites

== Trade, Economy, and Governance ==
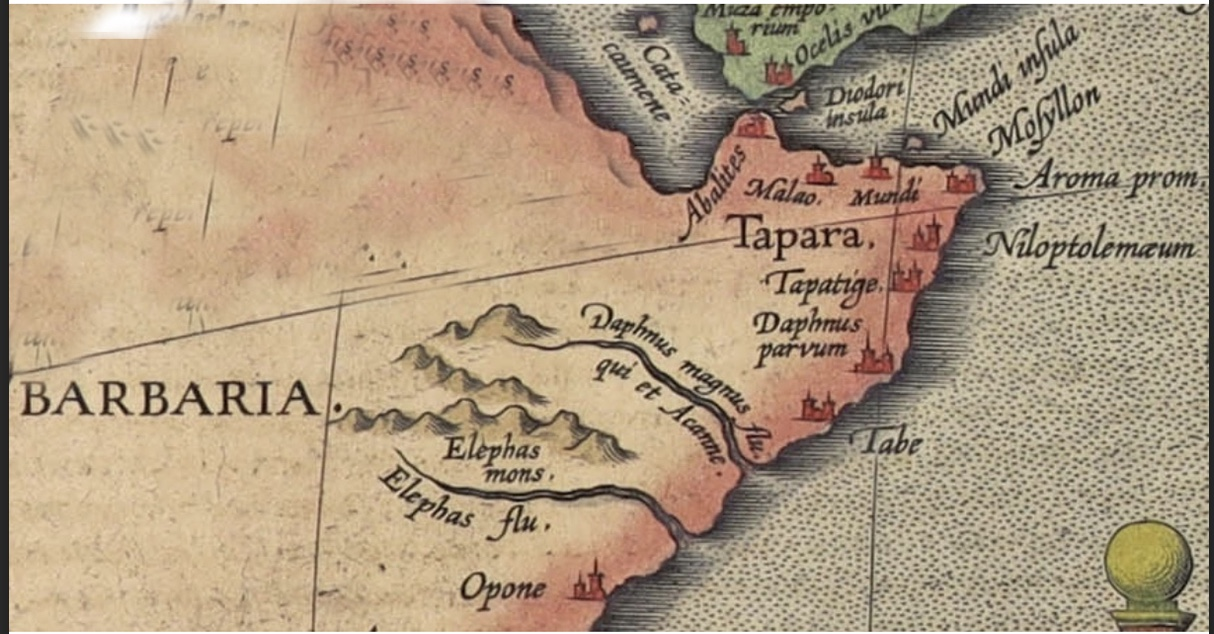
Avalites, earlier known as Abalites. Historical map of the Indian Ocean, by Abraham Ortelius, based on the works of Pliny the Elder and the Periplus..

Avalites was the principal seaport and market town/place of ancient Ethiopia, alongside Adulis and Mosylon. The local Barbar seafarers and merchants exploited their natural resources, which they exported by themselves, navigating along the Red Sea Yemenite coast (Ocelis and Muza, in the area of Al Mokha today). Realizing the value of their products in various markets of the trade network around the Red Sea, the Avalites’ Berbers stood firm against any foreign ruler who would exploit the natural resources of northern Somalia, and their political and military attitude (described as unruly behavior) explains how the neighboring powerful states of the Saba and Himyar kingdoms of Yemen and the Abyssinian kingdom of Axum failed to put this area under their control.

There might have been attempts to annex Avalites; however, due to the continuous resistance of the ancient Somalis, neighboring rulers’ ambitions failed, and foreign navigators’ and merchants’ opinions focused on the Avalites’ Berbers’ unruliness. This situation is further explained by the economic interests of the surrounding powers. The kingdom of Axum likely made the greatest efforts to subdue Avalites, not simply because of proximity, but because its income depended largely on the port of Adulis, as it controlled relatively few harbors. In contrast, the Yemenite kingdoms of Saba and Himyar already controlled extensive Red Sea coastlines and territories beyond Aden, including Azania as far as Rhapta, meaning that controlling Avalites would not have significantly increased their revenue. The trading practices of the Avalites’ Berbers are also revealing, as they preferred to export their goods through Muza and Ocelis rather than through Adulis, likely to avoid taxation and retain greater profits. By doing so, they were directly involved in major trade centers connecting Roman Egypt and India. Their exports, which included spices, small amounts of ivory, tortoise-shell, and high-quality myrrh, highlight the economic importance of Avalites, with spices and myrrh being particularly valuable commodities, while ivory and tortoise-shell were more widely available elsewhere.

== Location and Identification of Avalites. ==
Zeila is considered to be the probable location of ancient avalites. The monumental An Universal History, from the Earliest Account of Time, identifies Zeila with the Avalita/Avarita of Ptolemy and refers to the former glory of the port, which still retains some of its ancient splendor.

=== Dispute ===
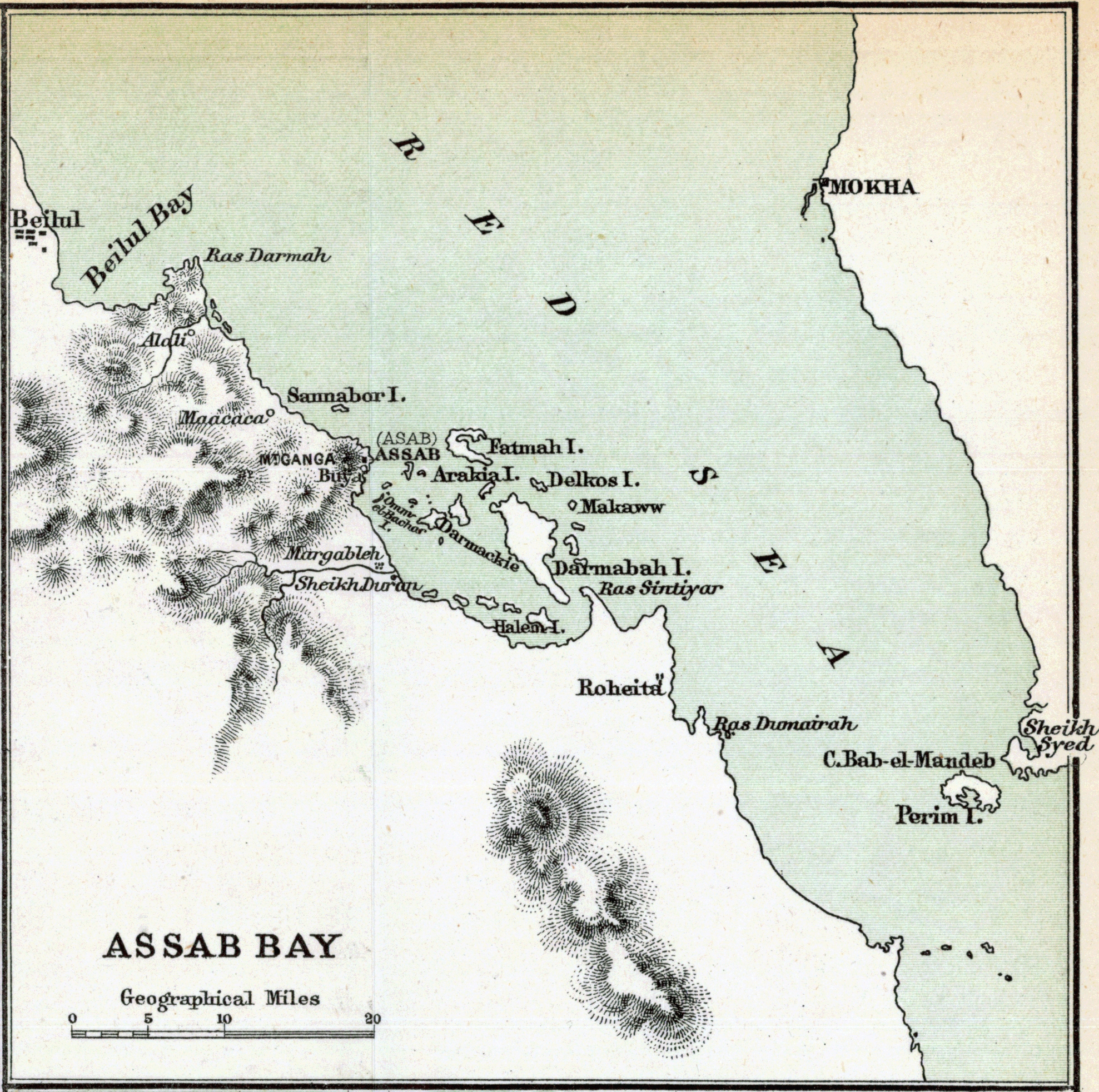
Assab Bay, identified as the location of Avalites by Shamsaddin Megalommatis.

There has been a debate among scholars about the probable location of Avalites. Recent scholars have placed it not at Zeila but at Assab in today’s Eritrea nearby Obock in Djibouti. This identification is supported primarily by two reasons: first, the distance mentioned in the text regarding Avalites, and second, the reference to Avalites as the narrowest point of the Red Sea to Yemen. However, the ancient Somalis dominated Avalites and were its inhabitants, not the Abyssinians. The local population is described as Barbar/Berber, and the author notes that "there are other Berber market-towns" along the coast, extending further beyond Avalites towards Opone. Avalites was also the first of these Berber ports along the northern Somali coast. The Berbers lived at the edge of the Axumite kingdom, which controlled the area north of Avalites up to Adulis. Further Berber hegemony over Avalites is also mentioned in the second passage dealing with the imports of Avalites, where the author mentions Avalites imported "dressed cloth, assorted, made for the Berbers." Since these cloths were made to fit Berber preference and taste, and then imported by the people of Avalites, it is easily deduced that these people were Berbers/Barbar and not Axumite or Abyssinian.

== Connection with Havilah ==
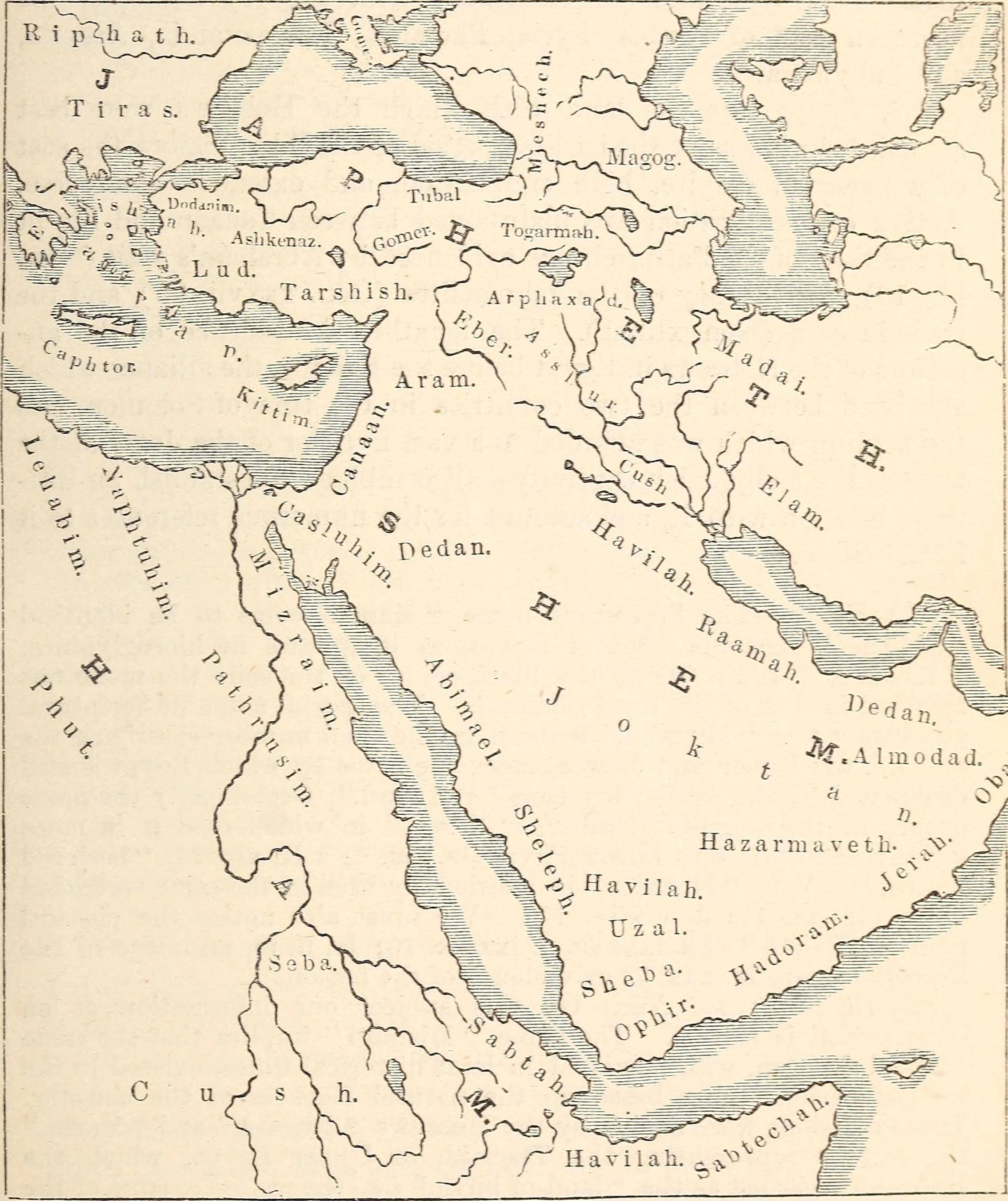
Several locations for Havilah are shown

Historical sources also link Avalites to the biblical land of Havilah. Saadia Gaon’s tenth-century Arabic translation of the Hebrew Bible identifies Havilah with Zeila, while some scholars consider the name Avalites itself as a demonym for Havilah. Gesenius suggested that Avalites was a city belonging to the descendants of Cush. The twelfth-century traveler Benjamin Tudela likewise described the Zeila region as the land of Havilah. Although the precise location of Havilah remains debated, it is variously placed southwest of the Arabian Peninsula or in northern Somalia.

== See also ==
- Mosylon
