= Essina =

Ancient; Essina
Location	Somalia
City-state existed:	1st century AD

Essina (Ancient Greek: Εσσίνα) was an ancient emporium located on the southeastern coast of present-day Somalia in the Horn of Africa.

== History ==
Having risen to prominence in the 2nd century CE, Essina was mentioned in Ptolemy's Geographia. Several modern scholars have positioned the ancient harbour in the vicinity of the early medieval cities of Merca and Barawa in modern-day southern Somalia based on Ptolemy's work. Alternatively, it has been suggested that Essina was buried somewhere along the Benadir coast. However, due to a general lack of excavations in the area, the old city's exact geographical location is unknown.

== See also ==
- Sarapion
- Toniki
- Malao
- Opone
- Mosylon
- Mudun
- Damo
- Heis
- Hannassa
- Gondershe
- Qandala
- Miandi
