= Salweyn =

- Salwine, Salwayn
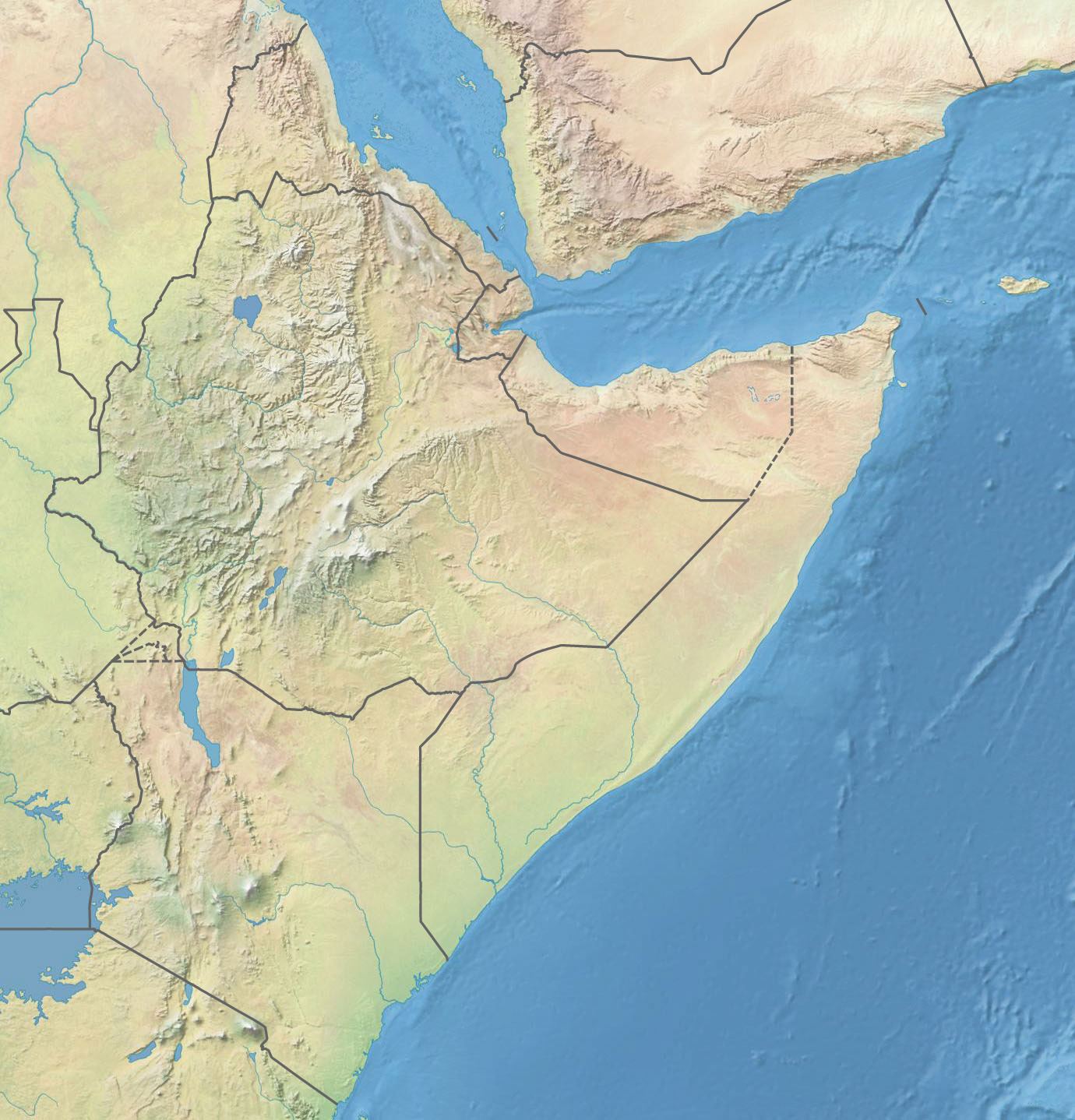
- Location of Salweyn Salweyn (Somaliland) Salweyn (Somalia) Salweyn (Horn of Africa)
- 10°54′55″N 46°55′50″E
- Type: Archaeological site
- Periods: Classical to Late antiquity
- Cultures: Proto-Somali
- Location: Sanaag, Badhan District, Somaliland
- Region: Northern Somalia

Site notes
- Excavation dates: Georges Révoil (1880s)
- Archaeologists: Georges Révoil
- Condition: Ruins
- Public access: Yes

Salweyn, also known as Salwine or Salwayn, is a proto-Somali archaeological site located in the Sanaag region of northwestern Somalia (Somaliland), near the coastal town of Heis and approximately 200 km west of Bosaso. The site dates back at least 2,000 years, or possibly earlier, and is recognized as one of the four oldest urban settlements in northern Somalia, alongside sites at Ras Hafun and Damo. It was the center of an ancient civilization and, during Classical antiquity and Late antiquity, functioned as a prominent trading center and seaport. Archaeological investigations, including those carried out in the late 19th century by the French explorer Georges Révoil, uncovered numerous Greco-Roman artifacts within its vast necropolis, which contains burials with imported commodities. Older literature identifies Salweyn with Mosylon.

== Overview ==
Salweyn is situated to the east of the old coastal town of Heis. A small eponymous creek is located in the area.

== History ==
The site contains a very large field of cairns, which stretches for a distance of around 8 km. While detained by bad weather near Heis at a small creek called Salwine, the French explorer Georges Révoil discovered a large group of tumuli along the creek banks, similar to those he had documented elsewhere in northern Somalia. An excavation of one of these tumuli by him in 1881 uncovered a tomb, beside which were artefacts pointing to an ancient civilization. The interred objects included pottery sherds from Samos, enamel fragments, and a mask of Ancient Greek design. Among other artefact found at Salweyn were glass fragments (millefiori), beads, an alabaster vase, amphorae, and Samian pottery dating from the 1st century BCE to the 1st century CE. Some of these objects are now preserved in the Musée de l’Homme in Paris. Based on these finds, Révoil suggested that Salweyn could correspond to Mosyllum, a port mentioned in the Periplus of the Erythraean Sea.

Salweyn is one of at least four ancient towns along the Djibouti–Hafun coast confirmed to have existed 2,000 years ago or earlier. It lies just east of Xiis roughly 200 km west of Boosaaso. Other contemporaneous settlements include Daamo, associated with the ‘Market of Spices’ in the Periplus, and two settlements in Hafun (Opone), termed Hafun Main and Hafun West, on the local peninsula about 140 km southwest of Raas.

=== Archaeological features ===
Salweyn contains a large cairn field of around 200 tumuli, many of which are neatly covered with shingle. Some have rows of standing stones on their eastern sides, similar to other cairn fields in the region. Only a few disc monuments and low rectangular platform monuments are present. While no significant artifacts were found near the cairns except for stone flakes, extensive shell middens run parallel to the shore for about a kilometre. Evidence of a possible ancient dam made of boulders was also noted. Small fragments of coarse pottery—similar to types found at Hafun—suggest coastal manufacture.

Additionally, close to the cairns are a number of rows of standing stones. These menhirs are similar to those at Heis and Botiala. Along with Macajilayn, Salweyn is also the only local site where specialized ancient disc-like monuments have been found.
