= Hannassa =

Archaeological site in Somalia

- Town
- Country: Somalia
- Time zone: UTC+3 (EAT)

Hannassa is a proto-Somali historic town in southern Somalia.

== History ==
Built on a promontory, Hanassa contains ruins of houses with archways and courtyards. It also features sites with pillar tombs, including a rare octagonal tomb. Additionally, excavations here have retrieved sherds of celadon and undecorated pottery. Amongst the ruins is a small mosque, with a well-preserved mihrab overlooking the Indian Ocean. It's believed to date back to the Ajuran Empire.

== See also ==
- Essina
- Gondershe
- Mosylon
- Miandi
- Nikon (Somalia)
- Sarapion
