= Hobyo District =

Hobyo
- District
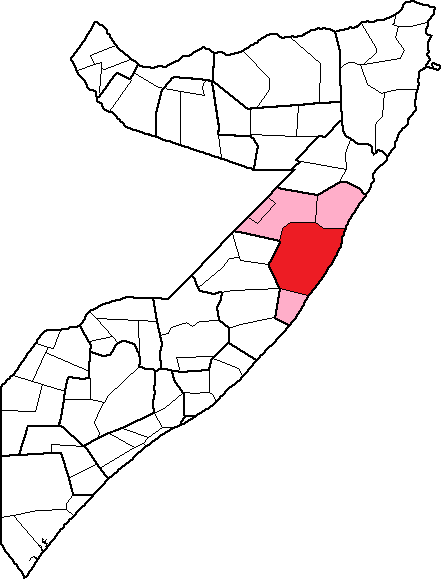
- Country: Somalia
- State ,: Galmudug
- Region: Mudug
- Capital: Hobyo

Population
  - 2005 estimate: 67,249
- Time zone: UTC+3 (EAT)

Hobyo District (Somali: Degmada Hobyo) is a district of Somalia, located in the north-central Mudug region. Its capital is the coastal city of Hobyo.

Hobyo is the largest district in Mudug.
