= Burgabo =

Burgabo Buur Gaabo
- Town
- Location within Somalia
- Coordinates: 1°13′3″S 41°50′16″E
- Country: Somalia
- Province: Lower Jubba
- Established: 1st Century

Population (2011)
  - Total: 30,000

Burgabo (Somali: Buur Gaabo) is a port town in Lower Jubba province in southern Somalia near the border with Kenya. Other names and variants of the town include Berikau, Bircao, Birikao, Birikau, Las Bur Gabo, Bur Gao, Bur Gavo, Hohenzollernhafen, Port Dunford, Port Durnford and Wubushi.

Burgabo lies at the mouth of the Burgabo River and is connected via a dirt road to Kamboni, the southernmost town in Somalia, 55 kilometres (34 mi) away at the Kenyan border. The connections with the sparsely populated inland and towards the north consist of barely accessible paths. The district capital Badhaadhe lies 43 kilometres (27 mi) to the northwest. Offshore are reefs and the Bajuni Islands, which extend northeastward to Kismayo.

On the northern edge of the town, there are extensive charcoal storage sites; charcoal is produced in the hinterland and exported from Burgabo to the Arabian Peninsula via dhow. This export is banned by the United Nations Security Council because the Islamic terror group Al-Shabaab is financed by the proceeds.

== History ==
=== Greco-Roman ===
The area is believed to correspond with the ancient emporium of Nikon, which is described in the 1st century CE Greco-Roman travelogue the Periplus of the Erythraean Sea.

The archaeological site (known by the early 20th century name Port Dunford) contains a number of ancient ruins, including several pillar tombs. Prior to its collapse, one these structures' pillars stood 11 meters high from the ground, making it the tallest tower of its kind in the wider region.

Additionally, the area features a square edifice covered with a low, dome-shaped vault. It is one of the main local standing structures.

In 1913, Haywood reportedly found at Port Dunford a large collection of old coins, along with a vessel similar to a Greek amphora. He later disposed of the amphora pieces, and the vessel was also said to have been crushed during a storm. In 1930, Hayward showed the coins to an official with the British Museum, H. Mattingly. 87 pieces in total, they ranged in date from the 3rd century BCE to the early 4th century CE. Among the coins were 17 copper mints from the Ptolemy III to Ptolemy V dynasties of Ptolemaic Egypt, five pieces of uncertain origin dating from the 1st to 3rd centuries BCE, six pieces that had been minted under Imperial Rome between the reigns of Nero and Antoninus Pius, forty-six coins ranging from Roman Emperors Maximinus II to Constans, six mints derived from the Egyptian Mamluk Sultanate, and seven pieces from Ottoman Egypt.

=== Early trading ===
Based on the archaeological finds, Mortimer Wheeler suggested that Port Dunford was likely a trading station from at least the Roman period. In 1955, he and Dr. A.G. Mathew in turn visited the area. They discovered porcelain, pottery and building remains dating from the 16th century onwards.

=== 19th century ===
Following an agreement between the German East Africa Company and Sultan Ali ibn Ismail of Kismayo at the end of 1886, a German trading station called Hohenzollernhafen (Note: Hohenzollernhafen was named for Germany's ruling House of Hohenzollern. However, Chancellor Otto von Bismarck thought the naming premature and called it "arbitrary and not generous" (willkürlich und nicht genehrn).) was established at Wubushi (Burgabo) Bay. At that time, the entire southern part of the Somali coast was nominally in the hands of the Sultanate of Zanzibar, but the Germans circumvented that problem by concluding a protection treaty with Ali ibn Ismail, who was hostile to Zanzibar.

After the Heligoland–Zanzibar Treaty of 1890, the area came under British suzerainty and the port was renamed Port Durnford (Note: Port Durnford was probably named after Midshipman Edward Philip Durnford (1803–1824), who died at sea on HMS Leven off Madagascar.) (also Port Dunford or Wubushi).

=== 20th century ===
In 1905, the area was described as follows:

"To the south of Kismayu the coast presents a series of small islands, but no feature of importance, except Port Durnford, a harbour of some size and depth. It was formerly a Government station, it being thought unadvisable in the old slaving days to leave a long stretch of coast without any officer; but now that the slave trade has been abolished, this station has been closed, though the buildings still remain in the charge of a few police. There are a few inhabitants, but the scrub and sand begin immediately round the village, and give one a good idea of the desolation of the district."

Port Durnford formed part of the East Africa Protectorate (first part of Tanaland province and later Jubaland) until, along with the rest of Jubaland, was ceded to the Italians in 1924 when it became known as Bur Gavo. First part of Trans-Juba, it became part of Italian Somaliland in 1926 and, with independence in 1960, part of Somalia.

=== 21st century ===
At the beginning of the 21st century, the town numbered just under 4,000 residents, similar to the population at the start of the 20th century (about 3,500 residents). In the Somali Civil War, the city was a haven for various Islamist groups, and the population fell to around 300 in 2011. Expeditionary Kenya Defence Forces and Somali Armed Forces of the Federal Government of Somalia, supported by French naval artillery and U.S. air strikes, occupied the area of Burgabo at the end of October 2011 in the campaign against Al-Shabaab terrorists.

== Climate ==
Burgabo has a hot semi-arid climate with an average annual temperature of 27.2 °C or 81.0 °F. The hottest month is April with an average of 28.8 °C or 83.8 °F the coolest month is July, averaging 25.6 °C or 78.1 °F. The annual precipitation amounts to approximately 612 millimetres or 24 inches. The dry season is from January to March, followed by a rainy season from April to July. After that, rainfall regularly falls with a small peak in October. The wettest month is May when there is then about 130 millimetres or 5 inches, more than a fifth of the annual total. The annual fluctuations can also be considerable.

Climate data for Burgabo
Month	Jan	Feb	Mar	Apr	May	Jun	Jul	Aug	Sep	Oct	Nov	Dec	Year
Mean daily maximum °C (°F)	30.2 (86.4)	30.4 (86.7)	31.2 (88.2)	30.8 (87.4)	29.0 (84.2)	28.1 (82.6)	27.6 (81.7)	27.7 (81.9)	28.5 (83.3)	29.2 (84.6)	29.8 (85.6)	30.1 (86.2)	29.4 (84.9)
Daily mean °C (°F)	27.0 (80.6)	27.1 (80.8)	28.1 (82.6)	28.1 (82.6)	26.8 (80.2)	25.9 (78.6)	25.3 (77.5)	25.3 (77.5)	25.8 (78.4)	26.6 (79.9)	27.2 (81.0)	27.4 (81.3)	26.7 (80.1)
Mean daily minimum °C (°F)	25.1 (77.2)	25.1 (77.2)	26.0 (78.8)	26.1 (79.0)	25.1 (77.2)	24.3 (75.7)	23.6 (74.5)	23.5 (74.3)	24.0 (75.2)	24.6 (76.3)	25.2 (77.4)	25.6 (78.1)	24.9 (76.8)
Average rainfall mm (inches)	23 (0.9)	5 (0.2)	20 (0.8)	84 (3.3)	128 (5.0)	62 (2.4)	47 (1.9)	36 (1.4)	32 (1.3)	53 (2.1)	74 (2.9)	48 (1.9)	612 (24.1)
Average rainy days	2	1	4	14	17	13	11	10	8	10	12	8	110
Average relative humidity (%)	74	73	73	75	79	76	74	74	73	75	77	76	75
Mean daily sunshine hours	8.5	8.6	8.9	8.3	7.7	8.5	8.7	8.6	8.3	8.1	8.7	8.9	8.5

== See also ==
- Nikon
- Sarapion
- Somali aristocratic and court titles
