= Zengisa Acra =

Zengisa Acra, was a regional name which existed along the east of the Horn of Africa during the 1st millennium.

The later "Ajan Coast" was first mentioned after the Sultanate of Mogadishu. The term Ajan is sometimes used interchangeably with Azania. However, Cyril Hromnik, has suggested Ajan comes from the Indian term Ajan Bar. The Ajan Coast appears prominently in the times of Adal Sultanate as a land of multiple kings, deserts and a long coastline with two capitals at Mogadishu and Zeila.

However, the overlapping analysis frequently places the core of Ajan Coast in the region of the plains beyond the promontory (Ras Hafun) that follows the Horn's headland. The Ajan Coast was bordered to the north by Aromata, to the west by Rauso, to the south by various peoples including the Zanj and Tunni and to the east by the Indian Ocean. A notable city state of Ajan was Sarapion.

According to Latin descriptions of the 16th century Global Maps and in conjunction with Al Idrisi and Ibn Said's 13th century remarks on the coast, Ajan, Aian, Adjan or Acanne (fire) is the antique reference for Aiaua or Hawiye, with its capital at Mogadishu. This is in part confirmed by the Latin definition of Bar Ajjam as the Land of Fire. Though erroneously quoted by Burton, it refers to comments by Al Dimishqi in the 14th century "Then it passes the coasts of Hawya, called this way because it resembles hell because of the heat and the intensity of the fire of the sun, then those of Berberah, a part of Demdem and lower Abyssinie".
