= Botiala =

Coordinates: 11.4731°N 49.9494°E

- Archaeological site
- Interactive map of Botiala
- Country: Somalia
- Region: Bari
- Time zone: UTC+3 (EAT)

Botiala (Somali: Butiyaalo), also known as Bottiala or Bandar Kor, is an archaeological site in the northeastern Bari region of Puntland.

== History ==
Botiala is located in a valley to the east of the ancient port city of Qandala, between Cape Guardafui and Bosaso. The area is abundant in frankincense of the highest quality.

Nearby are around 200 stone monuments (taalos), most of which consist of cairns. The bigger cairns are covered in shingles and tend to be more sturdily constructed. There are a number of rows of standing stones (menhirs) on the eastern side of the structures, which are similar to those at Salweyn, a great cairn-held situated close to Heis. Besides cairns, the Botiala area also features a few other drystone monuments. These include disc monuments with circular, ground-level features, as well as low, rectangular platform monuments.

A couple of hundred meters away are extensive shell middens. These stretch along the shoreline for a distance of around a kilometer. The site also contains the remains of what was apparently a dam that was built from boulders. This structure is located in an area near a shallow drainage line, which passes through mounds.

Additionally, some pottery sherds have been found in Botiala. The fragments are gritty and coarse, and resemble the ware at Hafun.

== See also ==
- Damo
- Mosylon
- Somali aristocratic and court titles
