= Pillar tomb =

Type of monumental grave

A pillar tomb is a type of monumental grave wherein the central feature is a single, prominent pillar or column, often made of stone.

== Overview ==
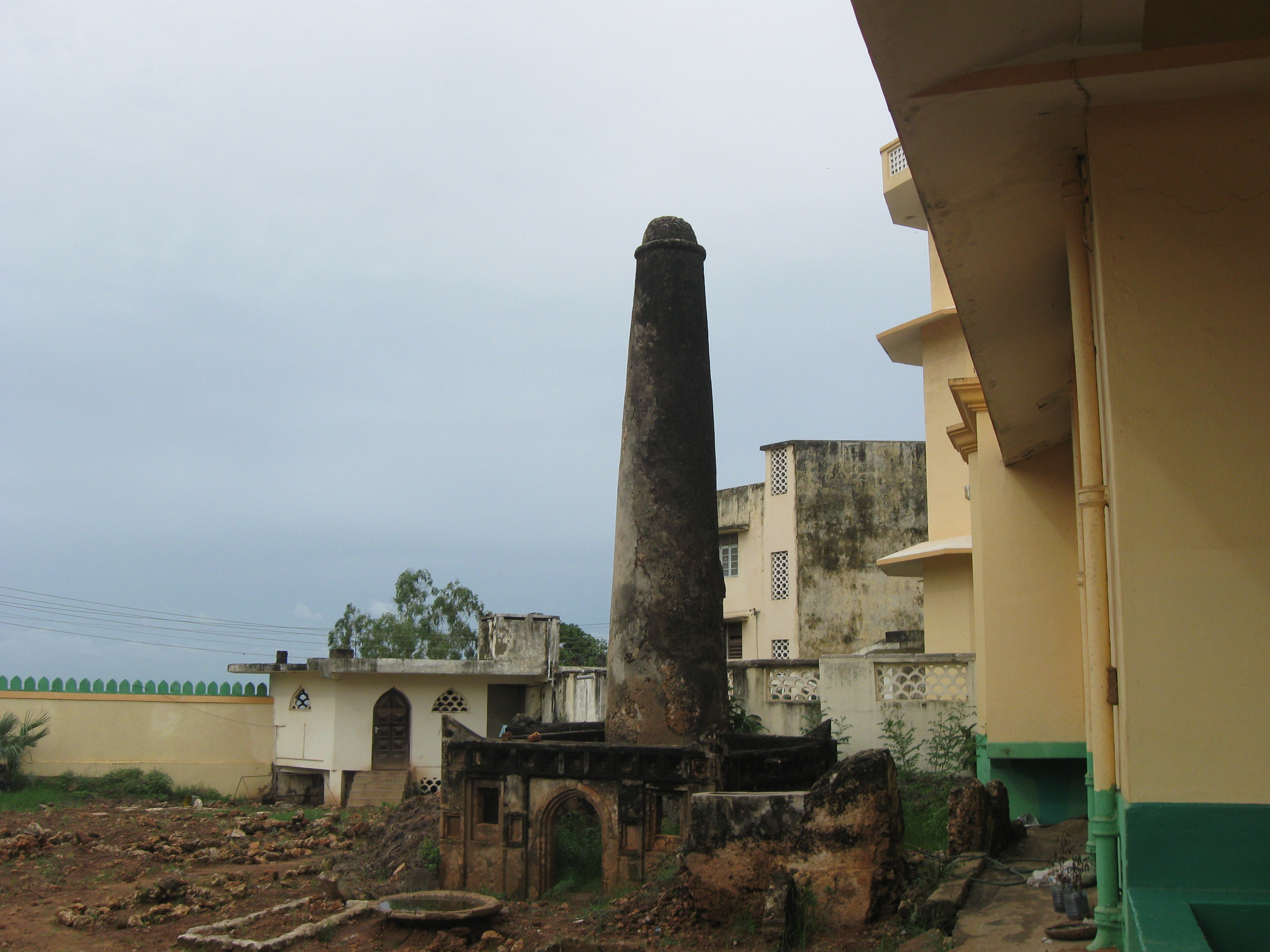
Pillar tomb in Malindi, Kenya

A number of world cultures incorporated pillars into tomb structures. Examples of such edifices are found in Lycia in Anatolia (e.g., the Harpy Tomb at Xanthos), and the medieval Muslim Swahili culture of the Swahili Coast (e.g., tombs at Malindi and Mnarani), which were originally built of coral rag, and later of stone.

In the historic town of Hannassa in southern Somalia, ruins of houses with archways and courtyards have been found along with pillar tombs, including a rare octagonal one. Port Dunford, situated nearby, also contains a number of ancient ruins, including several pillar tombs. Prior to its collapse, one of these structures' pillars stood 11 metres (36 ft) high from the ground, making it the tallest of its kind in the region.

== See also ==
- Obelisk
