= Macajilayn =

- Archaeological site
- Country: Somaliland
- Region: Sanaag
- Time zone: UTC+3 (EAT)

Macajilayn, also spelled Mecajilayn, is a proto-Somali archaeological site located in the Sanaag region of Somaliland.

== Overview ==
Macajilayn is situated to the east of the old coastal town of Heis.

The site contains a number of cairns, from which excavations have yielded Roman and Nubian imports. Based on these finds, the structures have been estimated to date between the 1st and 4th centuries CE.

Additionally, along with Salweyn, Macajilayn is the only local site where specialized ancient disc-like monuments have been found.
