= Malao =

Ancient name of Berbera city

Ancient; Malao
Location	Berbera, Somaliland
City-state existed:	1st century AD

Malao (Ancient Greek: Μαλαὼ) was an ancient port city in present-day Somaliland. The town was situated on the site of what later would become the city of Berbera. It was a key trading center involved in the Red Sea-Indian Ocean trade during Late Antiquity. The town maintained an important monetary market, exchanging goods in the currencies of the Roman Empire.

== History and trade ==
The ancient port city of Malao was positioned in the historic Somali city of Berbera. It is mentioned in the 1st century CE Periplus of the Erythraean Sea:

"After Avalites there is another market-town, better than this, called Malao, distant a sail of about eight hundred stadia. The anchorage is an open roadstead, sheltered by a spit running out from the east. Here the natives are more peaceable. There are imported into this place the things already mentioned, and many tunics, cloaks from Arsinoe, dressed and dyed; drinking-cups, sheets of soft copper in small quantity, iron, and gold and silver coin, not much. There are exported from these places myrrh, a little frankincense, (that known as far-side), the harder cinnamon, duaca, Indian copal and macir, which are imported into Arabia; and slaves, but rarely."

— Chap.8.

Other than Arabia, goods were also purchased and transported to the Greek, Roman and Egyptian empires. Malao gained its high level of trade from its nexus position, by being the closest African port to Arabia and the more peaceful nature of the city, as compared to other potential trade areas.

== See also ==
- Mundus
- Sarapion
- Opone
- Mosylon
- Essina
- Hannassa
