= De mirabilibus mundi =

De mirabilibus mundi may refer to:

- De mirabilibus mundi, a work falsely attributed to Ovid
- De mirabilibus mundi, a work by Gaius Julius Solinus
- De mirabilibus mundi, alternative name for the Otia Imperialia of Gervase of Tilbury
- De mirabilibus mundi, a work falsely attributed to Albert the Great

== See also ==
- Mirabilia mundi (c. 1240), Latin compilation
