= Gondal, Somalia =

Archaeological site in Somalia

Gondal is a proto-Somali archaeological site in southern Somalia. The site of ancient ruins, it is considered a predecessor of Kismayo.

== See also ==
- Abasa
- Nimmo
- Somali architecture
