= Ocelis =

Coordinates: 12°45′59″N 43°39′03″E

Ocelis or Okelis (Ancient Greek: Ὄκηλις ἐμπόριον/Okêlis emporion; and Ὤκηλις) was a port on the Red Sea, on the Arabian side near or at Bab al-Mandeb, the strait separating the Red Sea from the Gulf of Aden, part of the ancient reckoning of Arabia Felix. It is placed by Ptolemy a little to the north of the straits of the Red Sea. It belonged to the Elisari, and was subject to Cholebus. The place also sometimes appears as Acila or Akila (Ἀκίλα).

Ocelis belonged to the South Arabian kingdom of Saba-Himyar and is known as a stop on the maritime route from Egypt to India in the 1st century CE. In the 1st century, Periplus Maris Erythraei describes it as "not so much a port of trade as harbour, watering station, and the first place to put in for those sailing on". Pliny the Elder reports their destination and describes Ocelis as the first stop on the sea journey from Egypt to India.

Ocelis was visited by traders coming over from the African side on rafts with aromatics, myrrh, ivory, and tortoise shell; this being the only report of African navigation in this work.

The site of Ocelis is tentatively identified as at Khor Ghurayrah (Shaykh Sa'id) in Yemen. During the 18th century, a port identified as Ocelis was known as Ziden. It was described as a settlement of 500 houses with over a hundred ships in the anchorage.
