= Nikon (Somalia) =

Ancient; Nikon
Location	Somalia
City-state existed:	2nd century

Nikon (alternatively spelled Nicon; Ancient Greek: Νίκων, romanized: Níkōn) was a proto-Somali ancient coastal emporium in the Horn of Africa. It was described in the 1st century CE Greco-Roman travelogue the Periplus of the Erythraean Sea as being situated in the vicinity of Burgabo in the southern Jubaland region of present-day Somalia.

== See also ==
- Sarapion
- Maritime history of Somalia
