= Miandi =

- Town
- Country: Somalia
- Region: Lower Juba
- Time zone: UTC+3 (EAT)

Miandi is a proto-Somali small town in the southern Lower Juba province of Somalia.

== Overview ==
Miandi is situated in the southernmost part of the country, at a radius of one to two miles from Ras Cuaodo.

An ancient walled town, it is an important local archaeological site. Among the various old ruins is a finely-plastered mosque. The square bases of four of the masjid's interior columns still stand.

Additionally, the town contains a number of pillar tombs. According to Elliot, who examined the structures, the long shaft of one of the collapsed pillars was especially well-made.

== See also ==
- Somalian architecture
