= Macrobians =

Legendary people

Reconstruction of the Oikumene (inhabited world) as described by Herodotus in the 5th century BC.

The Macrobians (Μακροβίοι) were a legendary people mentioned by Herodotus, speculated to have lived in the Horn of Africa. They were one of the peoples postulated by the Greeks to exist at the extremity of the known world; in this case, in the extreme south. This contrasts with the Hyperboreans, who were said to live in the extreme north.

Their name literally meaning "long-lived", the Macrobians were so-called for their legendary longevity: the average Macrobian was said to live to the age of 120. Said to be the "tallest and handsomest of all men", the Macrobians were reported as distinct in customs from "all other nations".

== Accounts ==
According to Herodotus' account, the Persian Emperor Cambyses II upon his conquest of Egypt (525 BC) sent ambassadors to Macrobia, bringing luxury gifts for the Macrobian king to entice his submission. The Macrobian ruler, who was elected based at least in part on stature, replied instead with a challenge for his Persian counterpart in the form of an unstrung bow: if the Persians could manage to string it, they would have the right to invade his country; but until then, they should thank the gods that the Macrobians never decided to invade their empire.

Herodotus detailed how the Macrobians practiced an elaborate form of embalming. The Macrobians preserved the bodies of the dead by first extracting moisture from the corpses, then overlaying the bodies with a type of plaster, and finally decorating the exterior in vivid colors in order to imitate the deceased as realistically as possible. They then placed the body in a hollow crystal pillar, which they kept in their homes for a period of about a year. Herodotus writes:

Last after this they [the Persian spies] viewed the Ethiopian coffins; these are said to be made of alabaster, as I shall describe: they cause the dead body to shrink, either as the Egyptians do or in some other way, then cover it with gypsum and paint it all as far as possible in the likeness of the living man; then they set it within a hollow pillar of alabaster, which they dig in abundance from the ground, and it is easily worked; the body can be seen in the pillar through the alabaster, no evil stench nor anything unpleasant proceeding from it, and showing clearly all its parts, as if it were the man himself. The nearest of kin keep the pillar in their house for a year, giving it of the first-fruits and offering it sacrifices; after which they bring the pillars out and set them round about the city.

According to Herodotus, Cambyses, after conquering Egypt and while still in Memphis, had planned three expeditions, a fleet expedition against the Carthaginians west of the Mediterranean sea and a land expedition against the Ammonians of Siwa west of Egypt in Libya and against the Macrobians farther southwest of Libya towards the ends of the earth (the Atlantic Ocean). According to Herodotus the Pillars of Hercules and the Atlas pillar of the sky marked the western boundary for the land of Libya (Africa). While the Erythraean sea (Indian Ocean) of Arabia (east of the Nile) marked the southern boundary for Africa. So Cambyses, instead of crossing the western desert directly from Memphis to attack the Ammonians and Macrobians of Libya, decided first to go south to Thebes where he fought no battle and plundered the old abandoned city of Amun. While in Thebes Cambyses sent an army of 50,000 troops west to the Siwa Oasis with orders to conquer and enslave the Ammonians of Siwa and burn the oracle of their God Ammon (the new city of Amun).

While sending his troops west, Cambyses himself decided to go further south of Thebes to the city of Elephantine. According to the Elephantine Papyri, Cambyses and his army of Persians had "knocked down all the temples of the Gods of Egypt". After Cambyses had plundered the city of Elephantine he went further south to conquer the Ethiopians that bordered Egypt near the first cataract of the Nile and the Ethiopians of Nysa in Napata who dwelt beyond Egypt further south near the 4th Cataract. According to later Greek historians such as Diodorus, Siculus, and Strabo, Cambyses army had reached Meroe and gave it its name. But according to Herodotus Cambyses never went pass the 2nd cataract but instead left the Nile river and crossed the western desert toward Libya where the Macrobians dwelt.

After conquering Ethiopia south of Egypt with no food provision and no baggage beast, Cambyses entered upon the desert west of Ethiopia in order to try and reach the Macrobians dwelling at the ends of the earth or the opposite end of the continent, but after getting deeper into the desert and only accomplishing a fifth of the distance (south of Siwa), the army of Cambyses resorted to cannibalism on their own fellow troops. When Cambyses heard of his army eating each other, he immediately stopped his expedition against the Macrobians and marched the remnant of his army back to Thebes on the Nile river of Egypt. And from Thebes they marched safely back to Memphis, where he ordered his Greek mercenaries to return to their homes. From Nubia or Ethiopia south of Egypt, Cambyses took the same western route as his army did from Thebes attempting to reach the Siwa Oasis, and according to the ancient geographer Strabo, Cambyses from Ethiopia had crossed the same western desert that his army had crossed from Thebes when "they were overwhelmed when a wind-storm struck them."

According to Herodotus in a later chapter when he is describing the eastern, southern and western (Asia, Arabia, Libya) ends of the inhabited Earth, he makes it known that the Macrobians were the farthest inhabitants towards the sunset (west) of the southern Nile river beyond the western Sahara. Herodotus also makes it known that only two tribes accomplished this long journey from the Nile river to the western ends of Africa (Libya), these two tribes were known as the Libyan Nasamones, who spoke an alien language to the inhabitants, and the Ichthyophagi of Elephantine, who spoke the same language as the inhabitants, but Cambyses with his huge army failed to accomplish what the Nasamones and Ichthyophagi had already completed.

Cambyses, after being insulted by the tallest and long-lived (Macrobian) King of Ethiopia in the west, he eagerly wanted to conquer and subdue all people of Amun and destroy all temples of the God, but failed in his desperate attempt. And although Cambyses had departed from Susa to invade and conquer the land of Egypt by crossing the Sinai desert and afterwards departing from Egypt to reach the southern realms of Ethiopia south of Egypt, he was still far away from the land of the Macrobians, who dwelt beyond the vast Sahara desert at the ends of the earth as far as the Ocean towards the western sunset.

== Location ==
According to Herodotus they dwelt geographically along the sea south of Libya on the Atlantic. This Libya was far south of the Pillars of Hercules and Atlas Mountains along the Atlantic coast, while the northern Libyan sea coast was the Mediterranean Sea that stretched from Egypt to Morocco in an east to west direction. Concerning the southern sea, Herodotus places the Persians east of the southern sea in Asia, the Arabians & East Africans south of the sea in Arabia and the Macrobians west of the southern Sea in Libya. Herodotus also stated that the Macrobians were indigenous to southern Libya while the Libyans along the Mediterranean Sea were indigenous to northern Libya. Later authors such as Scylax in his periplus also place them south of the pillars of Hercules, and Scylax also reported a trade taking place between Phoenicians (Carthaginians) and tall Ethiopians (Macrobians). Herodotus also mentions a silent trade of gold that took place between Carthaginians and natives south of Libya beyond the Pillars of Hercules; it was also this gold trade that motivated Cambyses, the King of Persia, to plan a land and sea expedition against both the Carthaginians and Macrobian. Pliny in his natural histories places them west of Meroe, far west of Meroe beyond the deserts of Chad that is. Historical accounts of the Macrobians also have much in common with the pastoral Somali, who are similarly known to be tall, handsome warriors who sustained themselves mainly on meat and milk. This perspective that places the Macrobians in Somali territory was suggested by the German historian Arnold Hermann Ludwig Heeren in the 1800s.

== See also ==
- History of Ethiopia
- History of Eritrea
- History of Djibouti
- History of Somalia
- History of Somaliland
- Proto-Somalis
- Somalis
- Aithiopia
- Ancient Libya
- Sigelwara Land
- Fountain of Youth
- Land of Punt
- Kingdom of Kush
