= Opone =

Ancient proto-Somali trading center

Ancient; Opone
Location	Hafun, Somalia
City-state existed:	1st millennium BC–500 AD

Opone (Ancient Greek: Ὀπώνη ἐμπόριον) was an ancient seaport and emporium located in present-day Somalia. It is primarily known for its trade with the Ancient Egyptians, Romans, Greeks, Persians, and the states of ancient India. The historic port has been identified with the city of Hafun through archaeological remains. It is possible that it corresponds to the Land of Punt as known by the ancient Egyptians during the Old, Middle, and New Kingdom.

== History and trade ==
Opone, like other city-states such as Avalites, Malao, and Mosylon, came into existence with the collapse of the Macrobian kingdom.

Pottery found in Oponean tombs date back to the Mycenaean period of Greece between the 16th and 11th century BC. Its major periods of activity were during the 1st century BC and the 3rd to the 5th centuries AD. Opone was mentioned by an anonymous Greek merchant in the 1st century AD Periplus of the Erythraean Sea. The town is featured in the ancient document's thirteenth entry, which in part states:

And then, after sailing four hundred stadia along a promontory, toward which place the current also draws you, there is another market-town called Opone, into which the same things are imported as those already mentioned, and in it, the greatest quantity of cinnamon is produced, (the arebo and moto), and a great quantity of tortoiseshell, better than that found elsewhere.

Opone served as a port of call for merchants from Phoenicia, Egypt, Greece, Persia, Yemen, Nabataea, Azania, the Roman Empire and elsewhere, as it sat at a strategic location along the coastal route from the Mokhan trading center of Azania to the Red Sea. Merchants from as far afield as Indonesia and Malaysia passed through the city, exchanging spices, silks, and other goods, before departing south for Azania or north to Yemen or Egypt on the trade routes that spanned the length of the Indian Ocean's rim. As early as 50 AD, it was well known as a center for the cinnamon trade, along with the barter of cloves and other spices, ivory, exotic animal skins and incense.

== Archaeological remains ==
Ancient Egyptian, Roman and Persian Gulf pottery has been recovered from the site by an archaeological team from the University of Michigan. In the 1970s, Neville Chittick, a British archaeologist, initiated the British-Somali expedition where he and his Somali colleagues encountered remains of ancient drystone walls, houses with courtyards, and the location of the old harbour.

== See also ==
- Essina
- Sarapion
- Qandala
- History of Somalia
