= Emporium (antiquity) =

Trading post of classical antiquity

An emporium refers to a trading post, factory, or market of classical antiquity, derived from ἐμπόριον empórion, which becomes emporium in Latin. The plural is emporia in both languages, although in Greek the plural undergoes a semantic shift towards 'merchandise'. Emporium is a term that has also been used to describe the centres of heightened trade during the Early Middle Ages.

Emporia varied greatly in their level of activity. Some seem to have functioned much like the permanent European trading colonies in China, India and Japan in the early modern period or those of the mediaeval Italian maritime republics in the Levant. Others were probably annual events for a few days or weeks like the medieval Champagne fairs or modern trade fairs.

== Examples ==
Famous emporia include:

- Elim, where Hatshepsut kept her Red Sea fleet;
- Eilat, where Thebes was supplied with mortuary materials, linen, bitumen, naphtha, frankincense, myrrh and carved stone amulets from Palestine, Canaan, Aram, Lebanon, Ammon, Hazor, Moab, Edom, Punt and the Arabian Peninsula from Petra to Midian;
- Naucratis, the only Greek colony in Egypt;
- Olbia, which exported cereals, fish and slaves;
- and Sais, where Solon went to acquire the knowledge of Egypt.

In the Hellenic and Ptolemaic realm, emporia included the various Greek, Phoenician, Egyptian and other city-states and trading posts in the circum-Mediterranean area. Among these commercial hubs were cities like Avaris and Syene in Lower Egypt, Thebes in Upper Egypt, and Opone, Elim, Elat and other Red Sea ports. For the Hittites, it encompassed Kanesh and Kadesh. For Phoenicia, it included Cádiz, Carthage, Leptis Magna, and Cyrene, among others (although Cyrene had been founded by Greeks).

Ancient Greek writers described certain locations in ancient India and Taprobana as emporia.

== See also ==
- Emporion

== Sources ==
- Valente, Marcello (2023). _elementi di razionalità economica nel commercio greco. Pisa: Edizioni ETS. ISBN 9788846766588.
- Birley, Anthony. Septimius Severus: The African Emperor. pp. 1–7.
