= Mosylon =

Ancient Proto-Somali trading port in Somalia

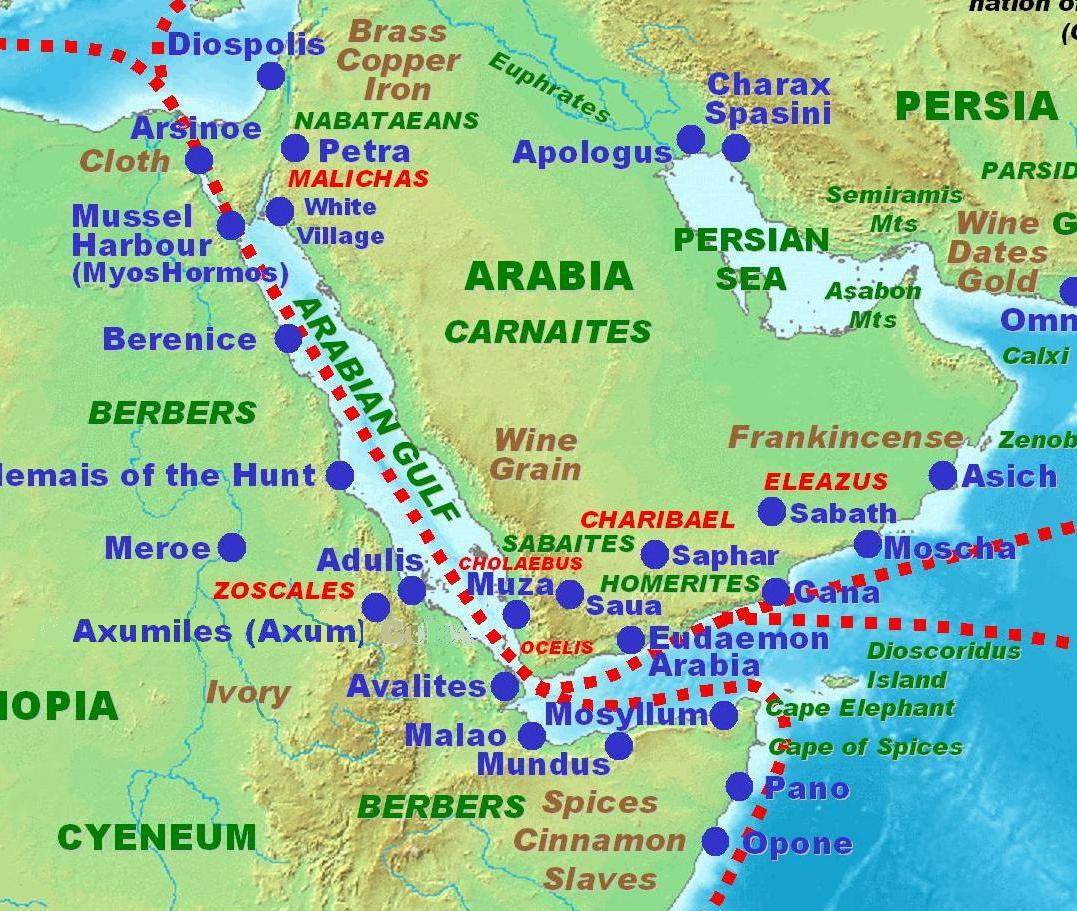
- Approximate location of Mosylon in the Periplus of the Erythraean Sea. The exact location is debated between Bosaso and Salweyn.

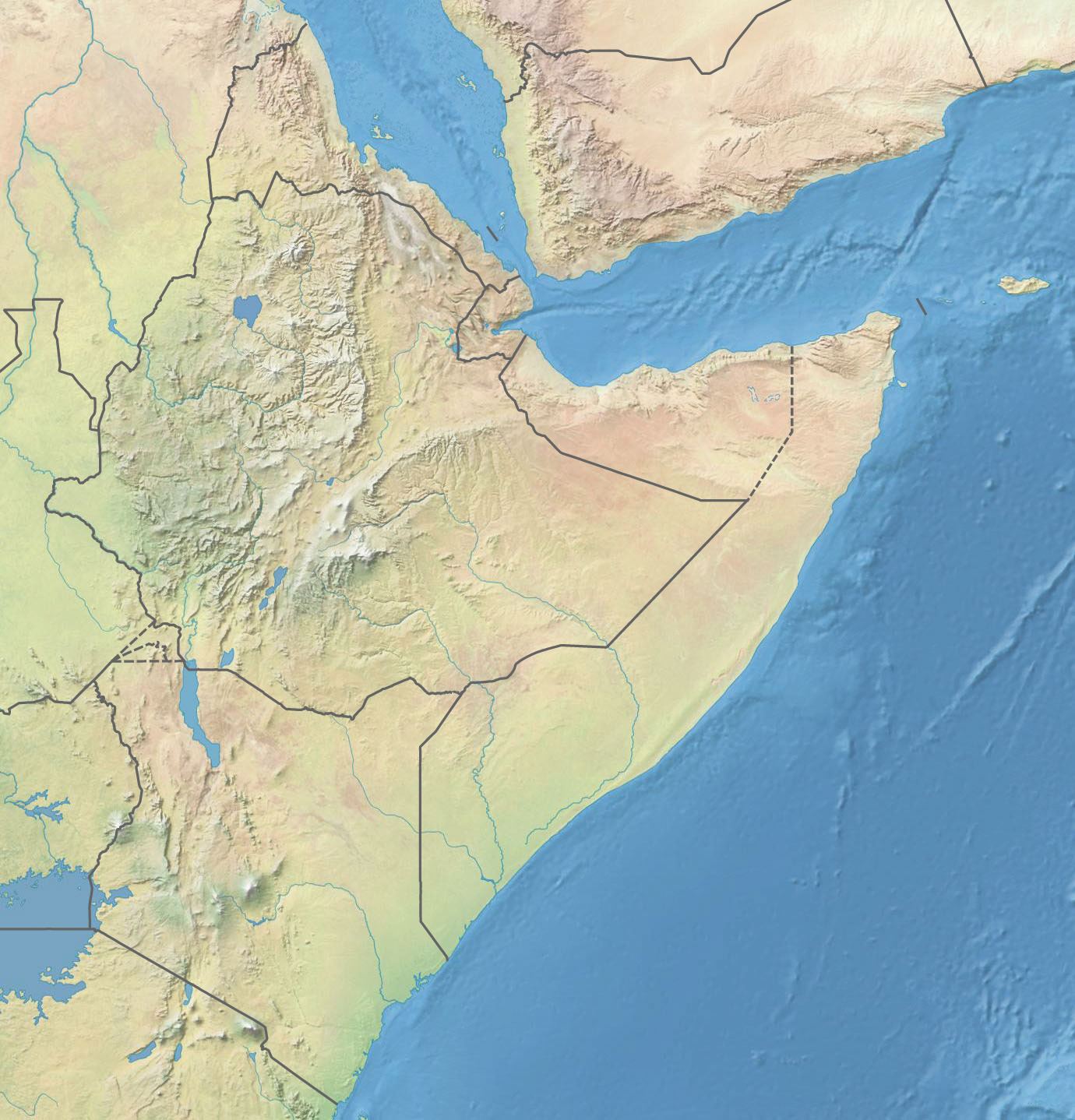
- Location within Somalia Location within Horn of Africa
- 11°17′N 49°11′E
- Type: Trading port
- Periods: Classical antiquity – Late antiquity
- Cultures: Proto-Somali
- Location: Bosaso, Bari, Puntland, Somalia

Mosylon (Note: Also known as Mosullon, Mosul, and Mosyllum/Mossylite.) (Ancient Greek: Μοσυλλόν and Μόσυλον), was an emporium and seaport situated in northern Somalia along the coast of the Gulf of Aden during Classical and Late Antiquity. According to Greco-Roman authors, it lay on a cape or promontory bearing the same name as the entrepôt. Mosylon was a major commercial hub of the lucrative spice trade, famous for its high-quality cinnamon known as Mosyllitic. This cinnamon was exported throughout the ancient world, and for this reason large ships were required at the port of Mosylon to carry it. Its origin and early history are unknown, although Mosylon is first attested in the 1st-century Periplus of the Erythraean Sea, Pliny the Elder’s Natural History, and Dioscorides’ De Materia Medica. However, its existence may predate these accounts, as it formed part of the Punt kingdom prior to its appearance in Greco-Roman sources.

The exact location of Mosylon has been a matter of dispute among historians and archaeologists. majority of scholars place it at the site that later became the city of Bosaso or its vicinity, while Georges Révoil identified it with Salweyn.

== Origin ==
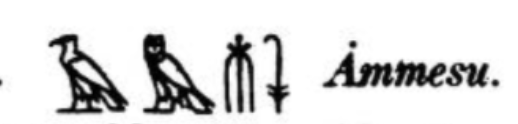
Hieroglyphic inscription representing the name of Mosylon in the temple of Karnak, as recorded by Pharaoh Thutmose III.

Mosylon was part of the ancient land of Punt, which flourished in the 3rd and 1st millennium BCE in the northern Somali Peninsula. During the reign of Pharaoh Thutmose III various places and settlements within Punt are recorded in an inscription at the Karnak temple. Among those topony is Ammessu, which according to the French Egyptologist Auguste Mariette corresponds to the promontory of Mosyllon/Mosylon or Moullou of antiquity.

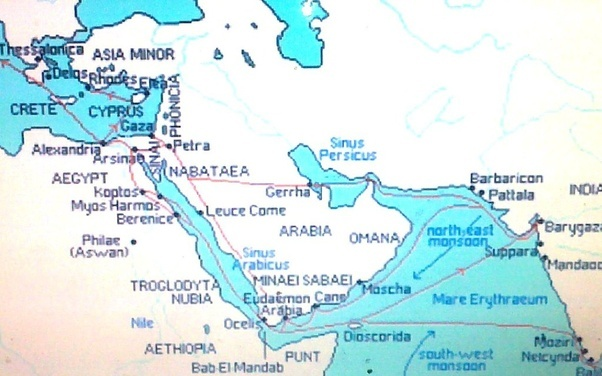
The supposed location of the ancient Punt polity.

Pliny in his Natural history reports that Sesostris’ furthest reach was Cape Mosyllum. When Mersa Gawasis was excavated a small stela with hieroglyphic inscription bearing the cartouches of Pharaoh Senusret I was discovered. The other inscription records an expedition to Punt or Bia/Bia-n-Punt. Sesostris is likely to be identified with Senusret I. The expedition to Punt was apparently an ideological mission intended to bring back Puntite products. Herodotus also records a similar account of Pharaoh Necho II (c. 600 BCE), who supposedly sent a non-military expedition down the Indian Ocean.Queen Hatshepsut’s voyage to Punt brought back spices, particularly cinnamon, along with goods such as fragrant gums, aromatic and incense resins (frankincense and myrrh). It was after the decline of the Punt civilization in the 1st century BCE (the last known reference to Punt dates to the reign of Ptolemy X Alexander I), that Mosylon emerged as an independent trading port at the beginning of the early 1st century CE.

== Greco-Roman sources ==
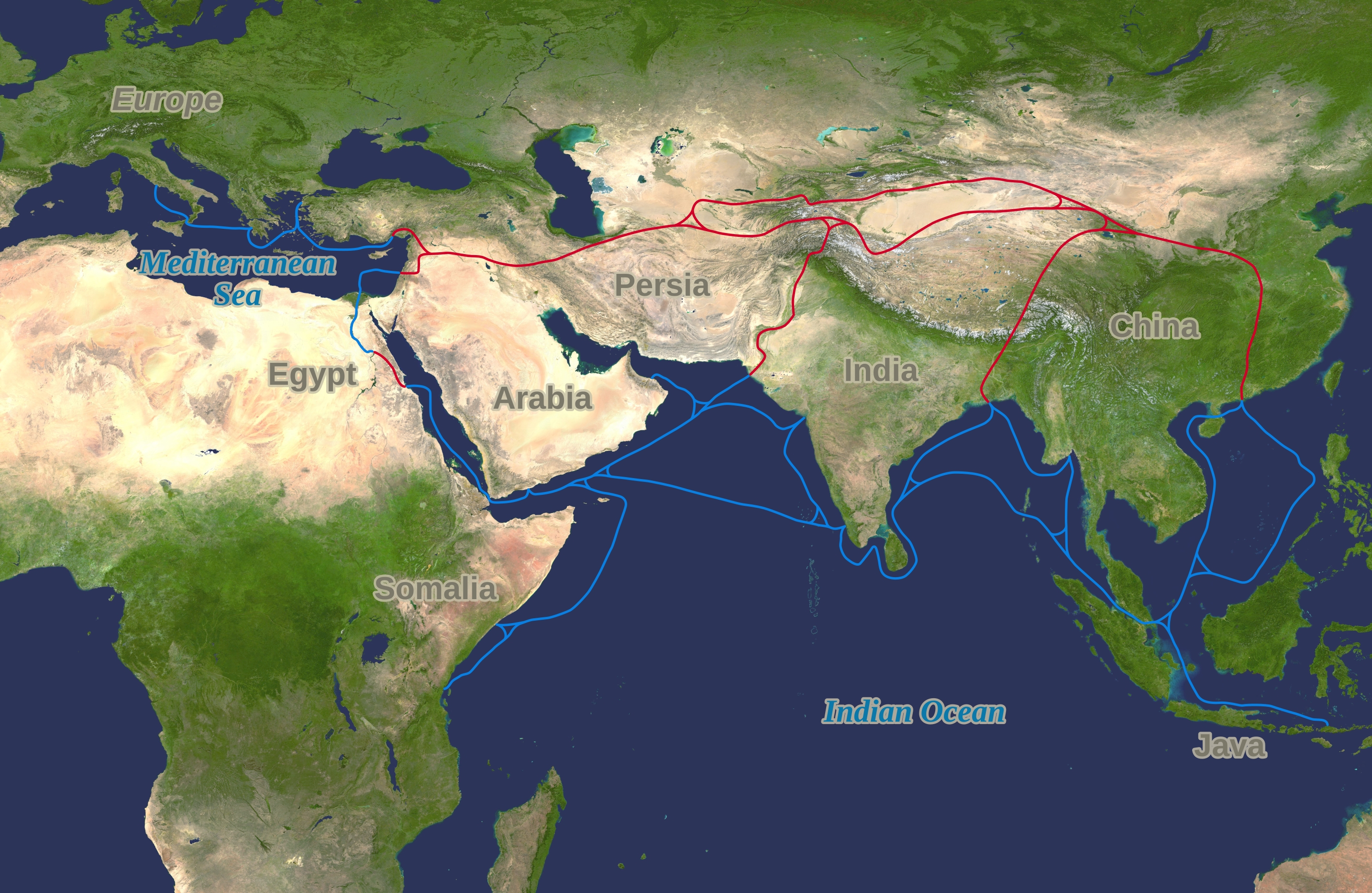
The spice trade routes linked ancient Somalia with India, Arabia, Egypt, the Mediterranean (Roman Empire), and Persia. Ports such as Mosylon and Aromata were crucial in supplying the native Somali spices and aromatic gums, as well as incense.

=== Classical era ===
Mosylon is first mentioned by Pedanius Dioscorides, author of De Materia Medica. Dioscorides notes that the best cinnamon (κιννάμωμον) comes from Mosylum/Mosylon, a port in Ethiopia (not to be confused with the modern nation). He also lists six varieties of cassia (κασσία), identifying the best for medicinal purposes as γίζιρ, while the others—such as ἄξυ (called δαφνῖτις by Alexandrian merchants), Μοσυλῖτις, ἀσύφη, κιττώ, and δάρκα—were of lower quality. Similarly, Pliny and Galen collectively confirm that the best cinnamon was called Mosyllum by the natives, which was also the name of the locality where it was obtained. There were several varieties of cinnamon, all named after their localities, with the yellow or mountain variety being particularly prized. For cassia, they distinguished multiple types and preserved their native names, including xylocassia (daphnitis), gizir, Mosyllitic bud (nasitos mosyllitikos), and the cheaper varieties kitto, moto, asyphe, and duaka. The detailed distinction between the different types of cinnamon and cassia suggests that the trade in these spices had been established for a long time (e.g. between the kingdom of Punt and ancient Egypt). From the accounts of classical authors, it is clear that all the varieties were believed to originate from the same region (today’s northeastern Somalia and not imported from anywhere else), with Mosyllum serving as the main marketplace for their collection and distribution.

The extreme rarity and high value of cinnamon meant that it was typically stored in the imperial Roman treasury. Cinnamon was among the most precious treasures of Queen Cleopatra of Ptolemaic Egypt. Galen distinguished several types of cinnamon and incorporated them into compound medicinal preparations used for treating and preventing illness in its early stages. He was also carrying out research into the therapeutic properties of Somali cinnamon when his medical storage facility in the Horrea Piperataria was destroyed by fire.

=== Description of Mosylon Cinnamon ===
Mosylitic cinnamon is considered the finest variety, either because of its resemblance to a type of cassia called Mosylitis or due to its association with that name.The best quality is described as fresh, dark, wine-coloured with an ash-grey tint, composed of slender branches with many knots and a strong, pleasant fragrance. Its quality is primarily determined by its aroma. The finest cinnamon has a scent similar to rue or cardamom. It is also regarded as superior when it has a strong, slightly pungent taste with warmth and mild saltiness. When handled, it should not feel rough, should not crumble into dust when broken, and should remain smooth between the knots.To test its quality, a small twig should be taken from the root, where evaluation is easiest. Since cinnamon is often found in mixed bundles of different grades, the strongest-smelling pieces are used as the standard of comparison, as their fragrance can overpower and mask the weaker varieties.

==== Periplus of the Erythraean Sea ====
The most detailed account of Mosyllum comes from the 1st-century Periplus of the Erythraean Sea, which describes it as follows:

§10 Beyond Mundus, sailing eastward for two or three days, one reaches Mosyllum, a market-town on a beach with a poor anchorage. Imported goods include items previously mentioned, along with silver plate, small amounts of iron, and glass. Exports from Mosyllum consist of a large quantity of cinnamon—requiring larger ships—fragrant gums, various spices, a small amount of tortoise shell, mocrotu incense (of lesser quality than that from Mundus), “far-side” frankincense, ivory, and small quantities of myrrh.

Other variations in the account note:

From Mundus, heading east for two to three days, Mosyllum lies on a beach with a poor harbor. The market here handles the same imported goods, plus silverware, iron (in small quantity), and precious stones. Exported items include large quantities of cassia (necessitating bigger ships), other spices and aromatics, a small amount of low-quality tortoise shell, mocrotu incense (poorer than that from Mundus), “far-side” frankincense, ivory, and myrrh, though these last are rare.

In Natural History of Pliny, Mosylon is describes as a port or harbour situated on a promontory or cape, and he identifies it as a place from which cinnamon was exported. A town called Baragaza was located along the coast beyond this point. King Juba II of Numidia believed Cape Mossylites as marking the beginning of the Atlantic Ocean, which could be navigated with north-west winds along the coast of Mauretania up to Gades.

==== Geography (Ptolemy) ====
Claudius Ptolemy refers to Mosyllum in Geography as a promontory and marketplace, giving its approximate coordinates as 79°00′ longitude and 9°00′ latitude. He situates it on the Bay of Avalites ( the modern Gulf of Aden).

=== Late antiquity ===
Gaius Julius Solinus, in De mirabilibus mundi (“On the Wonders of the World”), writes that the Azanian Sea (named after Azania) extends as far as the shores of the Ethiopians, while the Ethiopian Sea reaches the Mossylic promontory, from which the Atlantic Ocean begins. Stephanus of Byzantium in his Ethnica likewise mentions Mosyllum as either a cape and trading port of Ethiopia, or as a promontory and market of Ethiopia.

== Trade ==
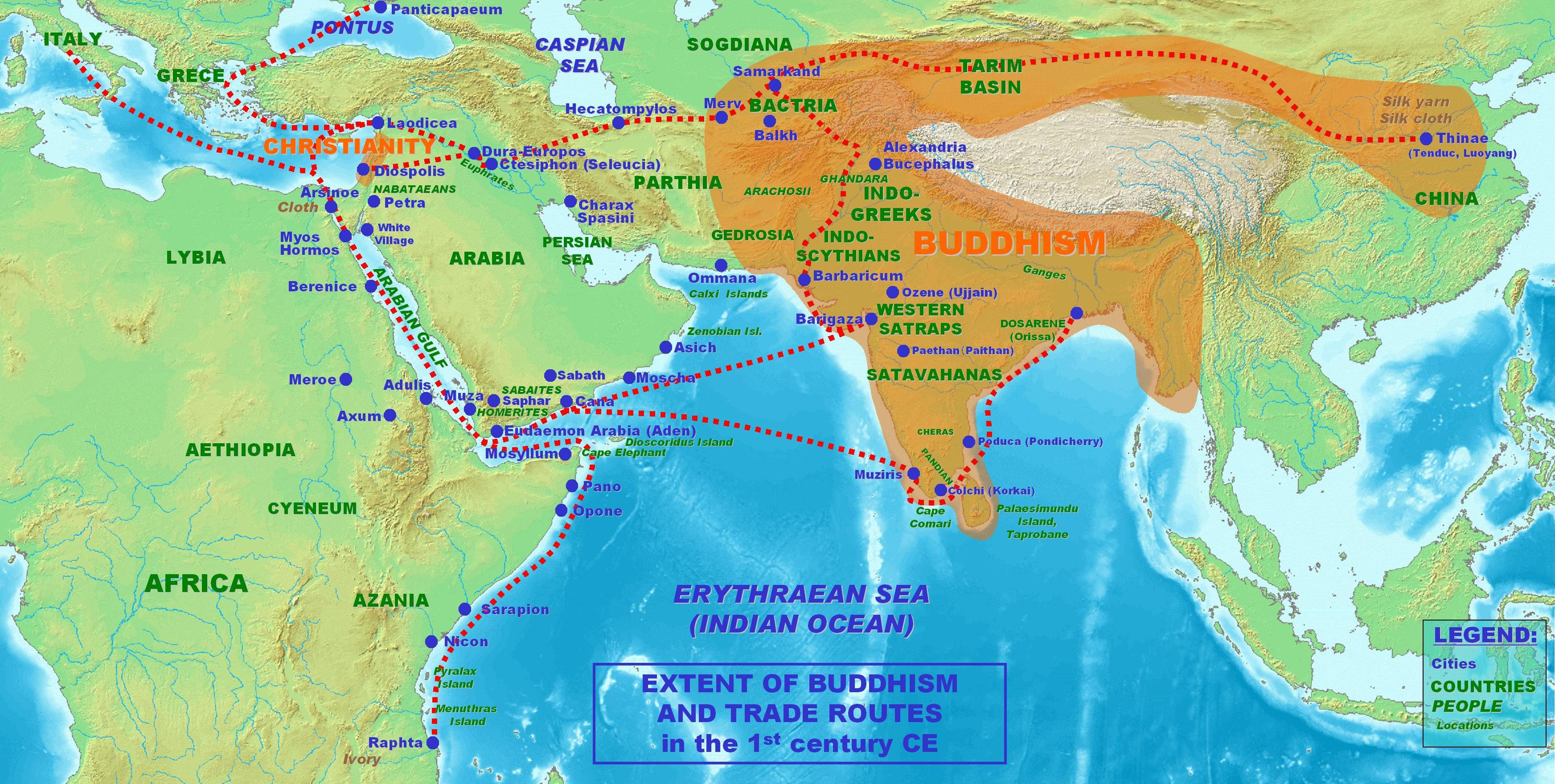
The trade routes along the Erythraean Sea at the turn of the 1st century CE, according to the author Periplus of the Erythraean Sea.

Mosylon connected both Roman Egypt and neighboring Arabia Felix with northern Somalia along the trade route of spices and incense, which passed through the Gulf of Aden onward to the Far East, the Indian subcontinent and Persia, and northward to Egypt, the Levant, Mesopotamia, Arabia and the Mediterranean world. The important known exports from Mosylon were cinnamon, the quantity of which was so great that larger vessels were required for its transport, according to the anonymous author of the Periplus, than at other ports in Africa. Fragrant gums, medicinal drugs (aromatics), tortoiseshell, incense and frankincense (brought from the interior), ivory, and small quantities of myrrh were among other commodities exported from Mosylon. Imports into Mosylon included flint glass and glass vessels from Egypt, unripe grapes from Diospolis (used in the production of grape products), unmilled cloths for the local market, corn, wine, tin (likely from Britain or Spain), tunics and finely made cloth from Arsinoe, iron, and small quantities of coinage.

== Location and Identification of Mosylon ==
The area of Bosaso is thought to be the probable location of ancient Mosylon. Excavations conducted in the late 19th century by the French explorer Georges Révoil at the site of Salweyn suggested that this location could be identified with Mosylon.

== See also ==
- Ancient Somali city state
- Somali maritime history
- History of Somalia
- Aromatica
