= Damo, Somalia =

Damo Daamo
- Village/hamlet
- Location within Somalia Location within Horn of Africa
- Coordinates: 11.835°N 51.235°E
- Country: Somalia
- Federal Member State: Puntland
- Region: Bari
- District: Alula District
- Time zone: UTC+3 (EAT)

Damo (Somali: Daamo) is a small coastal settlement in Alula District, Bari region,Puntland, northeastern Somalia, situated approximately 5 km west of Cape Guardafui and facing the Guardafui Channel. In 1975–76 Neville Chittick carried out surveys and excavated at Damo, which he identified with the ancient Aromata.Damo is one of at least four ancient towns along the Djibouti–Hafun coast confirmed to have existed 2,000 years ago or earlier.
