= Sarapion =

Ancient port town in modern Somalia

- Σαράπιον (Ancient Greek)
- Map related to the Periplus of the Erythraean Sea
- Type: Ancient port city
- Location: Mogadishu / Warsheikh, Somalia

History
- Built: 1st century AD

Sarapion (Ancient Greek: Σαράπιον, also spelled Serapion) was an ancient port city located in the Horn of Africa, believed to be the historical predecessor to Mogadishu.

== History ==
Sarapion is mentioned in Periplus of the Erythraean Sea, a travelogue from a Greek merchant in the 1st century CE.

Beyond Opone, the shore trending more toward the south, first there are the small and great bluffs of Azania; this coast is destitute of harbors, but there are places where ships can lie at anchor, the shore being abrupt; and this course is of six days, the direction being south-west. Then come the small and great beach for another six days' course and after that in order, the Courses of Azania, the first being called Sarapion and the next Nicon; and after that several rivers and other anchorages.
Periplus of the Erythraean Sea, Section 15

It briefly appears in Ptolemy's Geographia as one of the harbours a trader would encounter after sailing southernly on the Indian Ocean, passing along the way by the Market of Spices (Damo) and the emporium of Opone. The town is believed by modern scholars to have been positioned in the vicinity of Mogadishu and Warsheikh in present-day south-central Somalia.

== See also ==
- Maritime history of Somalia
