= Countries affected by the 2004 Indian Ocean earthquake and tsunami =

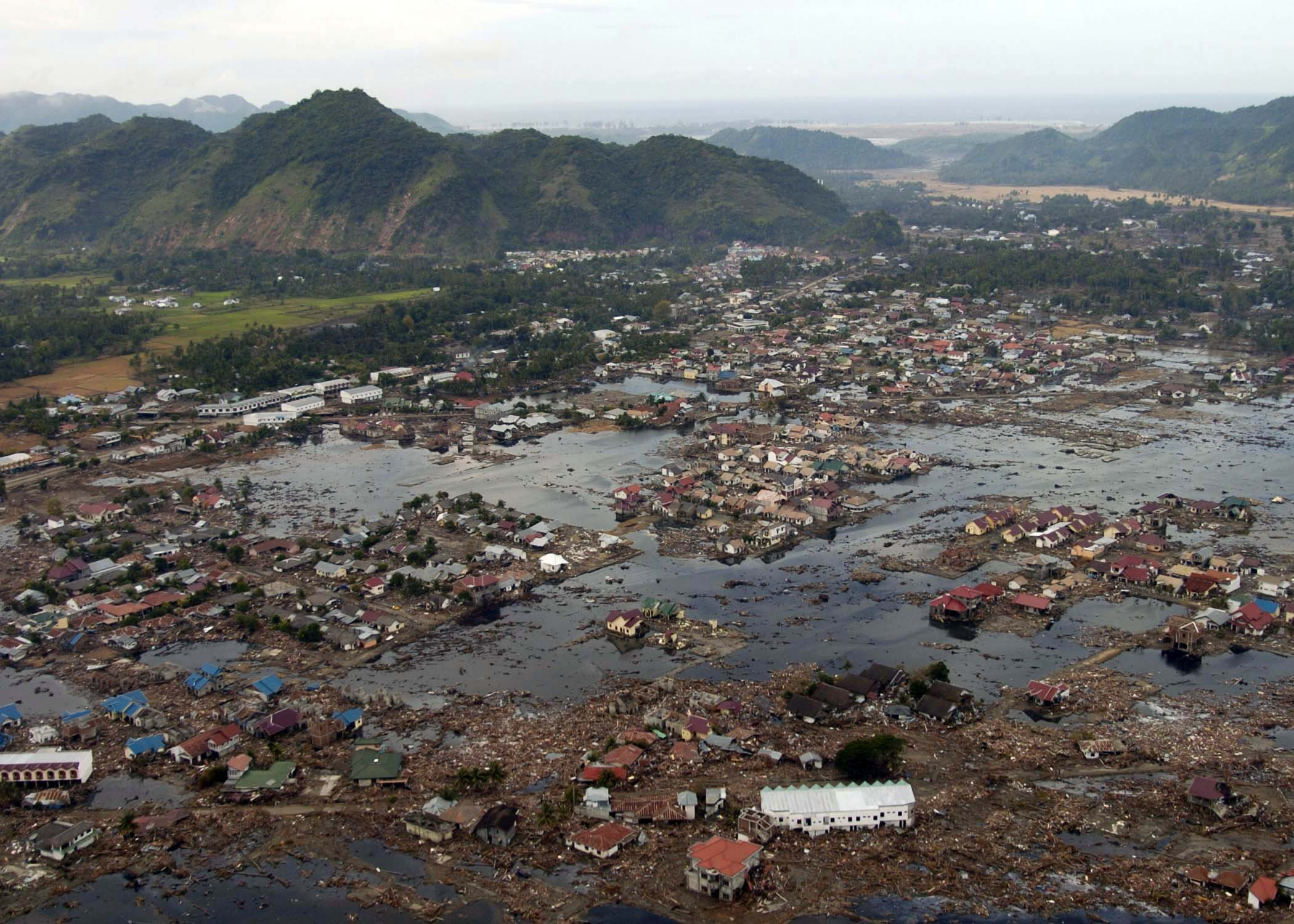
A village near the coast of Sumatra lies in ruins

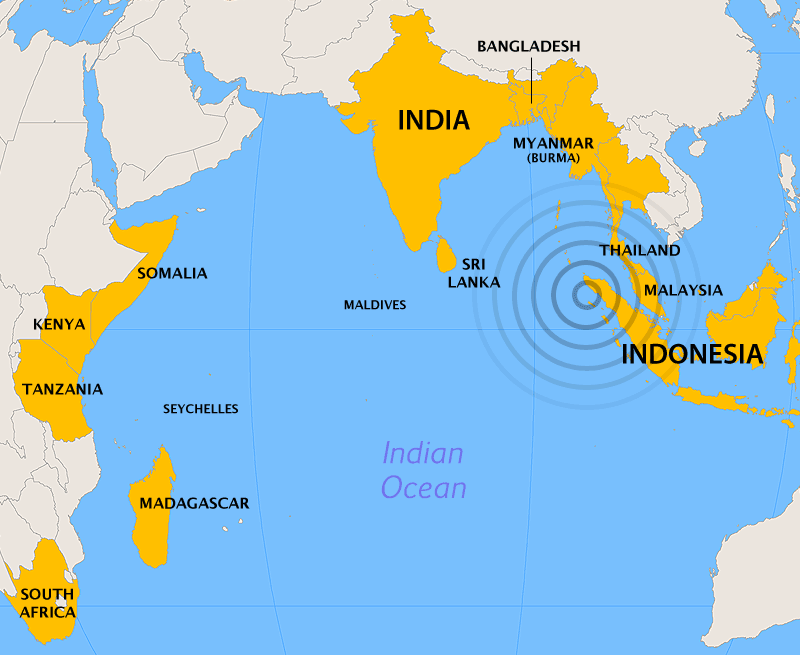
Countries directly affected by the earthquake and tsunami. Image as of a few days after the earthquake.

The 2004 Indian Ocean earthquake and tsunami occurred on Sunday, December 26, 2004. The earthquake itself, with a moment magnitude of around 9.2-9.3, devastated Aceh Province, Indonesia, while the tsunami affected countries all around the Indian Ocean. Nations that were affected are listed below in alphabetical order. For detailed information about each country affected by the earthquake and tsunami, see their articles. Countries with a smaller number of casualties, as well as those that lost citizens who were travelling abroad, are listed further on in the article.

== Countries suffering major casualties and damage ==
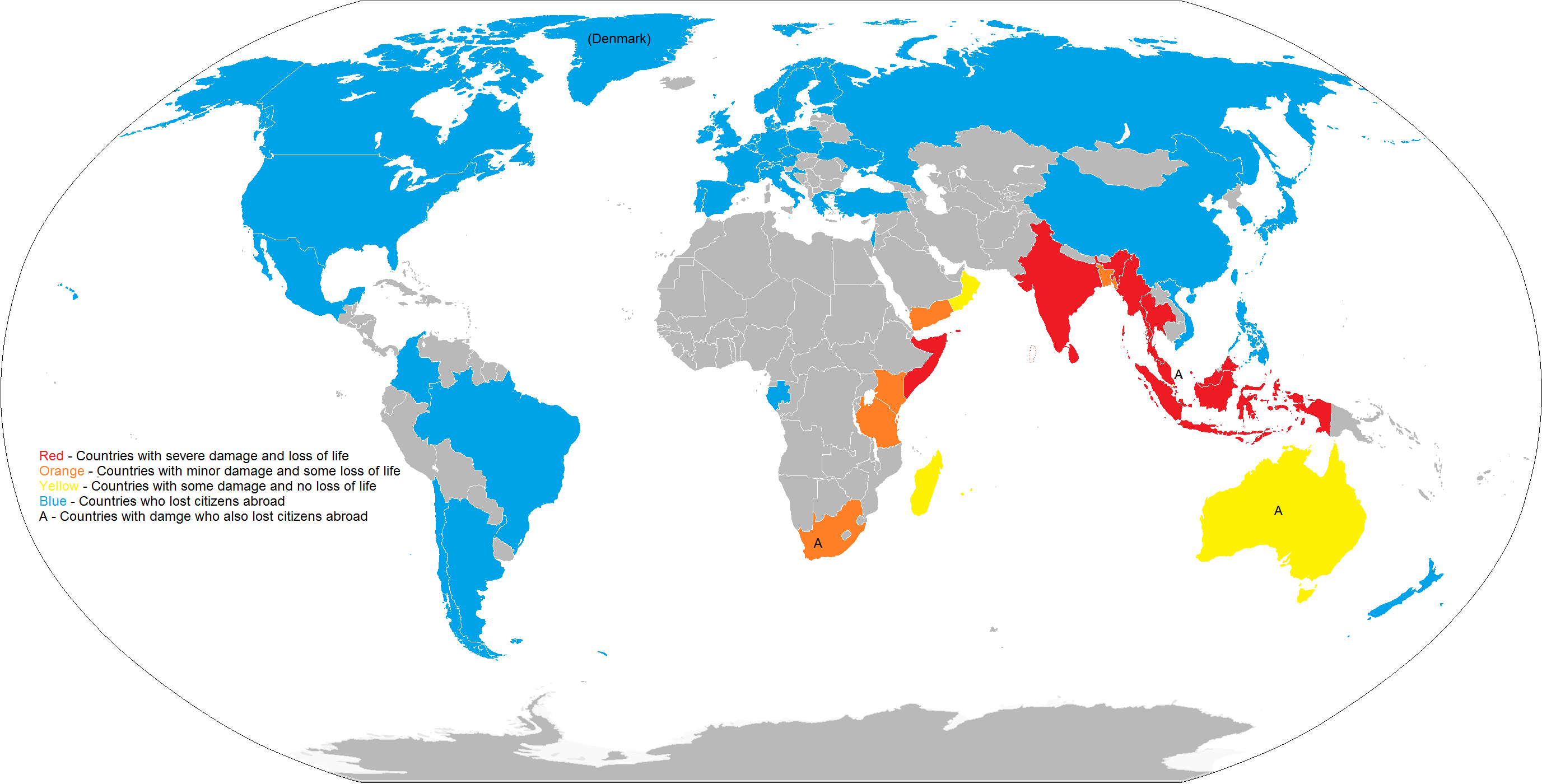
severe damage and loss of life moderate damage and some loss of life minor damage and no loss of life loss of citizens abroad A received damages and loss of citizens abroad

India

On 24 November 2014, 16,269 casualties were reported, most of them in the Indian states of Andhra Pradesh and Tamil Nadu. There were 5,640 people missing, nearly all of them on the Andaman and Nicobar Islands. The death and missing tolls later decreased by over 3,000 people.

Indonesia

Indonesia's Ministry of Health confirmed 131,028 deaths on June 18, 2005, mainly in the northern province Aceh of the island Sumatra, with another 37,000 people missing.

Malaysia

Despite its proximity to the incident, Malaysia escaped the kind of damage that struck countries thousands of miles further away, as most of its western coast is shielded by Sumatra. The estimated number of deaths is 75 with five others missing.

Maldives

In the Maldives, 82 people were killed while 26 were reported missing and presumed dead.

Myanmar

Independent media reported that 90 people were killed by the tsunami in Myanmar. The actual death toll was 59, according to Emergency Med International. Witnesses in Myanmar estimated up to 600 deaths.

Somalia

About 200 Somalis were killed and many more went missing after the strong waves struck the Somali coast. The disaster caused extensive property damage in the Horn of Africa country.

Sri Lanka

Sri Lankan authorities report 31,229 confirmed deaths, and 4,093 people missing. Other authorities are speaking from 38,940 combined dead and missing people. The south and east coasts were the worst hit. Nearly 2,000 of the dead were on the Queen of the Sea holiday train destroyed by the tsunami. One and a half million people were displaced from their homes, and many orphaned or separated from their families.

Thailand

The Thai government reports 5,395 confirmed deaths, 8,457 injuries and 2,817 missing on 20 June 2005. Damage was confined to the six southern provinces facing the Andaman Sea. The Thai government was keen to point out that the rest of the country was operating normally, and that even some resorts in the south had re-opened.

== Countries suffering some casualties and damage ==
Bangladesh	Two people, a four-year-old boy and his younger brother, were killed when their boat capsized off the coast of Barisal.
Kenya	Waves struck Kenya, causing some minor damage. One person was reported to have drowned at Watamu, near Mombasa.
Seychelles	Three people were declared killed, and six people were missing. A major bridge in Victoria was destroyed.
South Africa	One boy died after swimming in the Quinera River at Gonubie, close to East London; an adult died at the Blue Horizon Bay near Port Elizabeth, the furthest point from the epicenter of the earthquake where a tsunami-related death was reported. General observations: Ocean level variance two to three meters outside normal reported in KwaZulu-Natal and Eastern Cape, and a surge of 1.5 m was observed as far as Struisbaai in the Western Cape, 8500 km from the epicentre of the earthquake. Some steps were taken in South Africa to warn ports and disaster management centers, although full details are not public. Large concrete blocks were uprooted in East London harbor, where boats also broke from their moorings. Boats and cars were submerged at the Algoa Bay Yacht Club in Port Elizabeth harbor. Durban harbor, Africa's busiest general cargo port and home to the largest and busiest container terminal in the Southern Hemisphere, was closed for some time on 27 December because of unusually strong surges across the entrance channel.
Tanzania	Ten people were killed, and an unknown number of people were missing. An oil tanker temporarily ran aground in Dar es Salaam harbor, damaging an oil pipeline.
Yemen	One child was killed on Socotra Island.

== Countries suffering damage only ==
Australia	Tremors felt along the north-western coast, with some minor flooding. Seas off Western Australia reportedly surged between Geraldton (425 km north of Perth) and Busselton (230 km south of Perth); several boats were ripped from their moorings, and a father and son in a boat were washed out to sea, but were later rescued. No direct casualties were reported within Australia. Despite initial worries about Cocos (Keeling) Islands, no casualties were reported. People swimming at Christmas Island were sucked 150m out to sea, but were safely carried back to shore soon thereafter. At roughly 2 pm that day, a single wave surged (between 5 and 10 m beyond the normal high-water point) on Mullaloo Beach, Perth, briefly startling and engulfing several people. No injuries were reported.
Madagascar	Flooding in low-lying coastal districts. No reported casualties. Waves, reported variously between 1.6 and 10 metres in height, swept through southeastern coastal areas. Over a thousand locals were displaced. Problems were further exacerbated by the approach of Cyclone Chambo.
Mauritius	No reports of casualties; however, a village in the north of the island was completely submerged. Police issued warnings to bathers to stay out of the water, although this had the opposite effect, with crowds thronging the beaches to watch the phenomenon. Speculation is that coral reefs surrounding much of the island protected the coastline.
Oman	Waves hit coastline; no casualties.
France	Over 200 boats sunk in Réunion; damage to port infrastructure estimated at over €500,000.

== Countries/territories that lost citizens while abroad ==
Country/Territory	Deaths	Per million; inhabitants
Argentina	2	0.05
Australia	26	1.3
Austria	86	10.52
Belgium	11	1.06
Brazil	2	0.01
Canada	15	0.47
Chile	2	0.12
China	3	0.002
Colombia	1	0.02
Croatia	1	0.23
Czech Republic	8	0.78
Denmark	45	8.33
Estonia	3	2.2
Finland	179	34.24
France	542	8.64
Gabon	1	0.71
Germany	539	6.53
Hong Kong	38	5.6
Ireland	4	0.98
Israel	6	0.88
Italy	54	0.94
Japan	37	0.29
Luxembourg	2	4.37
Malaysia	9	0.36
Malta	1	2.49
Mexico	2	0.02
Netherlands	36	2.21
New Zealand	7	1.71
Norway	84	18.29
Philippines	8	0.09
Poland	1	0.03
Portugal	5	0.48
Russia	9	0.06
Saudi Arabia	1	0.04
Singapore	9	2.16
South Africa	17	0.35
South Korea	17	0.35
Spain	2	0.05
Sweden	543	60.37
Switzerland	113	15.29
Taiwan	2	0.09
Turkey	1	0.01
United Kingdom	143	2.38
Ukraine	38	0.8
United States	33	0.11
Vietnam	1	0.01
Total	2,775	0.86

=== A – J ===
Argentina	Two Argentinians died in Krabi, Thailand, according to the Ministry of Foreign Affairs.
Australia	Twenty-six Australians (23 in Thailand and three in Sri Lanka) were confirmed to have lost their lives. Earlier fears that several hundred Australians may have died were revised: Australian Federal Police Commissioner Mick Keelty put the likely death toll at between 30 and 100, and other sources said the final number will be about 50. AFL player Troy Broadbridge, who was on his honeymoon with his wife Trisha Silvers, was confirmed as one of the dead. Australians were asked to observe a minute's silence at 11:59 am.
Austria	Eighty-six Austrians were confirmed dead (85 in Thailand and one in Sri Lanka).
Belgium	Eleven Belgian tourists were confirmed killed in Thailand.
Brazil	The Brazilian diplomat Lys Amayo de Benedek D'Avola and her 10-year-old son died in Phi Phi, Thailand. At first, a list of about 300 people who were unaccounted for was put together. One by one, however, all the people were found, either in hospitals, already home or in other countries.
Canada	Fifteen Canadians were confirmed dead, as well as another six were left missing. Five of the missing are presumed dead.
Chile	One dead and another injured in Phi Phi Islands, Thailand.
China	Three tourists from Mainland China confirmed dead, 15 injured in Thailand.
Colombia	An eighteen-month-old baby was reported dead in Thailand.
Croatia	A 3-year-old girl from Croatia died in Thailand.
Czech Republic	Seven dead (six in Thailand, one in Sri Lanka); five injured in Thailand including supermodel Petra Němcová.
Denmark	There were 45 people dead and 1 listed as missing (as of July 18, 2005). Of the dead, 43 died in Thailand. A young female tourist and a Danish resident died in Sri Lanka.
Estonia	Three confirmed dead in Thailand.
Finland	There were 179 deceased, among them musician Aki Sirkesalo. Among them, 177 died in Thailand, 1 in Sri Lanka and 1 in Finland after being severely injured in Thailand.
France	There were 542 confirmed dead. About 50,000 French citizens were in the region when the tsunami hit, according to the French Ministry of Foreign Affairs.
Germany	There were 539 confirmed dead.
Greece	One person lightly injured in Phuket, according to the Ministry of Foreign Affairs.
Hong Kong (PRC)	There were 38 residents confirmed dead with 2 more missing in Thailand.
Hungary	Eight persons injured.
Ireland	Four persons confirmed dead.
Israel	Six Israelis were killed, one missing from the Thai resort of Phuket, and presumed dead.
Italy	There were 54 Italians who died in the disaster, mostly in Thailand. About 10,000 to 12,000 Italian citizens were in the region, according to the Italian Ministry of Foreign Affairs.
Japan	There were 37 confirmed deaths.

=== K – R ===
Luxembourg	A woman and her daughter were confirmed dead. Approximately 400 people were in the affected region according to the government.
Malaysia	Apart from the casualties on Malaysian soil, there are further 6 Malaysian vacationers confirmed dead and 5 were missing in Phuket, Thailand, 1 was confirmed dead in Sri Lanka, 2 Malaysian students reported dead in Banda Aceh, Indonesia and 10 Malaysians were missing in Chennai, India. 3 Malaysians who were on holiday in Mauritius were found safe after initially being reported missing.
Malta	One woman died.
Mexico	Two deaths and one person missing.
Netherlands	There are currently 36 confirmed Dutch deaths. The last official victim was identified on August 3, 2005. About 5 people remain unaccounted for in the sense that it is not clear if they were in the disaster area at the time of the tsunami. These are people who had not been in touch with family or friends in the Netherlands for some time before the tsunami, and were filed as "regular missing persons".
New Zealand	The Foreign Affairs Ministry confirmed 6 New Zealand deaths including an elderly New Zealand-born woman, who held Canadian citizenship.
Norway	There were 84 deaths, among them jazz musician Sigurd Køhn.
Philippines	Eight people have been reported dead and several were injured, in Phuket, Thailand.
Poland	According to Polish Ministry of Foreign Affairs one Polish tourist died and 12 people were missing. Three people were hospitalised in Phuket and Krabi. The number of Polish tourists in the affected areas was estimated to be around 2,000.
Portugal	Five reported dead and 4 still missing, from a total of 230 Portuguese thought to be in the region at the time, according to the Ministry of Foreign Affairs.
Romania	The deaths of two Romanian tourists in Phuket, Thailand were initially reported, but they were later found safe. It is estimated that over 20 Romanian tourists were in the affected region, but according to Gaginschi Cristian, representative of the Ministry of Foreign Affairs, there is no evidence that any Romanian citizen was affected by the earthquake.
Russia	At least 2 died in Phuket, Thailand, and 7 are missing, according to the Russian Embassy. About 800 Russian tourists were in Phuket alone. Around 250 Russian tourists were in Sri Lanka, all of whom are safe.

=== S – Z ===
Singapore	Seventeen dead and two missing.
Saudi Arabia	One Saudi national killed in Kerala, India.
South Africa	Casualties in South East Asia: Fourteen South Africans were confirmed dead. All these 14 people died in Phuket or on the Phi Phi Islands, Thailand. By 26 January 2005 the South African Department of International Relations and Cooperation had traced the whereabouts of all 2,896 South Africans who were known to have been in South East Asia at the time of the disaster. This includes those confirmed dead.
South Korea	The Ministry of Foreign Affairs reported 17 dead and 3 missing.
Spain	According to the Ministry of Foreign Affairs, 2 confirmed dead, both in Khao Lak beach, in Phuket, Thailand.
Sweden	Sweden was likely the most seriously affected country outside of the disaster area. According to Swedish authorities, some 20,000–30,000 citizens were in the tsunami-affected areas at the time, mainly in Thai resorts. 543 persons were reported deceased, and over 1,500 in need of emergency medical help and/or transportation home. 528 bodies had been identified as of May 16, 2006. The Swedish government and especially the minister for foreign affairs Laila Freivalds was heavily criticized for being slow to act.
Switzerland	Over 2,200 Swiss nationals are estimated to have been in the affected area at the time of disaster. 106 have been confirmed as deceased by the Department of Foreign Affairs, and many more injured; 6 persons are still missing (as of 20 November 2005).
Taiwan	Three confirmed dead, and many injured. Thirty-five fishing boats from Taiwan in Phuket, Thailand, were beached and damaged; sailors suffered minor injuries.
Turkey	According to the Ministry of Foreign Affairs of Turkey, one Turkish national killed in Phuket, Thailand. A plane, which was sent to Maldives by Turkish government to gather all the Turks in the region, returned with only 13 survivors and AKUT, a well-known Turkish search and rescue organisation that was taken there by the plane. Turkish GSM operator Turkcell announced that signals from 2,500 of its subscribers were received in the area, meaning at least 2,500 Turks were present when the disaster occurred.
Ukraine	According to the Ukrainian government, 38 citizens died, including a United Nations official.
United Kingdom	On 26 December over 10,000 British holidaymakers were estimated to have been in the region. There are 149 Britons confirmed dead and 1 missing including arts administrator and manager Jane Attenborough.
United States	The US State Department reports 18 dead and 15 missing, presumed dead. Nine died in Sri Lanka and 24 in Thailand. The State Department was working through a list of 18 unaccounted for as of February 8. It is understood that the U.S./UK military installation at the Indian Ocean island of Diego Garcia was unaffected by the disaster.
Vietnam	One Vietnamese national confirmed dead and three injured in Thailand. Dozens of Vietnamese shopkeepers in the area were affected.
