= Ras Hafun =

Easternmost point of Africa, in Somalia

Ras Hafun رأس حافون Cape Hafun
- Cape
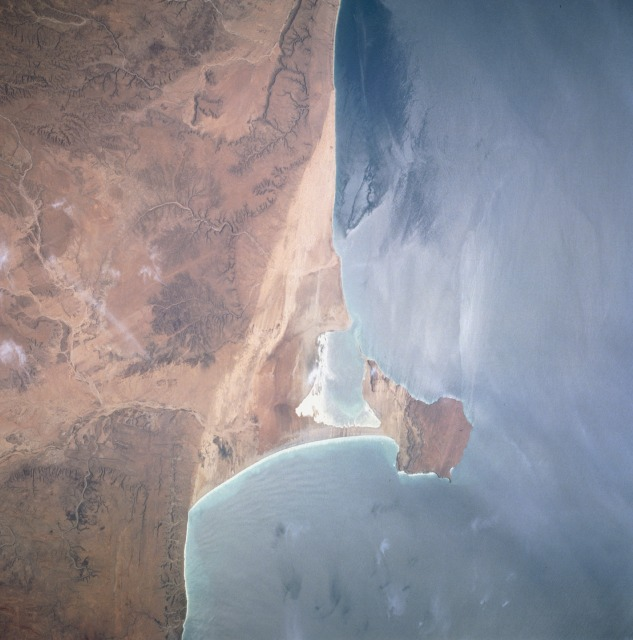
- Hafun juts out to the east of the mid-Bari region

- Location within Somalia
- Coordinates: 10°25′0″N 51°16′0″E
- Location: Horn of Africa

Area
  - Total: 2,571 km^{2} (993 sq mi)

Dimensions
  - Length: 1,100 m (3,600 ft)

Ras Hafun (Somali: Ras Xaafuun, Arabic: رأس حافون, Italian: Capo Hafun), also known as Cape Hafun, is a promontory in the northeastern Bari region of the Puntland state in Somalia.

== Geography ==
Jutting out into the Guardafui Channel, the promontory constitutes the easternmost point of mainland Africa. The area is situated near the Cape Guardafui headland. It is joined to the mainland at the town of Foar, by a sand spit 20 km (12 miles) long, 1–3 km (0.6–1.9 miles) in width, and 5 m (16 ft) above sea level. The fishing town of Hafun is located on the promontory, 2 km (1.2 miles) east of the sand spit. Ras Hafun and its line of latitude separate the Guardafui Channel to its north, from the Somali Sea to its south.

=== Environment ===
The site is characterised by a rocky coastline, sandy beaches and mangroves, backed inland by lowland plains supporting an arid savanna landscape with low, woody vegetation. It has been designated an Important Bird Area (IBA) by BirdLife International because it supports significant populations of Somali pigeons, Forbes-Watson's swifts, eastern chanting goshawks, Somali fiscals, lesser hoopoe-larks, Somali larks, Somali starlings, Somali wheatears and Somali sparrows.

== History ==
=== Antiquity and Middle Ages ===
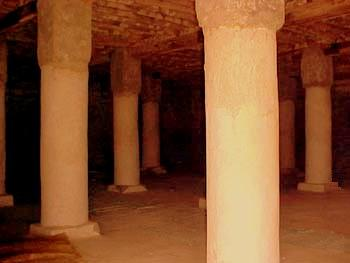
17th-century Masjid in Hafun.

Ras Hafun is home to numerous ancient structures and ruins. The peninsula is believed to be the location of the old trade emporium of Opone. The latter is mentioned in the anonymous Periplus of the Erythraean Sea, written in the first century CE. Opone is described therein as a busy port city, strategically located on the trade route that spanned the length of the Indian Ocean's rim. Merchants from as far afield as Indonesia and Malaysia passed through the settlement. As early as 50 CE, the area was well known as a center for the cinnamon trade, along with the barter of cloves and other spices, ivory, exotic animal skins and incense.

In the 1970s, a Somali-British archaeological expedition in Hafun and other parts of northern Somalia, led by Neville Chittick, recovered numerous examples of historical artefacts and structures, including ancient coins, Roman pottery, drystone buildings, cairns, masjids, walled enclosures, standing stones and platform monuments. Many of the finds were of pre-Islamic origin and associated with city-states and trading centers described in ancient documents. The Damo site, in particular, was suggested by Chittick to correspond with the Periplus' "Market and Cape of Spices". Some of the smaller artefacts that the company found were subsequently deposited for preservation at the British National Museum.

A later expedition in Hafun, led by an archaeological team with the University of Michigan, excavated Ancient Egyptian, Roman and Persian Gulf pottery. In the 1980s, the British Institute in Eastern Africa also recovered pre-Islamic Partho-Sassanid ceramics from the peninsula, which were dated to the first century BCE and the second through fifth centuries CE.

Archaeological excavations at the western Hafun site have yielded ceramics from ancient kingdoms in the Nile Valley, Near East, Persia and Mesopotamia, as well as some sherds of possible derivation from the Indian subcontinent. Among this ware is a late Ptolemaic lamp fragment, Parthian glazed sherds, and Hellenistic lagynos wares. Smith and Wright have dated the finds to sometime between the 1st century BCE and the early first century CE. Additionally, some ceramics affiliated with green glazed ware from Sohar on the Omani littoral have also been found in the area. These pieces have been dated to between the 1st century BC and the 5th century BCE.

Hafun is also home to an ancient necropolis. Similar historical structured areas exist in various other parts of the country.

=== Early modern and present ===
During the pre-independence period, Hafun was governed by the Majeerteen Sultanate (Migiurtinia) and was the seat of the polity's capital, Alula. It later formed a part of Italian Somaliland, when the area was known as Dante.

In December 2004, Hafun was struck by a tsunami caused by the 2004 Indian Ocean earthquake. It was the most affected area on the continent, and the only location west of the Indian subcontinent where the waves pulled away from the shore before rushing in.

In November 2020, Hafun was struck directly by Cyclone Gati as a Category 2 equivalent cyclone or a Very Severe Cyclonic Storm in Indian Ocean scale with windspeeds of 165 kmph and 140 kmph. This remains the strongest cyclone to hit the Horn of Africa and the nation of Somalia since reliable records began.

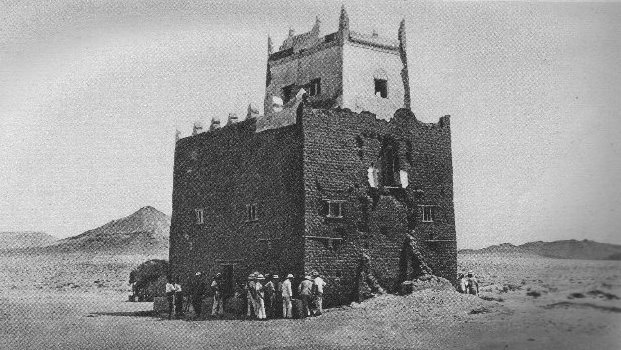
One of the forts of the Majeerteen Sultanate (Migiurtinia) in Hafun.

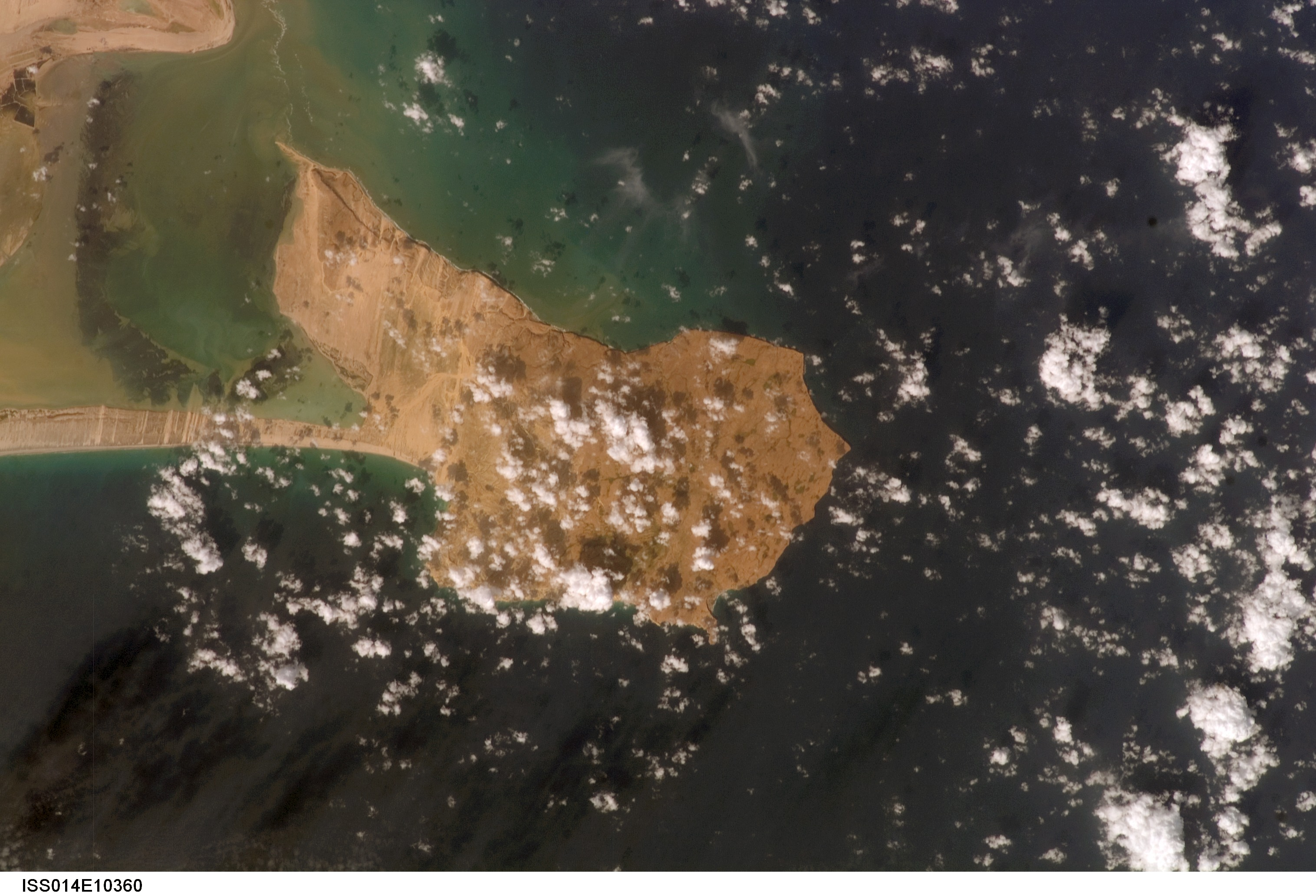
Ras Hafun viewed from the International Space Station in 2006.

== See also ==
- Hafun District
- Hafun Salt Factory
- Puntland
- Ras Bar Balla
- Ras Feeluk
- SS Jeddah, a passenger steamship that was abandoned by its crew off Ras Hafun in 1880
- Tombolo
