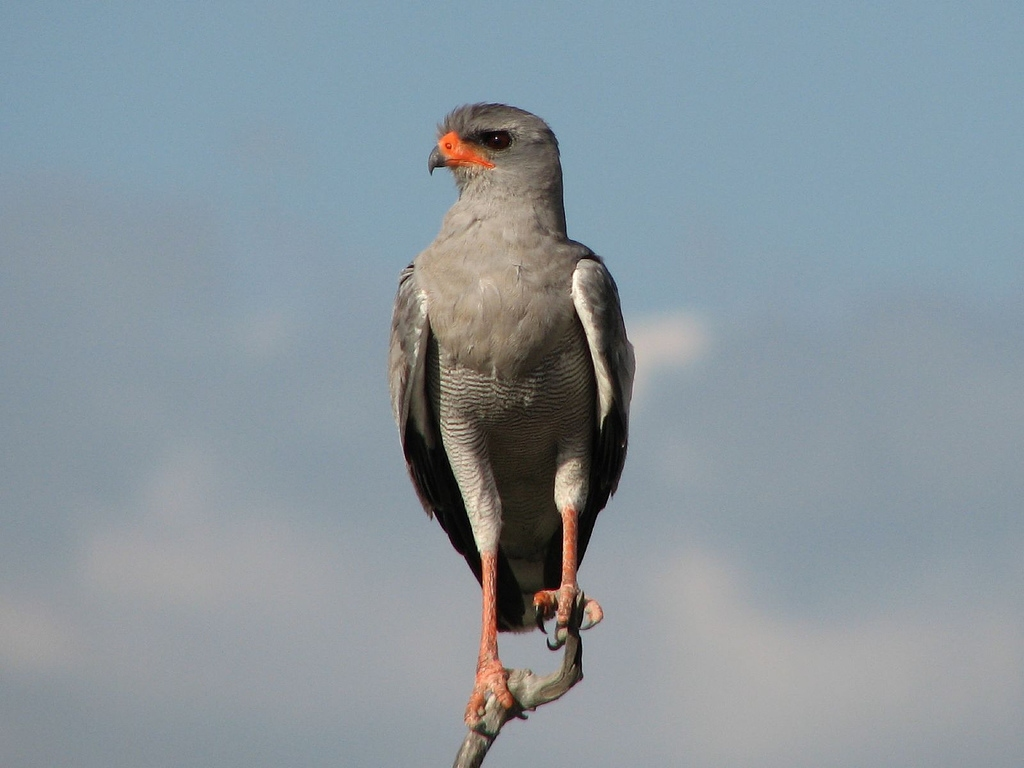
- Pale chanting goshawk (Melierax canorus)

Scientific classification
- Kingdom: Animalia
- Phylum: Chordata
- Class: Aves
- Order: Accipitriformes
- Family: Accipitridae
- Subfamily: Accipitrinae
- Genus: Melierax; G.R. Gray, 1840

Type species
- Falco musicus Daudin, 1800

= Melierax =

Genus of birds

Melierax is a genus of bird of prey in the family Accipitridae. Established by George Robert Gray in 1840, it contains the following species:

Genus Melierax – G.R. Gray, 1840 – three species
Common name	Scientific name and subspecies	Range	Size and ecology	IUCN status and estimated population
Dark chanting goshawk	Melierax metabates Heuglin, 1861 Five subspecies: M. m. metabates: Senegal and the Gambia east to Ethiopia, south to the Democratic Republic of the Congo and northern Tanzania.; M. m. neumanni: Mali east to northern Sudan.; M. m. theresae: south west Morocco.; M. m. ignoscens: South western Arabia, i.e. south western Saudi Arabia and western Yemen.; M. m. mechowi: south eastern Gabon to Angola, south Tanzania south to northern Namibia and north eastern South Africa.	sub-Saharan Africa, but avoids the rainforest of the Congo basin and the far south	Size: 45cm Habitat: savannah, open woodland Diet: birds, small mammals, reptiles	LC
Pale chanting goshawk	Melierax canorus (Thunberg, 1799) Two subspecies: M. c. argentior - Clancey, 1960; M. c. canorus - (Thunberg, 1799)	South Africa	Size: 55cm Habitat: desert Diet: small mammals and reptiles	LC
Eastern chanting goshawk	Melierax poliopterus Cabanis, 1868	East Africa	Size: 49 to 55cm Habitat: semi-desert, grassland Diet: lizards, smaller birds, insects	LC

The name Melierax is a combination of the Greek words melos, meaning "song" and hierax, meaning "hawk".
