= Neville Chittick =

British scholar and archaeologist

- Born: Neville H. Chittick; 18 September 1923; Hove, Sussex
- Died: July 27, 1984 (aged 60); Cambridge
- Occupation: archaeologist
- Writing career
- Notable work: An Archaeological Reconnaissance of the Horn: The British-Somali Expedition (1975)

Hubert Neville Chittick (18 September 1923 – July 27, 1984) was a British archaeologist and African studies scholar. Chittick specialized in the pre-colonial cultures of East and Northeast Africa, and also devoted various works to the Swahili Coast. He was the director of the British Institute of Eastern Africa from 1961 to 1983.

== Biography ==
Chittick was born in 1923 in Hove, Sussex. As an undergraduate in Cambridge, he first studied law and was admitted as a barrister, but never practiced this profession.

As an aspiring archaeologist, he initially worked with Max Mallowan as general field assistant in Nimrud in 1951. From 1952 to 1955 he served as curator of museums in the Sudan Antiquities Service under Peter Shinnie. In 1957 he was elected a Fellow of the Society of Antiquaries. In the same year he moved to Tanganyika, serving as the colonial territory's first Conservator of Antiquities until the country's independence in 1961.

In 1961, Chittick was appointed the first Director of the British Institute of History and Archeology in Eastern Africa in Dar es Salaam. Under his leadership the institute's headquarters was relocated to Nairobi, Kenya in 1964 and the institute was renamed to "British Institute in Eastern Africa" (BIEA) in 1970. In 1966 he established Azania, journal on archaeological research in Africa, and edited its first eighteen volumes. Chittick's research focused on the archaeology of the East African coast (from the Horn of Africa to southern Tanzania) before the arrival of the Portuguese around 1500. He worked as director of the BIEA until 1983. In the 1984 Birthday Honours, Chittick was awarded the title of Officer of the Order of the British Empire (O.B.E.) "for services to the archaeology and ethnohistory of East Africa".

A few months after his retirement, Chittick died in Cambridge in 1984. He is buried in the Parish of the Ascension Burial Ground.

== Expeditions ==
Chittick's expeditions and residence on the Swahili Coast produced a body of research into the pre-colonial sites Kilwa Kisiwani and the port of Manda Island.

He also wrote extensively on the archaeology of ancient civilizations in the more northerly Horn of Africa, such as the Axumite Empire and the Hafun city-states.

From late October to early December 1975, at the invitation of the Somali government, Chittick led a British-Somali archaeological expedition in the northern half of Somalia. Members of the party included the Director of the Somali National Museum in Mogadishu, Sa'id Ahmad Warsame, as well as 'Ali 'Abd al-Rahman and Fabby Nielson. Particular emphasis was placed on the area near Cape Guardafui in the far northeast. Financed by the Somali authorities, the reconnaissance mission found numerous examples of historical artefacts and structures, including ancient coins, Roman pottery, drystone buildings, cairns, mosques, walled enclosures, standing stones and platform monuments. Many of the finds were of pre-Islamic origin and associated with ancient settlements described by the 1st century Periplus of the Erythraean Sea, among other documents. Based on his discoveries, Chittick suggested in particular that the Damo site in the Hafun peninsula likely corresponded with the Periplus' "Market and Cape of Spices". Some of the smaller artefacts that Chittick's company found were later deposited for preservation at the British National Museum.
