= Hafun District =

- District
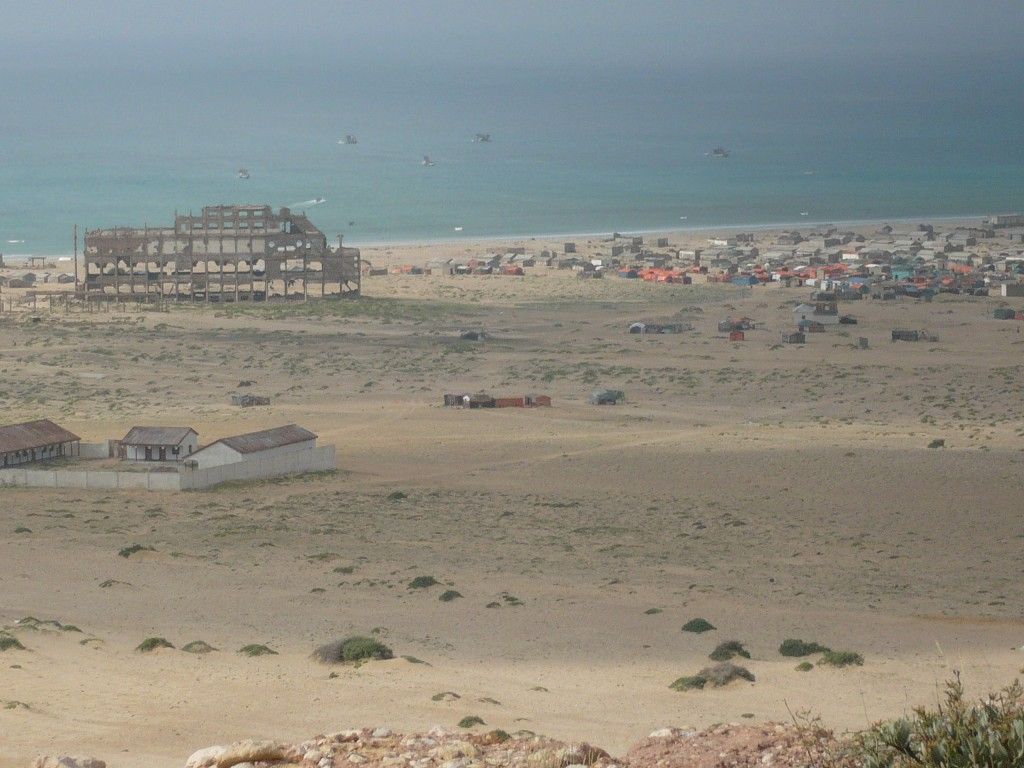
- Remains of the Hafun Salt Factory in the outskirts of Hafun, Somalia, 2007.
- Country: Somalia: Puntland
- Region: Bari
- Capital: Hafun
- Time zone: UTC+3 (EAT)

Hafun District is a district in the northeastern Bari or Puntland Region of Somalia. It faces the Guardafui Channel and its capital is Hafun.

== See also ==
- Horn of Africa
- Ras Hafun
