= Hafun Salt Factory =

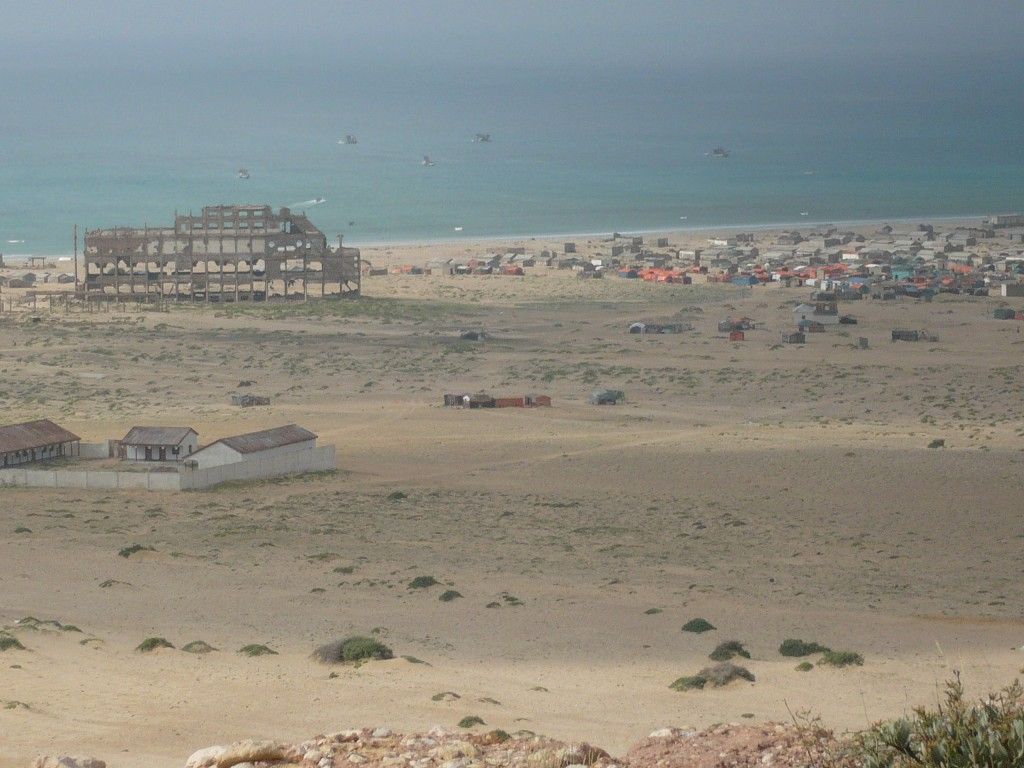
Remains of the Treatment plant (of "Saline Dante") in the outskirts of Hafun

Hafun Salt Factory (called initially Saline Dante in Italian) was the biggest salt factory in the world during the 1930s. It was created in the area of Hafun (then called "Dante") by the Italians in northern Italian Somalia. In 1941, it was destroyed during the British conquest of Italian East Africa, in World War II.

== History ==
In 1930, an Italian firm called "Società Saline e Industrie della Somalia settentrionale Migiurtina" ("Saline Companies and Industries of Northern Somalia Migiurtina") invested huge capital to exploit salt deposits in Dante and Hurdiyo. The Hafun Salt Factory was created and was the main producing facility of sea salt in the world in the 1930s. By 1933 or 1934, the Dante salt works were producing more than 200,000 metric tons of salt, most of which was exported to India and the Far East.

The industrial facility of "Saline Dante" gave work to 600 Italians and 2,000 natives (nearly all the native males in Hafun), giving a huge boost to the local Somali economy: Dante city (now called Hafun) grew to more than 5,000 inhabitants in 1939. Electrical plants were built in the Dante area for the facility, together with an aqueduct, solving the semi-desert area problems for the first time in its history. The production reached nearly half a million tons per year in the late 1930s and was supposed to increase in the 1940s, but World War II stopped it.

Soon after the First World War, the Italians realized that the shallow bay of Hafun, which had a long, low beach along the mainland side, was a perfect place for a large salt works. The "Società Saline e Industrie della Somalia Settentrionale" built on both sides of the peninsula of Ras Hafun (Hafun and Hurdiyo) what would be the largest salt-works in the world. The firm, constituted in Milan in 1922, rebuilt a town for 5,000 inhabitants in what was ancient Hafun and called it with the name "Dante". Construction began in 1922 and was completed by 1929. In 1931, production began at the salt factory and soon the enterprise at Ras Hafun was exporting by sea over three hundred thousand tons of salt a year for industrial use. In 1941, during World War II, the British, who had lost British Somaliland to an Italian attack, sent north into Somalia from Kenya an expeditionary force that captured all of Italian East Africa and in the process destroyed the salt works.

The salt was treated with a total of 27.0 km (16.8 miles) long Ropeway conveyor of the salt pans: about 14.0 km (8.7 miles) were across the lagoon to a station on the opposite bank, and then another 16.0 km (9.9 miles) were to the Treatment plant at Dante.

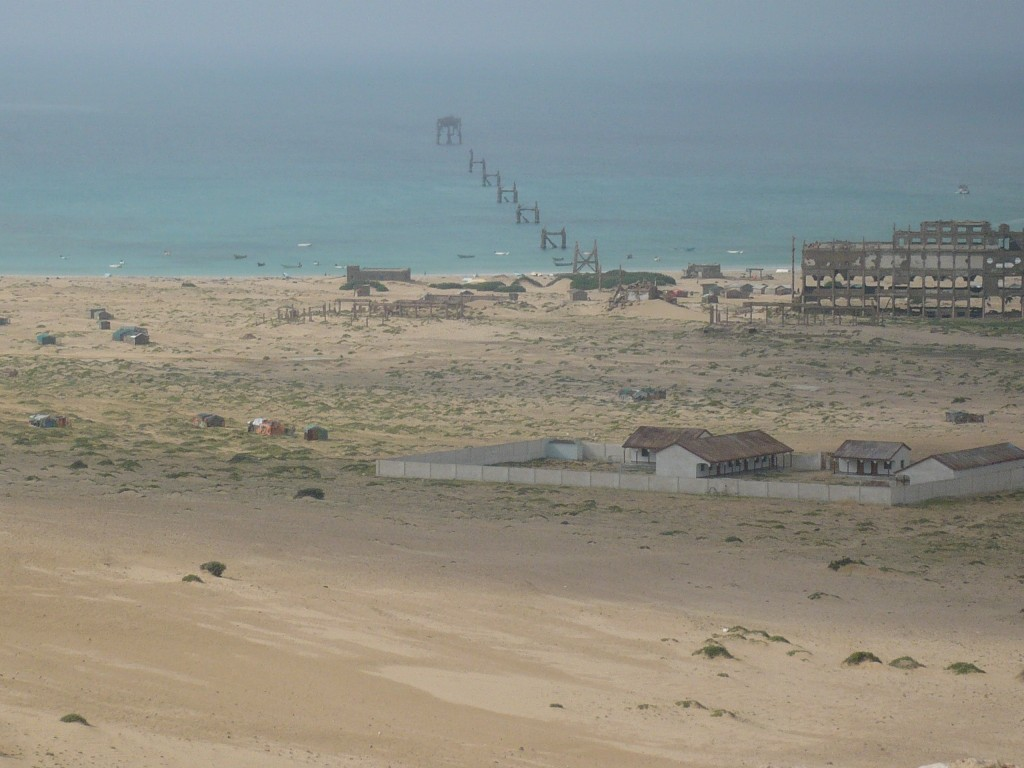
Remaining transport-towers & buildings of the Hafun Salt Factory, built in the 1930s by the Italians, in what is now the area of Hafun in Hafun District, Somalia, 2007.

From there, the cable car went to be up to 1.5 km (0.93 miles) into the sea extending loading facilities. The cable car and the rope way was built around 1925, by the German company "Ernst Heckel". The British destroyed the salt factory in 1941 during their conquest of Italian Somalia and since then the productivity has been reduced to a minimal activity until the 1950s, when was totally abandoned. The result was that Hafun in the 1970s was reduced to a small village of nearly 500 native inhabitants surviving mainly on fishing.

However, in late 2014, Udug Limited, in conjunction with the United States–based REDD Engineering & Construction Inc., began conducting feasibility studies for the renovation of the salt production plants in Hafun and Hurdiyo. The first phase of the initiative was completed in March 2015, and saw the historic salt works in both towns refurbished following community-wide consultations. REDD Engineering official Lowry Redd indicated that the initiative aims to make the plant in the area of Hafun one of the main global suppliers of salt.

== See also ==
- Italian Somaliland
- Italian Somalis
- Ras Hafun
- Somalia
