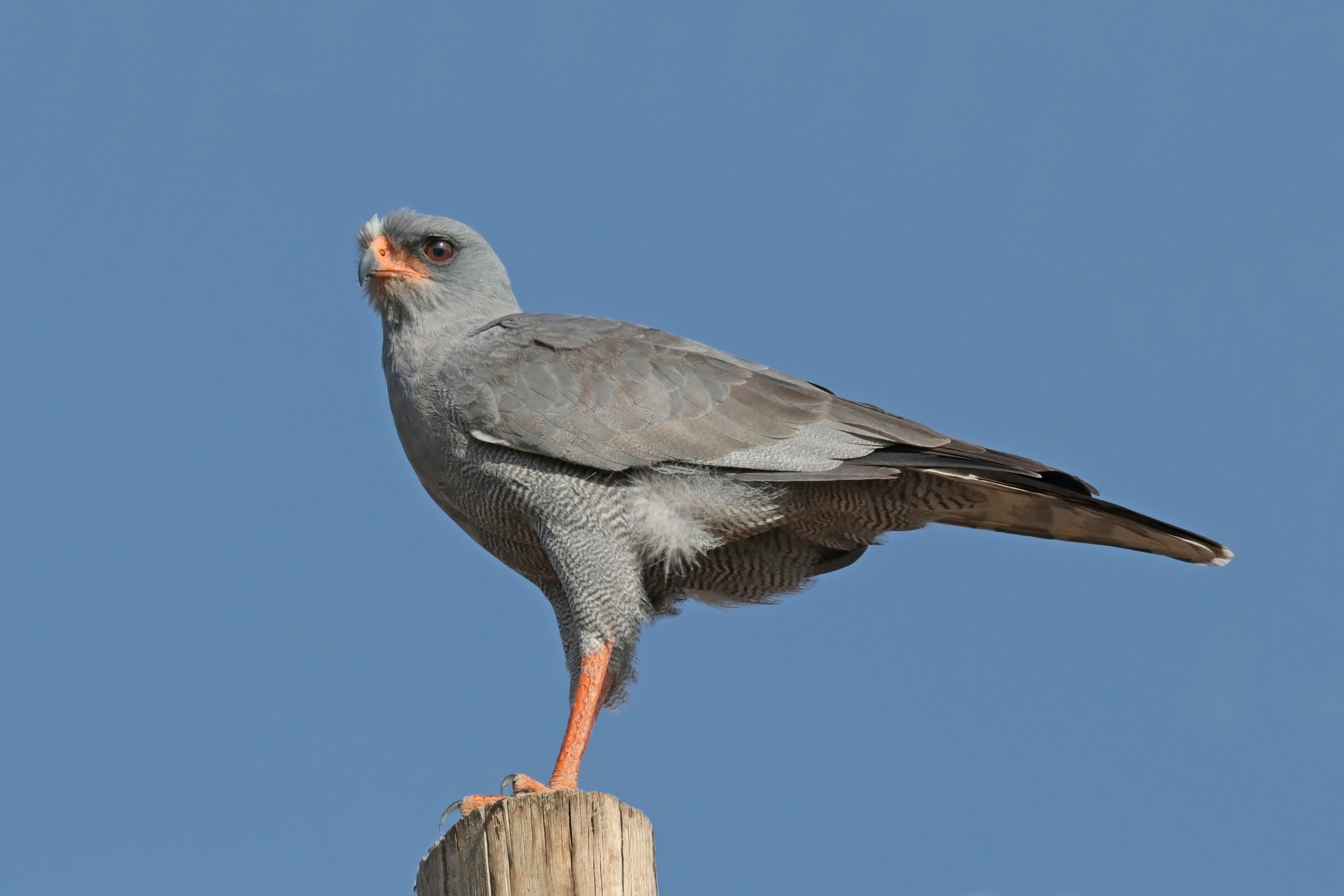
- Awash National Park, Ethiopia

Conservation status
- Least Concern (IUCN 3.1)

Scientific classification
- Kingdom: Animalia
- Phylum: Chordata
- Class: Aves
- Order: Accipitriformes
- Family: Accipitridae
- Genus: Melierax
- Species: M. poliopterus

Binomial name
- Melierax poliopterus Cabanis, 1868

= Eastern chanting goshawk =

Species of bird

The eastern (pale) chanting goshawk (Melierax poliopterus), or Somali chanting goshawk, is a bird of prey of East Africa.

== Taxonomy ==
This species is intermediate between the smaller dark chanting goshawk (widespread to the west and south) and the pale chanting goshawk (southern Africa) in colour, size, and leg length, but not in range. It has often been considered a subspecies of the latter, but because of this disparity between geography and characters, it is now considered a separate species, as agreed by many authorities.

== Description ==
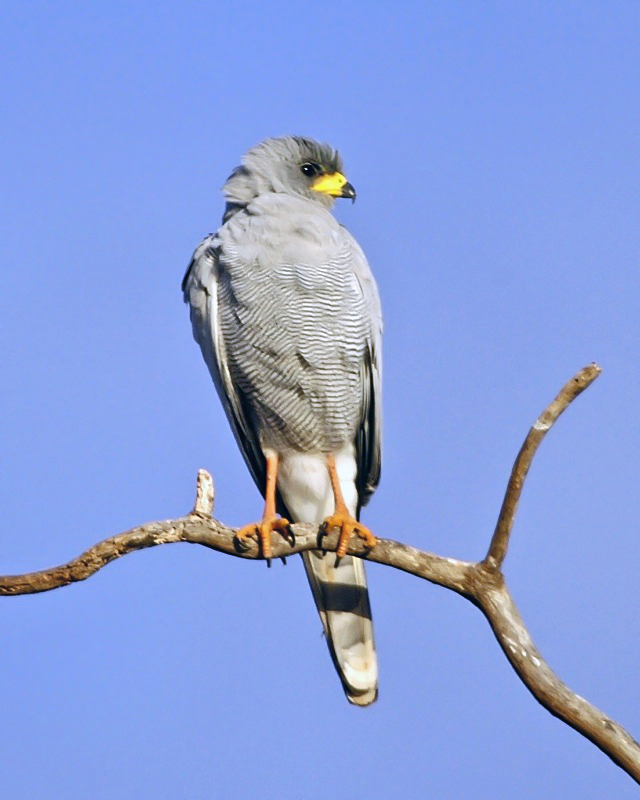
In Tsavo East National Park, Kenya

This species averages 49 to 55 cm (19 to 22 in) long, with a wingspan of 96 to 110 cm (38 to 43 in) and a tail length of 20 to 25 cm (7.9 to 9.8 in). Males average 85 percent the size of females. Like the other chanting goshawks, it resembles an accipiter but the tail is shorter and graduated (the feathers increase in length from the edges to the center), and the wings are broader.

Adults have grey head, neck, breast, and upperparts, except for the white or lightly barred uppertail coverts. The belly has narrow grey and white bars and the undertail coverts are white. The belly and wing linings are white, the secondaries are light grey, and the primaries are dark, giving an impression from below of a white bird with grey head and dark wingtips. The tail is blackish above and white below with grey bars. The cere is yellow, and the legs are orange-red. Juveniles are dull brown above with a pale stripe over the eye. They have white underparts with brown streaks on the throat and breast, brown bars on the belly coverts, and faint or no barring on the undertail coverts. The tail is brown with widely spaced darker brown bars. The rump is white, partially barred or unmarked. They are indistinguishable from some juvenile dark chanting goshawks except for the less barred undertail coverts and rump. Also, the legs are slightly longer at all ages than the dark chanting goshawk's.

== Distribution and habitat ==
It is often found in semidesert, dry bush, and wooded grassland up to 2000 m in southern Ethiopia, Djibouti, western Somalia, eastern Kenya, northeastern Tanzania, and adjacent Uganda.

== Behaviour ==
The eastern chanting goshawk is usually seen in large groups of up to 16, they will always hunt in a pack and ration their finds amongst each other. It often perches on the tops of mountains and other rocky environments. Its wingbeats are shallow and "straight-arm". It holds its wings flat, or sometimes in a C, when it glides.

Its calls are "a melodious piping rhee-opee-opee-opee, and a short low-pitched kleee-yeu", slightly higher-pitched than those of the dark chanting goshawk, or "pereu-pereu-pereu-repee-repee-repee-repee..." in the nesting season, the source of its name.

It will hunt large insects, such as beetles (including dung beetles), snakes, small to medium-sized birds (such as doves, gamebirds, and passerines), and rodents. However, its favorite prey seems to be lizards which it will often snatch up off the ground after swooping down upon them from an exposed perch. Though not common, this species will also feed on carrion from time to time.
