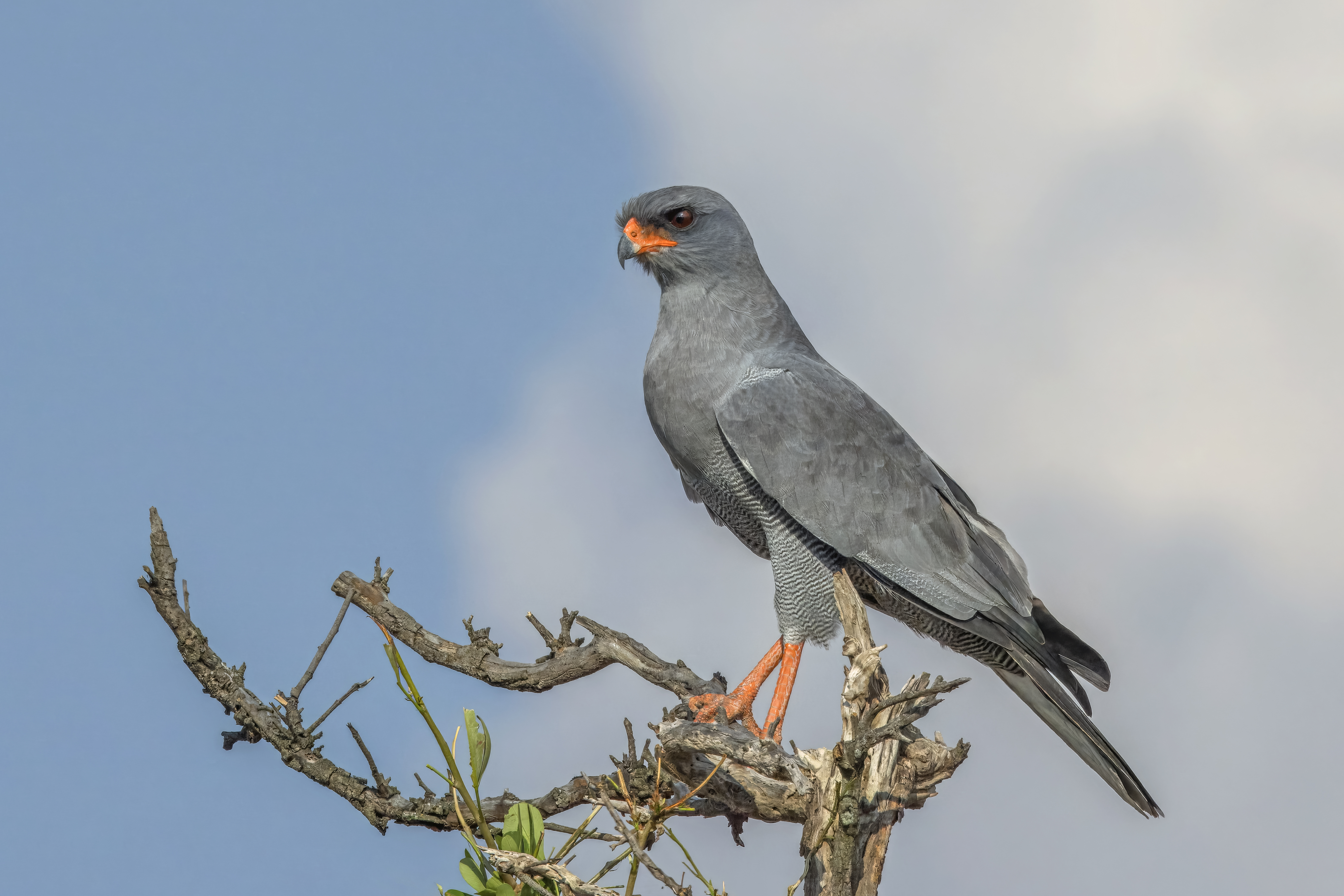
- M. m. matabates Serengeti National Park, Tanzania

Conservation status
- Least Concern (IUCN 3.1)

Scientific classification
- Kingdom: Animalia
- Phylum: Chordata
- Class: Aves
- Order: Accipitriformes
- Family: Accipitridae
- Genus: Melierax
- Species: M. metabates

Binomial name
- Melierax metabates Heuglin, 1861

Subspecies
- M. m. theresae - Meinertzhagen, R, 1939; M. m. ignoscens - Friedmann, 1928; M. m. metabates - Heuglin, 1861; M. m. mechowi - Cabanis, 1882

= Dark chanting goshawk =

Species of bird

The dark chanting goshawk (Melierax metabates) is a bird of prey in the family Accipitridae which is found across much of sub-Saharan Africa and southern Arabia, with an isolated and declining population in southern Morocco.

== Description ==
The dark chanting goshawk is a medium-sized, bulky hawk with an upright stance. The head, breast and upperparts are essentially dark grey, while the underparts, other than the breast, are white, finely barred with black. The wing primaries are black, and the tail has broad black and white bars. The cere and the long legs are orange-red. The female is, on average, larger than the male, weighing up to 840g to the male's maximum weight of 700g. Juveniles tend to have browner plumage reminiscent in colour and pattern to a buzzard Buteo spp but with the broad winged, long tailed silhouette of an accipiter.

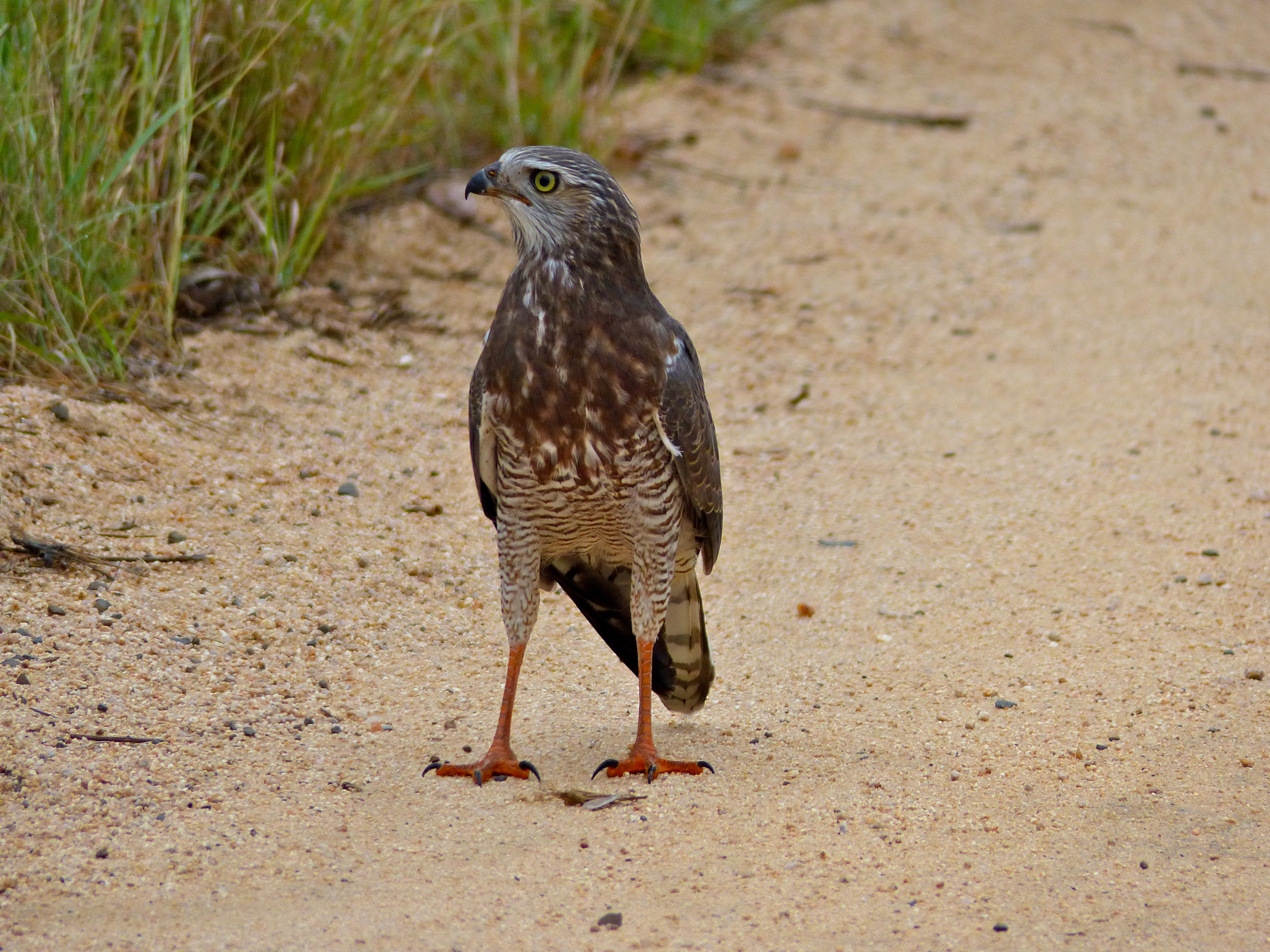
Juvenile

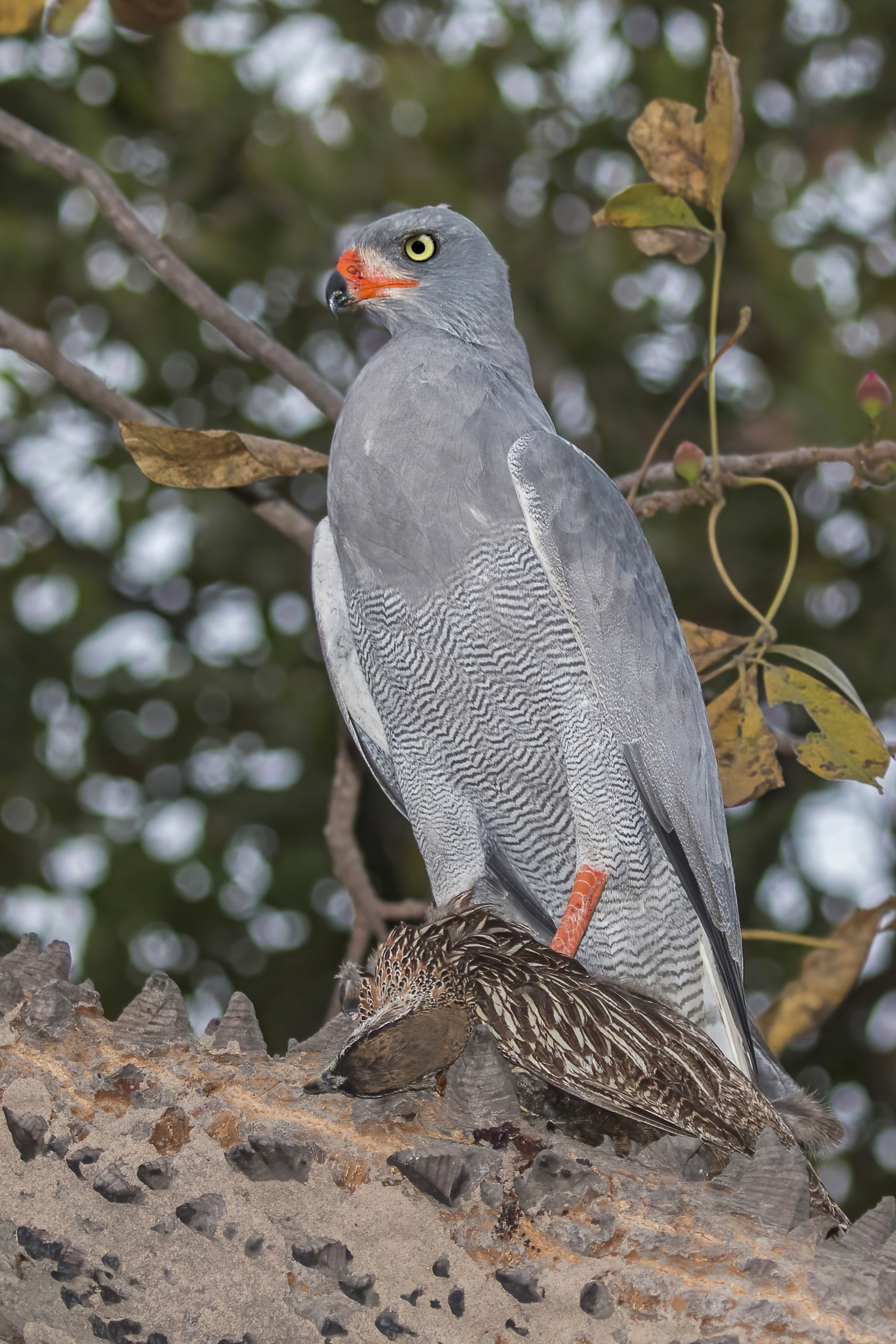
M. m. metabates with prey (a francolin), Senegal

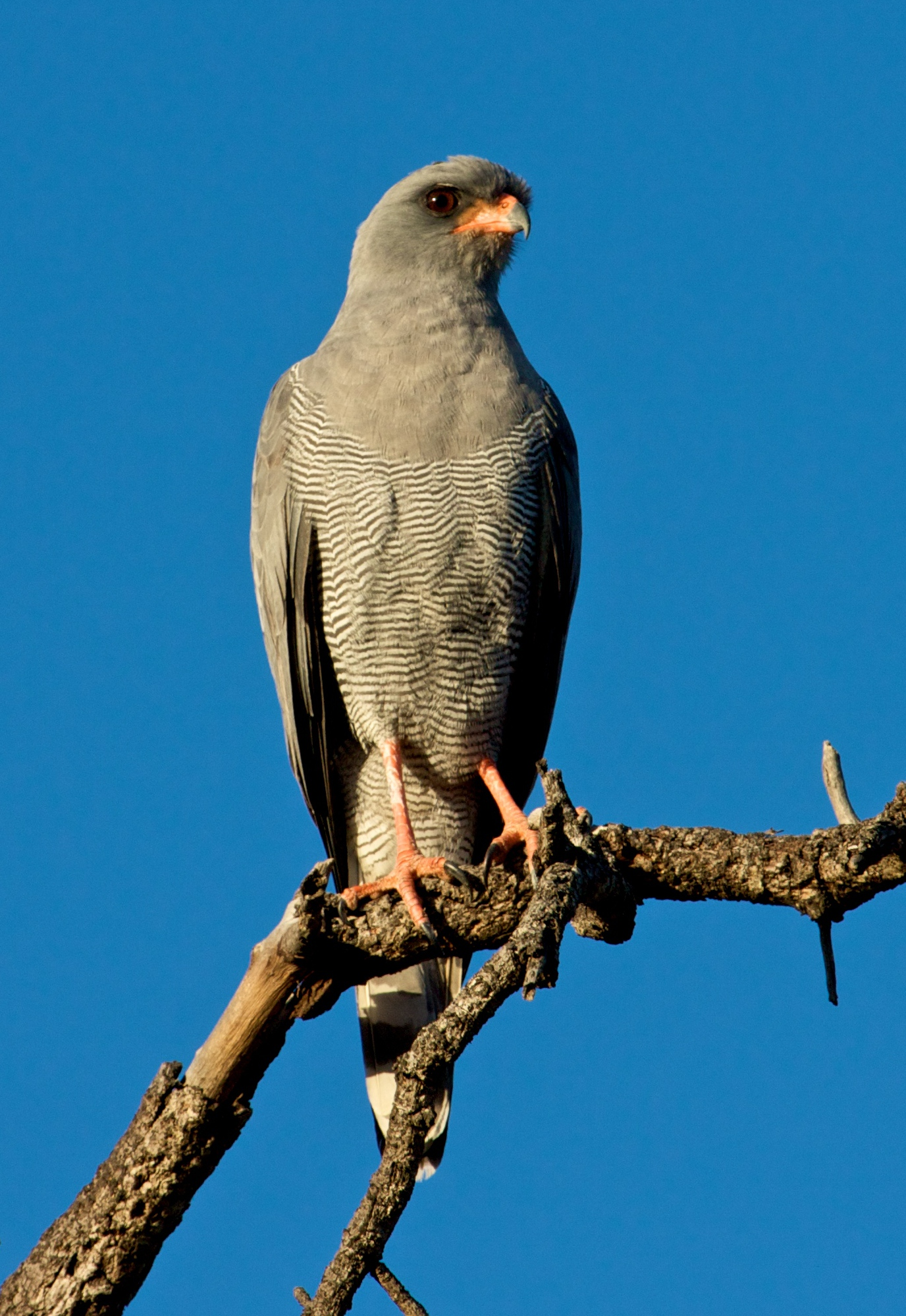
Adult, South Africa

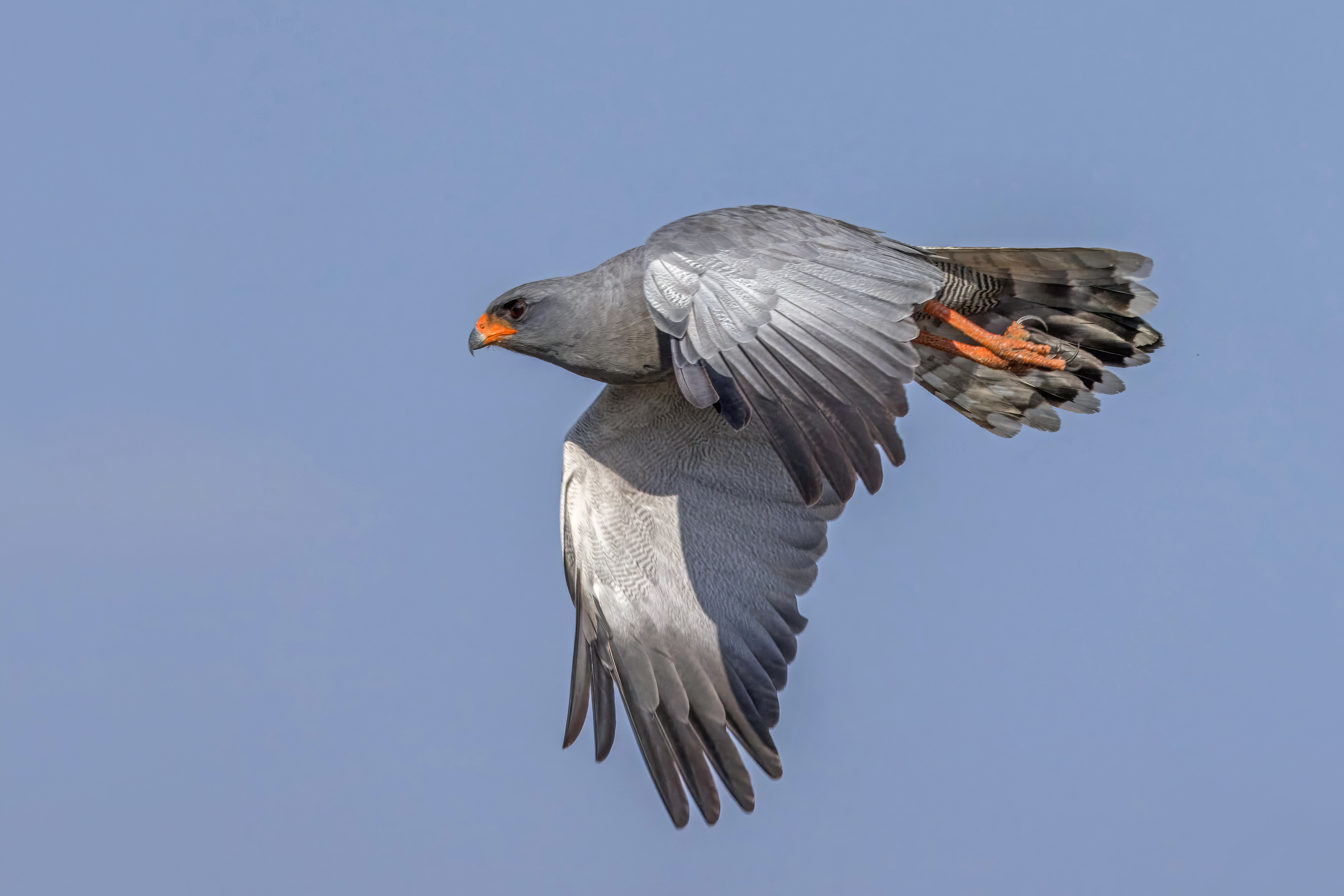
in flight, Tanzania

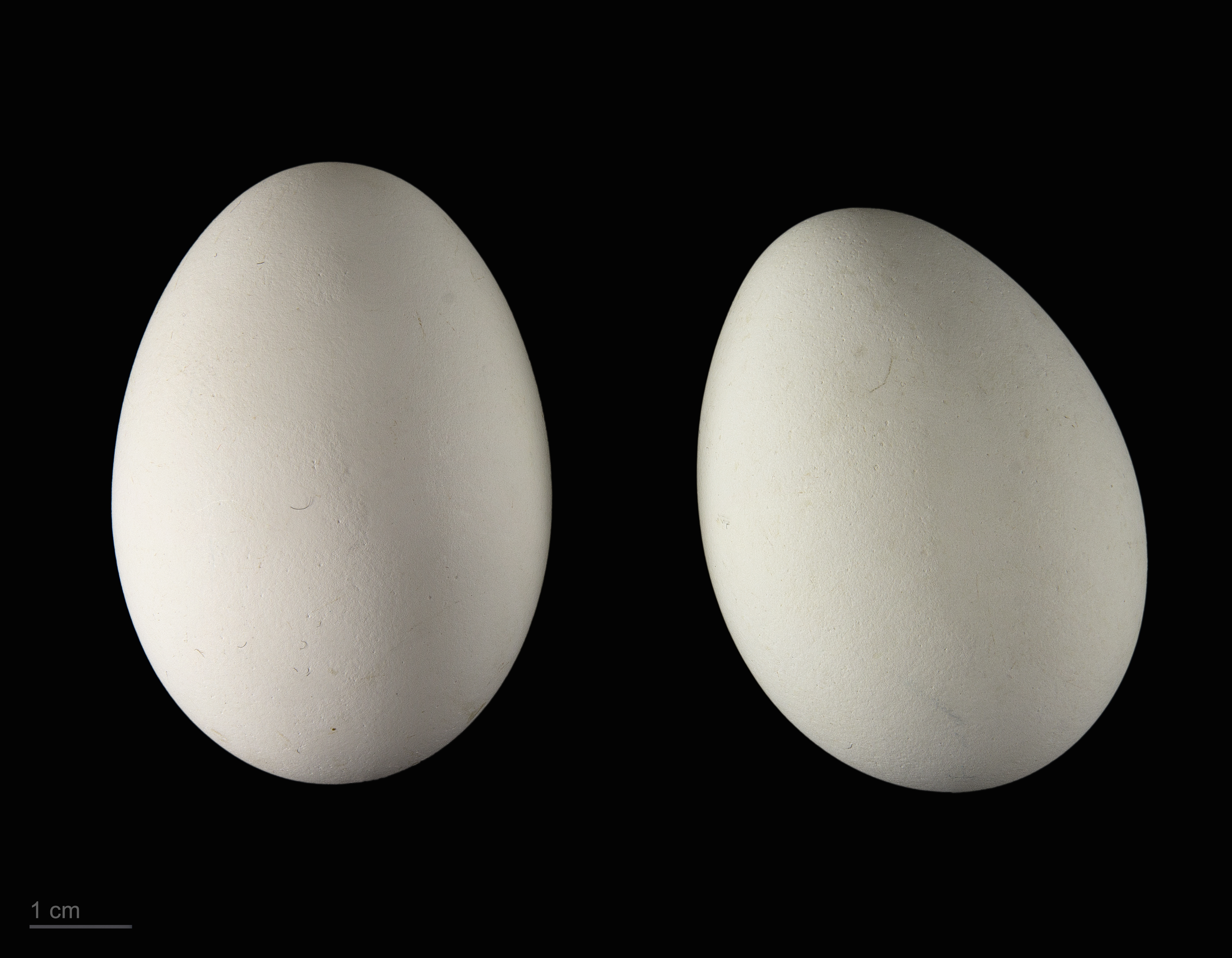
Melierax metabates - MHNT

=== Voice ===
As its common name suggests, the dark chanting goshawk is a vocal bird, although less so than its two congeners. It often calls from a perch or in flight, making an accelerating series of piping notes and fluty whistles, which has been described as a song or chant and there are up to a dozen notes in a series peeu-peeu-pu-pu-pu. It also gives a high-pitched peee-u. During the breeding season it is more vocal than when non breeding.

== Distribution and subspecies ==
The dark chanting goshawk breeds in sub-Saharan Africa, but avoids the rainforests of the Congo Basin and the far south, where it is replaced by the pale chanting goshawk and east Africa where the eastern chanting goshawk seems to replace it.

There are five currently recognised subspecies,

- Melierax metabates metabates: Senegal and the Gambia east to Ethiopia, south to the Democratic Republic of the Congo and northern Tanzania.
- Melierax metabates neumanni: Mali east to northern Sudan.
- Melierax metabates theresae: south west Morocco.
- Melierax metabates ignoscens: South western Arabia, i.e. south western Saudi Arabia and western Yemen.
- Melierax metabates mechowi: south eastern Gabon to Angola, south Tanzania south to northern Namibia and north eastern South Africa.

Although the status of M. neumanni is debatable as it is poorly differentiated.

== Habitat ==
The dark chanting goshawk occurs in savannahs and open woodlands, favouring mixed bushveld and broad-leafed woodlands and avoid dense forest and desert, where it overlaps with other Melierax species the dark chanting goshawk prefers moister richer woodland. In southern Africa it is found in tall, well-developed woodland, especially where miombo (Brachystegia spp), mopane (Colosphermum mopane), Zambezi teak (Baikiaea plurijuga), Knob thorn (Senegalia nigrescens) and Marula (Sclerocarya birrea) are among the canopy.

== Habits ==
The dark chanting goshawk preys on a wide variety of animals, especially mammals, birds and reptiles; these are normally hunted from a perch, from which the bird swoops to capture prey on the ground or in the air. They have been recorded following honey badgers (Mellivora capensis), Southern ground-hornbills, dogs or people, catching the small animals disturbed by their passage. The largest recorded prey items are helmeted guineafowl Numida meleagris and dwarf mongoose.

The dark chanting goshawk is a territorial nester. The courtship display is performed by both sexes during which the male repeatedly dives at the female, who presents her claws to him. The nest is constructed in a tree by both sexes and is a flattish platform of sticks, slightly lower in the centre than at the edges and decorated with spider webs and sometimes cemented with mud. It may be lined with a wide variety of materials, including animal, plant, mineral and man-made objects. The one to two, occasionally three, eggs are laid from July–November, with a peak from August–October, and they are incubated by the female for around 36–38 days, while the male brings food to her at the nest. Initially, the young are brooded and guarded by the female, while the male hunts to provide all the food. The young fledge at about 50 days old, and are fully independent roughly 3–8 months after fledging. They move away from their natal area at the beginning of the following breeding season.

== Taxonomy ==
The chanting goshawks are sometimes considered to be a single species, the chanting goshawk Melierax metabates, or to be this species plus the other two lumped as the pale chanting goshawk Melierax canorus.

== Conservation status ==
The dark-chanting goshawk is widespread and common and therefore not globally threatened. However, the two isolated subspecies occurring in Morocco and the Arabian Peninsula, are highly vulnerable to the clearance of woodland. In particular the subspecies Melierax metabates theresae, is confined to a small area of south western Morocco, where it is thought to be nearly extinct as a result of deforestation and hunting. Otherwise its wide range means that Birdlife International categorise the species as Least Concern.
