= British Institute of Eastern Africa =

British research institute in Kenya

The British Institute in Eastern Africa (BIEA) is headquartered in Nairobi, Kenya, and is dedicated to supporting historical, archaeological, and other social science and humanities research in eastern Africa. The BIEA is sponsored by the British Academy.

The BIEA was founded in 1959 as the British Institute of History and Archaeology in East Africa. Its first director was the archaeologist Neville Chittick. The institute changed its name to the "British Institute in Eastern Africa" in 1970, and the BIEA's current facilities in Kileleshwa, Nairobi, include an extensive research library and office resources for visiting scholars. The BIEA sponsors a Graduate Attachment Scheme, as well as Humanities Research Fellowship program and an Archaeology Research Fellowship program.

Membership to the BIEA is open to all.

== Publications ==
Two academic journals are currently produced by the BIEA, Azania: Archaeological Research in Africa and the Journal of Eastern African Studies.

== Directors ==
Neville Chittick (1961-1983)

John Sutton (1983-1998)

Paul Lane (1998-2006)

Justin Willis (2006-2009)

Ambreena Manji (2010-2014)

Joost Fontein (2014-2018)

Jane Humphris (2018-present), London

Freda Nkirote (2018-present), Nairobi

== Repatriation of human remains from Kilwa ==
The British Institute in Eastern Africa (BIEA) held a collection of human skeletal remains originating from archaeological excavation in the Kilwa District of Tanzania. The remains were collected by archaeologist Neville Chittick during his work in Tanganyika in the late 1950s and were transferred to Kenya after he became the Institute's first director in 1961. The remains were stored at the Institute's facilities in Nairobi for several decades.

In 2016, the Institute facilitated the return of a small number of human remains and cultural materials from Kilwa to the National Museum of Tanzania. A further repatriation initiative developed in August 2022, following a discussion between Kennedy Gitu, then a research fellow associated with the BIEA and Emmanuel Yacobo, director of the National Museum of Tanzania at an archaeological conference in Zanzibar. The two researchers worked to catalogue the materials and initiate the necessary administrative procedures.

In September 2022, the correspondence and a catalogue of the materials were submitted to Tanzania's Ministry of Natural Resources and Tourism to request authorization for their repatriation and in March 2023, the BIEA coordinated the transportation of the remaining Kilwa human remains from Nairobi to Dar es Salaam, where they were transferred to the National Museum of Tanzania.
