= Effect of the 2004 Indian Ocean earthquake on Somalia =

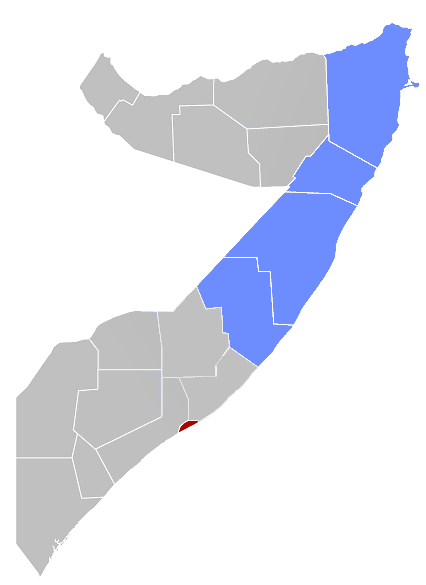
Map of Somalia with the regions primarily affected highlighted in blue. The Hafun is the small peninsula in the northeast. Banaadir (Mogadishu) is highlighted red for reference.

The effect of the 2004 Indian Ocean earthquake on Somalia was significant. Coastal and rural communities in Somalia, as far as 4,500 km (2,800 mi) from the epicentre of the 2004 Indian Ocean earthquake, were swept away or destroyed by the resulting tsunami on 26 December 2004. As of 5 January 2005, the confirmed death toll stood at 298. According to presidential spokesperson Yusuf Mohamed Ismail of the Transitional Federal Government, more than 50,000 people were also displaced.

== Impact ==
Most of the damage was centered in the coastal parts of the autonomous Puntland state in northeastern Somalia, particularly the area between Hafun in the Bari region and Garacad in Mudug. The narrow and low-lying peninsula of Hafun, 1,150 km (710 mi) northeast of Mogadishu, was especially affected. In Puntland, rising waters destroyed properties in Hafun and Kulub, while parts of the towns and hamlets of Bander Beyla, Eyl, Foar and Bargaal were flooded. Other coastal areas, including Lower Juba, were also somewhat affected. The UN reported that the waves destroyed 1,180 homes, smashed 2,400 boats and rendered freshwater wells and reservoirs unusable. The village of Kulub, near Garacad, was still partially submerged as of 6 January. At Kulub, Hurdiye and other places, teams from the WFP reported that all the boats and other fishing equipment used by the residents to make a livelihood had been lost.

== Aftermath ==
On 30 December, around 12 tons of rice, maize and vegetable oil were delivered to Hafun, four days after the tsunami. Previous attempts to deliver emergency relief failed after trucks were unable to pass tsunami damaged roads near Foar, a village of 1000 people which had been destroyed. The main sand bridge which connects the Hafun peninsula to the mainland was damaged, so the twelve tonnes were then transferred onto two four-wheel drive vehicles that managed the 60 km (37 mi) trip from Foar to Hafun in seven hours. The UN warned that the tsunami had worsened the situation after four years of drought in northern Somalia and that further aid was required. It distributed 200 tonnes of food rations to 12,000 people, but stated that 30,000 was the target. The UN had four teams in the area and on 4 January appealed for US$13,000,000 to assist 54,000 locals affected by the tsunami. As part of the flash inter-agency appeal of US$977,000,000 made by the UN Secretary-General on 6 January, USD10,000,000 was requested for Somalia. In February, the U.S. government made one million dollars available for tsunami relief in the country.
