= Effect of the 2004 Indian Ocean earthquake on Malaysia =

Effects of the 2004 Indian Ocean earthquake and tsunami in Malaysia

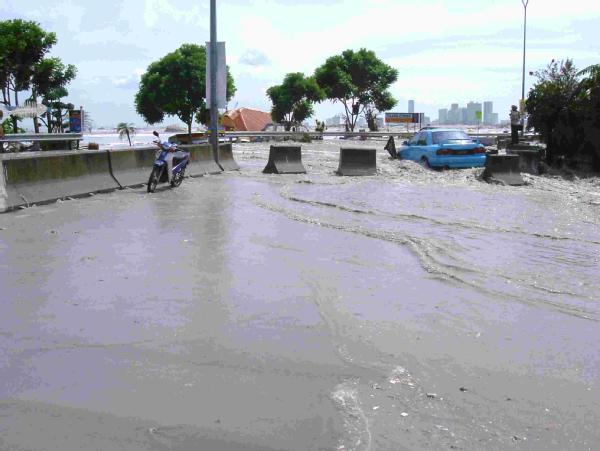
A tsunami wave striking the coastal road at George Town, Penang

The effect of the 2004 Indian Ocean earthquake and tsunami on Malaysia was most severe along the country's northwestern coast, particularly in the states of Penang and Kedah. On 26 December 2004, the tsunami generated by the earthquake off the western coast of northern Sumatra struck coastal communities in Peninsular Malaysia, causing deaths, damaging property and disrupting fishing and other coastal activities. A total of 67 deaths were reported in Malaysia, with Penang accounting for the majority of the fatalities.

Although Malaysia was affected by the disaster, the island of Sumatra lay between the earthquake's epicentre and much of the country's western coastline, influencing the tsunami's impact on the Malaysian mainland. Nevertheless, waves reached several coastal settlements and islands, damaging houses, vehicles, boats and other property. The disaster prompted emergency assistance for affected residents and government measures to support bereaved families, injured people and those who had lost their homes or livelihoods.

== Background ==
The 2004 Indian Ocean earthquake and tsunami occurred on 26 December 2004, when a major undersea earthquake off the western coast of northern Sumatra generated a tsunami that affected countries bordering the Indian Ocean. In Malaysia, the effects were concentrated along the northwestern coast of Peninsular Malaysia and nearby islands, including Penang and Langkawi. The geographical position of Sumatra influenced the waves reaching Malaysia, although coastal communities remained exposed to the tsunami hazard.

== Impact ==
=== Coastal inundation and property damage ===
The areas most severely affected included the northwestern coastal regions and nearby islands, particularly Penang and Langkawi. Reported wave heights near the shore were 2.5–3 m (8.2–9.8 ft) in Langkawi and 2–3 m (6.6–9.8 ft) in Penang. Wave run-up reached 6–8 m (20–26 ft) at one location, while the tsunami inundated some areas up to 3 km (1.9 mi) inland.

In Penang, coastal settlements and recreational areas were affected, including Batu Ferringhi and Balik Pulau. Houses in fishing villages sustained damage, while the waves carried mud and debris onto roads and affected vehicles along Gurney Drive in George Town, Penang. The disaster also struck people visiting public beaches, where families and picnickers were exposed to the incoming waves.

In Kedah, the tsunami affected coastal communities in Kuala Muda District, including 13 villages. Coastal areas in Langkawi, including Kuala Triang, were also affected. Fishing communities suffered damage to boats and other property, disrupting activities that depended on access to the sea.

In Langkawi, approximately one-quarter of the holiday vessels anchored at Rebak and Telaga harbours were reported to have been damaged. The impact on boats and coastal property demonstrated the tsunami's consequences for maritime and tourism-related activities in addition to its effects on residential communities.

The tsunami also caused individual family tragedies. At Pasir Panjang beach, five of the seven children of Zulkifli Mohamad Noor were killed when the waves struck.

=== Other reported effects ===
Sinkholes were reported in Kampar and Ipoh during the three days following the earthquake. Investigations determined that these incidents were not related to the earthquake.

== Aftermath ==
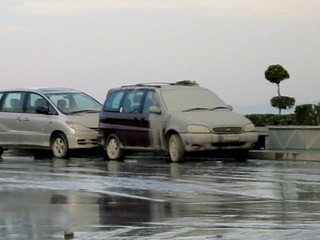
Cars covered in mud following the tsunami along Gurney Drive, George Town, Penang

=== Government response and assistance ===
The then-Prime Minister, Abdullah Ahmad Badawi, cut short his holiday in Spain and returned to Malaysia following a diplomatic visit to India. In response to the disaster, he instructed the government to cancel New Year celebrations and urged public and private organisations to hold prayers and remembrance services for the victims.

The government also announced financial assistance for victims and affected communities. The measures included payments of MYR 1,000 (approximately US$260 at the time) to the families of those killed and MYR 200 (approximately US$50) to people injured in the tsunami. Displaced residents were to receive MYR 200 in assistance, while households were eligible for MYR 2,000 for damaged houses or MYR 5,000 for houses that had been destroyed. Fishermen whose boats were lost were to receive MYR 1,000 for smaller boats and MYR 3,000 for larger boats.

The government also postponed the deportation of undocumented immigrants and extended an amnesty that allowed them to leave the country by 31 January 2005, rather than the original deadline of 31 December 2004.

=== Death toll ===
The reported death toll in Malaysia was 67. Of these, 52 deaths occurred in Penang, 12 in Kedah, two in Perak and one in Selangor.

In Penang, many of those killed were picnickers and children who had been playing on public beaches when the tsunami struck. Accounts of the disaster have also documented the experiences of survivors and the lasting effects of the tragedy on affected families.
