= Aromata =

Ancient proto-Somali trading port

- Aromatum, Aromaton, Aromatica
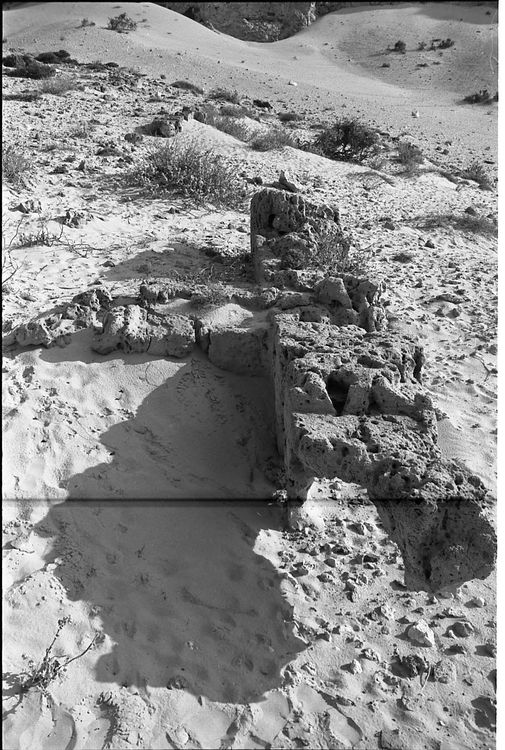
- Ruins of the ancient city of Aromata at Damo excavated by Neville Chittick in 1975-1976.

- Location within Somalia
- 11.8348028°N 51.2368143°E
- Type: Port and emporium
- Location: Cape Guardafui, Damo, Puntland
- Region: Barbaria, Far Side ports ( according to Periplus)
- Part of: ancient Somali city state

Site notes
- Excavation dates: 1975
- Archaeologists: Neville Chittick
- Condition: Ruins

Aromata (Note: Aromatum or Ἀρώματον (Arṓmaton); also referred to as Aromatica.) (Ancient Greek: Ἀρώματα, lit. “spices, aromatics”), also known as the Spice Port or the Market and Cape of Spices, was an ancient seaport and emporium in northeastern Somalia during Classical Antiquity and Late Antiquity. Situated near present-day Cape Guardafui, itself known as the “Promontory/Cape of Spices” (Aromaton akron, Αρώματον ἄκρον). it occupied the eastern extremity of the northern Somali coast. Aromata was renown in the ancient world for its role in the incense and spice trade, serving as a major commercial centre for the production and export of resin, fragrant gums, herbs, and various varieties of cinnamon, from which its toponym derived.

The port is chiefly known through the Periplus of the Erythraean Sea, as well as Geography by Claudius Ptolemy and Ethnica by Stephanus of Byzantium, where it is recorded. Aromata is identified with the site of Damo, where British archaeologist Neville Chittick discovered Roman pottery and the ruins of the old settlement, supporting this identification. Previously, G. W. B. Huntingford had instead identified Aromata with Olok (Olog), located 3 kilometres (1.9 mi) to the west.

== History ==
=== Periplus ===
Aromata is first mentioned in the 1st century Periplus of the Erythraean Sea, where it is described as following:

“Beyond this place, the coast trending toward the south, there is the Market and Cape of Spices, an abrupt promontory, at the very end of the Berber coast toward the east. The anchorage is dangerous at times from the ground-swell, because the place is exposed to the north. A sign of an approaching storm which is peculiar to the place is that the deep water becomes more turbid and changes its color. When this happens they all run to a large promontory called Taba ( Tabae or Tabai), which offers safe shelter. There are imported into this market-town the things already mentioned; and there are produced in it cinnamon (and its different varieties: gizir, asypha, arebo, magla, and moto) and frankincense.”

Alternative translation:

“Beyond this, with the coast by now trending to the south, is the Spice Port and a promontory, the last along the coast of the country of the Barbaroi toward the east, a precipitous one. The harbor, an open roadstead, is dangerous at times because the site is exposed to the north. A local indication of a coming storm is when the depths become rather turbid and change color; when this happens, all take refuge at the big promontory, a site that offers shelter, called Tabai. The port of trade (the Spice Port) likewise offers a market for the aforementioned. Its products are cassia, gizeir, asyphe, aroma, magla, moid, and frankincense.”

Additional goods exported from Aromata included myrrh, duaca (a type of cinnamon), copal, macir, mocrotu, fragrant gums, spices, tortoise shell, ivory, and, on rare occasions, slaves. (Note: In §12, the Periplus of the Erythraean Sea states that Aromata exported “the things already mentioned,” referring to goods previously listed for earlier Far Side ports, including Avalites, Malao, Mundus, and Mosyllon.) The author of the Periplus notes that merchants from Ariaca and Barygaza in India brought to the Far Side ports (Mosylon, Aromata and Opone) products from their regions, including wheat, rice, clarified butter, sesame oil, cotton cloth (monache and sagmatogene), girdles, and honey from the reed called sacchari. The Indians made voyages specifically to these ports, while others exchanged their cargoes while sailing along the coast.

=== Ptolemy ===
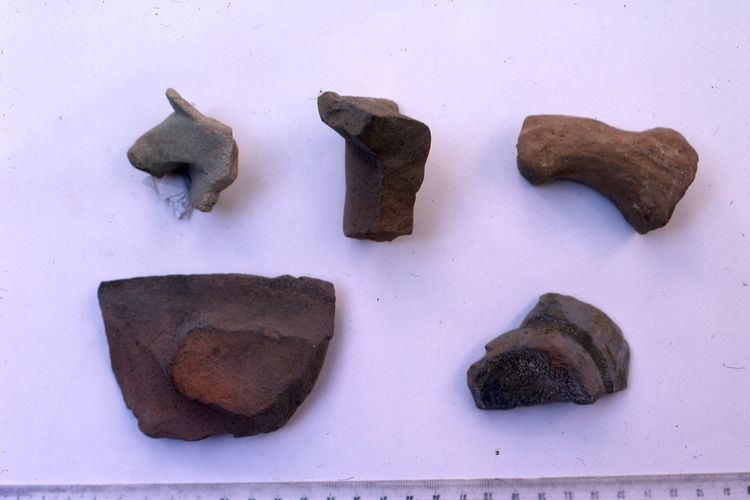
Unglazed pottery sherd excavated at the site of Damo, near Cape Guardafui, northeastern Somalia, by Neville Chittick in 1975.

According to the 2nd-century Geography of Claudius Ptolemy, a merchant called Diogenes, returning from India, was driven south by a north wind as he approached Aromata. He sailed for twenty-five days with Troglodytike on his right before reaching the region of the Nile lakes, slightly south of which lay Rhapta in Azania. A second account, attributed to Marinus of Tyre, describes a merchant named Theophilos who sailed from Rhapta to Aromata in twenty days with a south wind. These accounts indicate that the reported durations reflect the actual time taken on individual voyages, rather than a fixed or average sailing time between Aromata and Rhapta. Ptolemy cites Dioskoros regarding Cape Prason, said to lie many days beyond Rhapta, and records traders’ descriptions of the route from Arabia Felix to Aromata as running southwest rather than due south. On this basis, Aromata is placed by Ptolemy at 83°00′ longitude and 6°00′ latitude, situated on the Gulf of Aden rather than the Indian Ocean.

=== Roman navigation to India ===
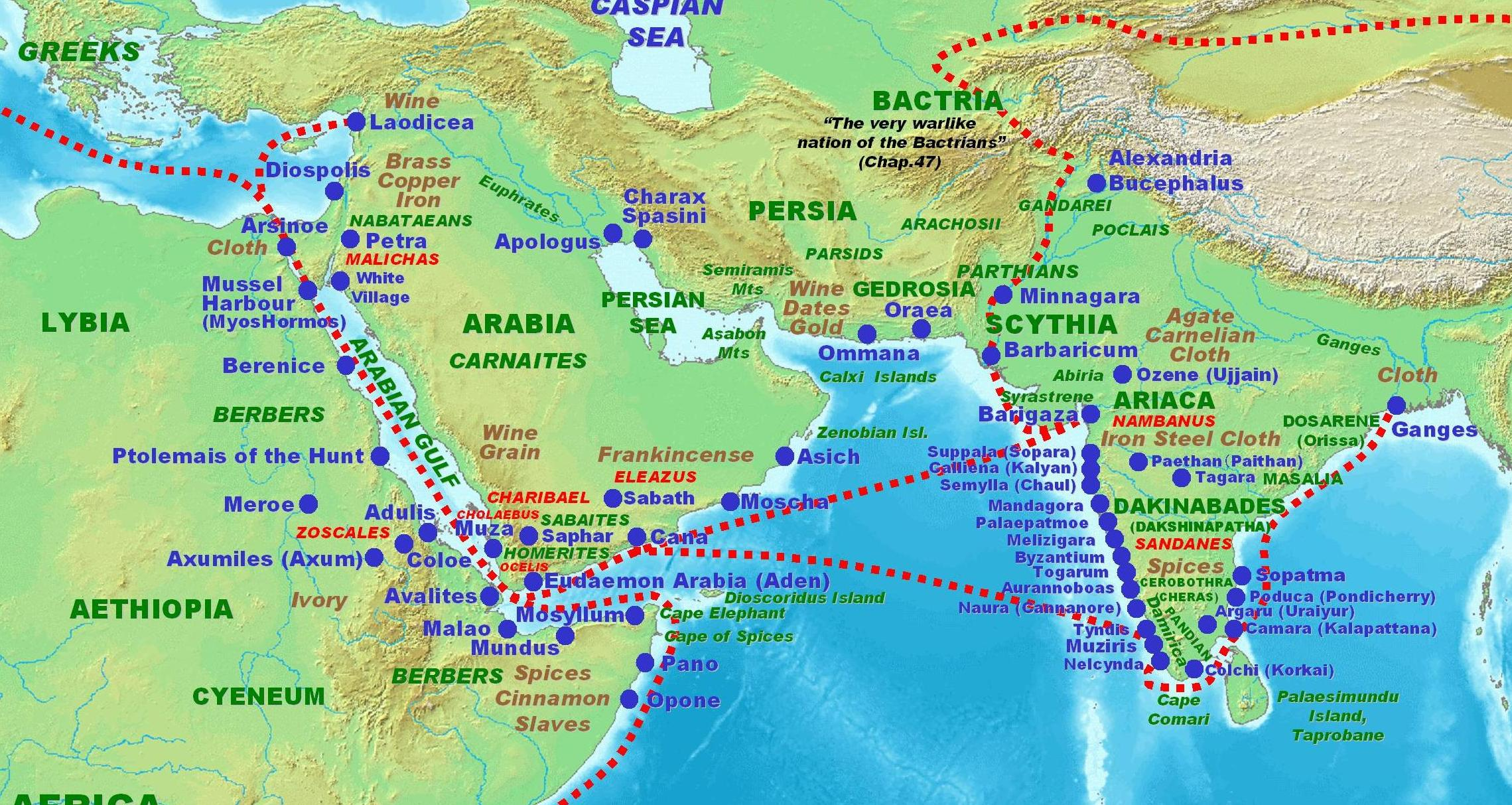
Situated on Cape Guardafui along the Guardafui Channel, Aromata was a well-known harbour and navigational point for sailors travelling toward the Indian subcontinent through the Arabian Sea, hence its appearance in several Greco-Roman geographical works.

Before the adoption of monsoon-based navigation associated with Hippalus, Roman merchants and sailors reached India by following coastal routes, moving gradually from harbour to harbour along the shores of the Arabian Sea. With the recognition that seasonal winds in the Indian Ocean could be used for open-sea sailing, longer and more direct voyages became possible. From ports such as Cana in Arabia Felix and the harbour of the Aromatæ, sailors were then able to cross the ocean more efficiently and reach Limyrike.

=== Late Antiquity ===
Stephanos of Byzantium, in his Ethnica, mentions Aromata, citing Marcian of Heraclea’s Periplus of the Outer Sea as a town of the Ethiopians, whose inhabitants is referred as Aromeus.

== Archaeology and identification ==
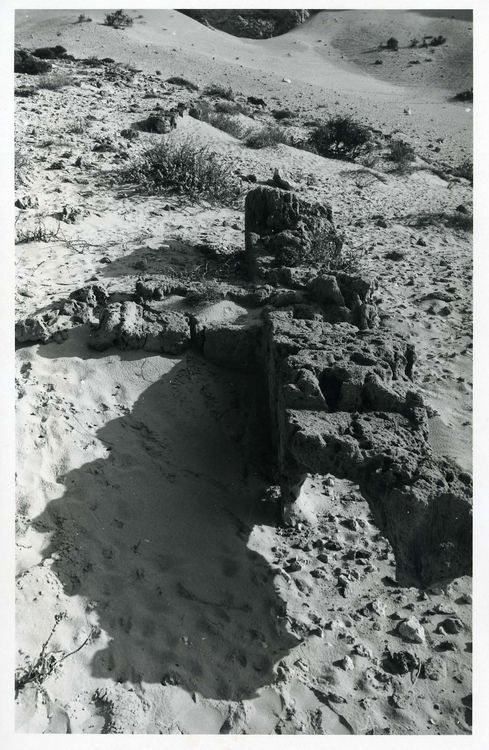
Remains of Aromata ruins at the site of Damo, excavated by Neville Chittick.

Aromata has been identified with the archaeological site of Damo (Daamo), located near Cape Guardafui in northeastern Somalia. During an archaeological survey conducted by Neville Chittick in 1970s, the site revealed rock-cut architectural remains, including wall-like features hewn directly into bedrock, recessed stone settings, an old quarry, and deposits of cut stone blocks. Pottery recovered from the site included unglazed sherds and fragments of handles probably belonging to amphorae, some of which were considered likely to be of Roman origin. On the basis of its location near Cape Guardafui (the promontory widely identified with the Cape of Spices mentioned in the Periplus of the Erythraean Sea) together with the archaeological evidence, Chittick concluded that Damo is the most probable location of ancient Aromata, rejecting earlier identifications with nearby Olog.

== Gallery ==
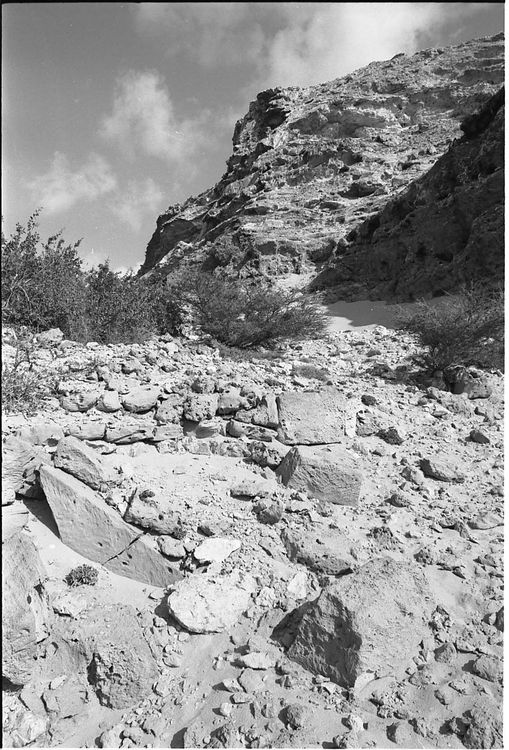
Ruins of Aromata at Damo.

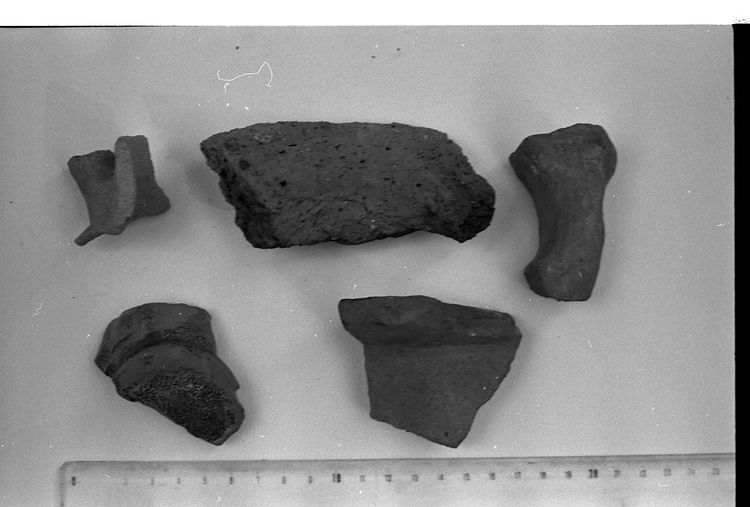
Pottery from Damo.

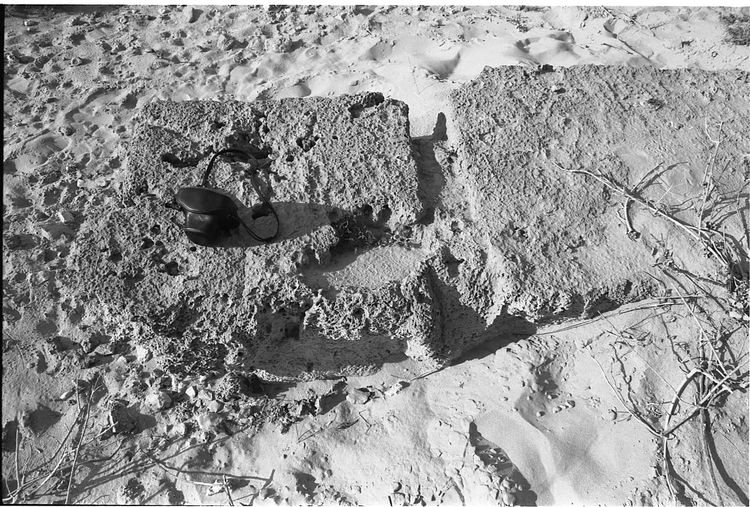
Ruins of a cut-stone block at the archaeological site of Damo in northeastern Somalia.
