= Effect of the 2004 Indian Ocean earthquake on Norway =

The 2004 Indian Ocean earthquake was an undersea megathrust earthquake of moment magnitude 9.2–9.3 that struck the Indian Ocean off the western coast of northern Sumatra, Indonesia on 26 December 2004 at 00:58:53 UTC (07:58:53 local time in Jakarta and Bangkok).

== Norwegian citizens in the affected region ==
- Formally identified dead: 84 (updated 18 May 2005)
- People who were in the affected areas at the time of the disaster: ca. 7,660

=== Problems in reporting ===
The first few days, the Norwegian Foreign office was in charge of collating names and information about people reported missing or with possible whereabouts in the environs of the hit areas. According to their information, 21 Norwegian citizens were confirmed to be killed during the calamity, and about 1,600 were either missing or of unknown whereabouts presumptively in the general South and East Asia regions.

On 30 December the national police took over the lists, which actually had partial information (duplicate or triplicate listings etc.) on more than 8,000 entry lines.

Through the work of the police, those listed as missing were whittled down to below 300. On 3 January the police published a list with names of 279 missing persons, and that there were 16 confirmed deaths instead of the originally reported 21 (no list published). The drop from 21 to 16 was explained by more stringent demands as to legal presumption of death.

It soon transpired that there had been a fair amount of miscommunication, reporting snags and computer errors, even typing errors. Many people who learned that they were on their lists, were able to call in and were removed. By the afternoon of 5 January, the names of missing persons had been lowered to 80. It was furthermore stated that the number of confirmed deaths had, again, been over-reported due to a typing error, dropping the number of confirmed dead from 16 to 12.

Apparently due to the stringency of presumed death declarations, a Norwegian Tamil woman who was killed in the waves in a part of Sri Lanka controlled by the Tamil Tigers, found after one day, identified by local friends and relatives and buried in Sri Lanka on 2 January, remained listed as "missing" on the official list. But on 6 January her name was removed, and the statistics of confirmed dead increased from 12 to 13.

On 18 January the Police published numbers of dead and missing according to an altered system. The number of deceased (eight) included only those whose formal identification had been confirmed by the pertinent civic authorities. The number of missing (then eighty) thus included some people whose bodies had been identified by relatives or friends, but not yet by the authorities.

== History ==
For many years, Thailand has been a popular tourist destination for Norwegians. In recent years, more and more Norwegians had started to celebrate Christmas in the warmth of the south Asian weather, instead of celebrating at home, where the weather can be rough, with temperatures far below zero degrees Celsius as well as snow. In light of these facts, the impact of the catastrophe has a large psychological and personal impact on the small nation.

In Sri Lanka, three Norwegian citizens were reported dead, including one born in the Tamil part of the country and volunteering at an orphanage in her town of birth. The tradition of vacationing there is much more limited than Thailand. The Norwegian Embassy was in a state of emergency following the disaster.

== Impact ==
This disaster exerted significant psychological impact everywhere in the world. Tourism is South-East Asia's biggest export and it was disrupted considerably. However, it is making a comeback with more and more tourists visiting each year.
