= Effect of the 2004 Indian Ocean earthquake on Finland =

The 2004 Indian Ocean earthquake and tsunami, by far the worst disaster in the number of lives lost during peacetime for Finland, killed 179 Finns in Thailand and Sri Lanka, and caused widespread public debate and investigations into the actions of Finnish officials who were claimed to have failed to help their citizens in the affected areas.

== Overview ==
The undersea megathrust earthquake was 9.2+ on the moment magnitude scale and struck the Indian Ocean off the western coast of northern Sumatra, Indonesia. It occurred on 26 December 2004 at 00:58:50 UTC (07:58:50 local time in Jakarta and Bangkok).

== Finnish citizens in the affected regions ==
There were approximately 2300 Finnish citizens on package tours in Thailand, and 600 in Sri Lanka, at the time of the earthquake. The number of independent travellers has not been confirmed. By 31 May 2005, a total number of 179 Finns have been proclaimed dead as caused by the tsunami; as of October 2006, one adult and three children were still officially missing in the affected areas. One person went missing in Sri Lanka and 178 in Thailand. Eight Finnish casualties had resided in Phuket island, and 170 in Khao Lak beach, which was the area in Thailand hardest hit by the catastrophe. 106 Finns went missing from the hotel Blue Village Pakarang in Khao Lak.

Among the dead were a Finnish executive at Pfizer, Harriet Eckstein, and a popular rock and jazz musician, Aki Sirkesalo. Among those who escaped was the future President of Finland, Sauli Niinistö, who saved himself from the tsunami wave by climbing onto a lamppost with his son in Khao Lak.

== Finnish government officials' actions ==
The Finnish government officials were heavily criticised for their slow response to help those citizens affected by the events. There were a high number of travellers in the affected areas in need of information on lost relatives, help to find travel documents to get back home, and generally in need to get evacuated in an organised manner. In Finland, thousands of relatives needed information regarding family members that may have been in the area. The Ministry of Foreign Affairs received the most criticism, mostly by not providing enough emergency telephone services during Boxing Day and the days following.

One of the reasons for the government's slow response, as has been claimed, was the general lack of information about the situation, and the lack of readiness to organise evacuation efforts in politically stable foreign locations. In Sweden, the country in Europe with the highest number of casualties as a result of the tsunami, widespread criticism towards the government led to the resignations of top politicians, but these consequences didn't occur in Finland.

== Diver instructors in rescue efforts ==
In response for the need to coordinate rescue and evacuation efforts for Finnish people in Thailand, a group of Finnish scuba divers started collecting namelists of the ones missing and the ones in safe locations, and sending them as text messages to the homeland to be published in lists in the Sukellus.fi website. This operation was led by entrepreneurs Janne Miikkulainen and Jani Mäkinen from Raya Divers, a scuba diving firm based in Phuket, and by internet entrepreneur Alex Nieminen and journalist Petri Ahoniemi in Helsinki. Miikkulainen, Mäkinen and a crew of tourist agents also circulated hospitals and evacuation centers around Khao Lak and Phuket in order to find Finnish people and give them information about the situation.

Janne Miikkulainen was awarded a Cross of Merit of the Order of the Lion of Finland for his work during and after the catastrophe. The others hosting the Sukellus.fi-website received a State information award.
