= Effect of the 2004 Indian Ocean earthquake on Myanmar =

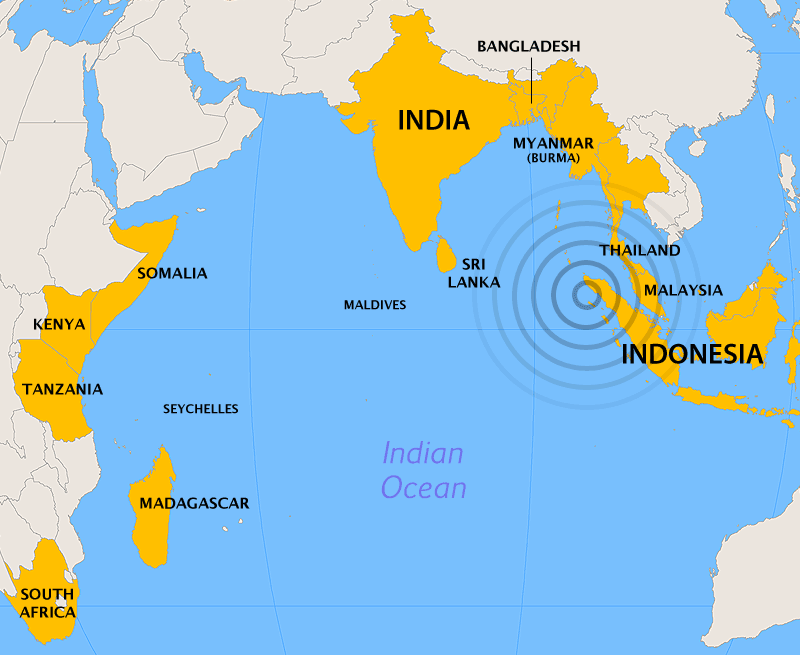
Effect of the 2004 Indian Ocean earthquake on Myanmar

Official reports from the government of Myanmar (Burma) cite a death toll of 90 due to the tsunami caused by the 2004 Indian Ocean earthquake on 26 December 2004. However, some estimates put the toll at between 400 and 600. 30,000 citizens of Burma were estimated to be in need of shelter, food and water, and 788 buildings were reported damaged and destroyed.

An NGO estimated that 2,500 citizens of Burma based in Phang Nga Province, Thailand during the event may have been killed, and that 7,000 Burmese were still unaccounted for. Many of these missing were, however, not presumed to be dead. Many refugees fled to Thailand's interior after the destruction, or were deported or chased back into the hills that divide the countries by Thai authorities.

Although loss of life and property in Burma was suspected to be higher than official reports suggest, loss of life was not as high as in neighbouring Thailand due to various factors, most significantly the numerous islands off the coast of Burma which served to dissipate the force of the tsunami, a rocky shoreline, and the position of the coastline. Also contributing is the fact that it is less developed than neighboring Thailand; international disapproval of the Burmese military regime has prevented the country from building a successful tourism industry.

A Yangon-based representative from the United Nations stated, "Conjecture fuelled by the experiences in neighbouring countries created a major and dangerous disconnect with reality". This assessment was also corroborated by satellite photographs according to Colin Powell, United States Secretary of State.

Burma does not allow journalists into the country and maintained a strong hold on information disseminated in its state-run newspapers - some of which did not acknowledge the tsunami had hit. Burma had refused foreign aid, insisting it was capable to cope by itself. This policy has created a difficult environment to gauge the lives affected by the tsunami.
