= Hafun =

Hafun Xaafuun حافون Οπώνη
- Town
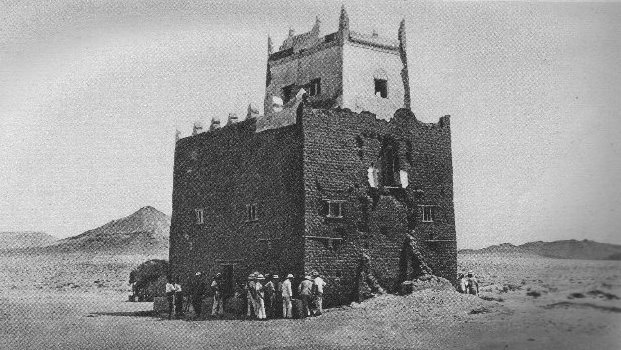
- One of the forts of the Majeerteen Sultanate in Hafun (early 1900s).

- Location in Somalia.
- Coordinates: 10°25′00″N 51°16′00″E
- Country: Somalia
- Regional State: Puntland
- Region: Bari
- District: Hafun
- Established: 1st millennium BC–500 AD

Population (2000 HH)
  - Total: 13,200
- Time zone: UTC+3 (EAT)

Hafun (Somali: Xaafuun; Arabic: حافون; Ancient Greek: Οπώνη, romanized: Opṓnē, Italian: Dante) is a town in the northeastern Bari province of Somalia. Situated in Ras Hafun on the coast of the Guardafui Channel, it is the centre of the Hafun District, and the easternmost town in continental Africa (this means that it sees the first sunrise on the African continent). It is an ancient town previously known as Opone.

== History ==
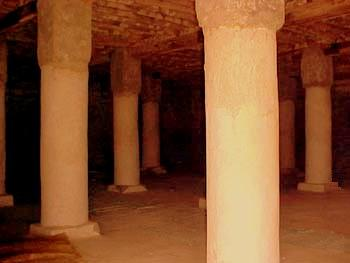
17th century masjid in Hafun.

Hafun has been identified as the ancient trading port of Opone, an ancient proto-Somali city which was described in the 1st century CE Greek travelogue the Periplus of the Erythraean Sea. Pottery found by an expedition led by Neville Chittick, in Oponean tombs at Damo, date back to the Mycenaean kingdom of Greece that flourished during the 16th century BC. Opone was primarily known for its trade with the Ancient Egyptians, Romans, Greeks, Persians, and the states of ancient India. Through archaeological remains, the historic port has been identified with the city of Hafun. It is possible that it corresponds to the Land of Punt as known by the ancient Egyptians during the Old, Middle, and New Kingdom. Merchants from as far afield as Indonesia and Malaysia also passed through the settlement. By 50 CE, the area was well known as a centre for the cinnamon trade, along with the bartering of cloves and other spices, ivory, exotic animal hides, and incense. It also traded in tortoiseshells.

The Majeerteen Sultanate was established possible around 1600s by Somalis from the Majeerteen Darod clan. It reached prominence during the 19th century, under the reign of the resourceful Boqor (King) Osman Mahamuud.

In the mid-17th to early 20th centuries city was among the area ruled by Majeerteen Sultanate Migiurtinia. Later forming a part of Italian Somaliland. Hafun was most strategic place of the Majeerteen Sultanate.The historical city of Hafun likewise had a number of castles and forts in various areas within its realm, including a fortress at Ras Hafun.

== History and trade ==
Pottery found in Oponean tombs date back to the Mycenaean Kingdom of Greece that flourished between the 16th and 11th century BC. Its major periods of activity were during the 1st century BC and the 3rd to the 5th centuries AD. Opone was mentioned by an anonymous Greek merchant in the 1st century AD Periplus of the Erythraean Sea. The town is featured in the ancient document's thirteenth entry, which in part states:

And then, after sailing four hundred stadia along a promontory, toward which place the current also draws you, there is another market-town called Opone, into which the same things are imported as those already mentioned, and in it, the greatest quantity of cinnamon is produced, (the arebo and moto), and a great quantity of tortoiseshell, better than that found elsewhere.

Opone served as a port of call for merchants from Phoenicia, Egypt, Greece, Persia, Yemen, Nabataea, Azania, the Roman Empire and elsewhere, as it sat at a strategic location along the coastal route from the Mokhan trading center of Azania to the Red Sea. Merchants from as far afield as Indonesia and Malaysia passed through the city, exchanging spices, silks, and other goods, before departing south for Azania or north to Yemen or Egypt on the trade routes that spanned the length of the Indian Ocean's rim. As early as 50 AD, it was well known as a center for the cinnamon trade, along with the barter of cloves and other spices, ivory, exotic animal skins and incense.

During the early modern period, Hafun was part of the Majeerteen Sultanate's realm.

In 1930, an Italian firm invested capital to exploit salt deposits in Hafun and Hurdiyo. The Italians renamed the city Dante and created the biggest salt production plant in the world. By 1933 or 1934, the Hafun salt works were producing more than 200,000 tonnes of salt, most of which was exported to the Far East.

Following independence in 1960, the town was made the official centre of Hafun District.

== Archaeological remains ==
Ancient Egyptian, Roman and Persian Gulf pottery has been recovered from the site by an archaeological team from the University of Michigan. In the 1970s, Neville Chittick, a British archaeologist, initiated the British-Somali expedition where he and his Somali colleagues encountered remains of ancient drystone walls, houses with courtyards, and the location of the old harbour.

== Demographics ==
As of 2000, Hafun had a population of around 13,200 inhabitants, mainly dominated by Majeerteen.

== Education ==
According to the Puntland Ministry of Education, there are eight primary schools in Hafun District. Among these are Hurdiya, Laamiye, Gardush, and Xandha.

== Economy ==
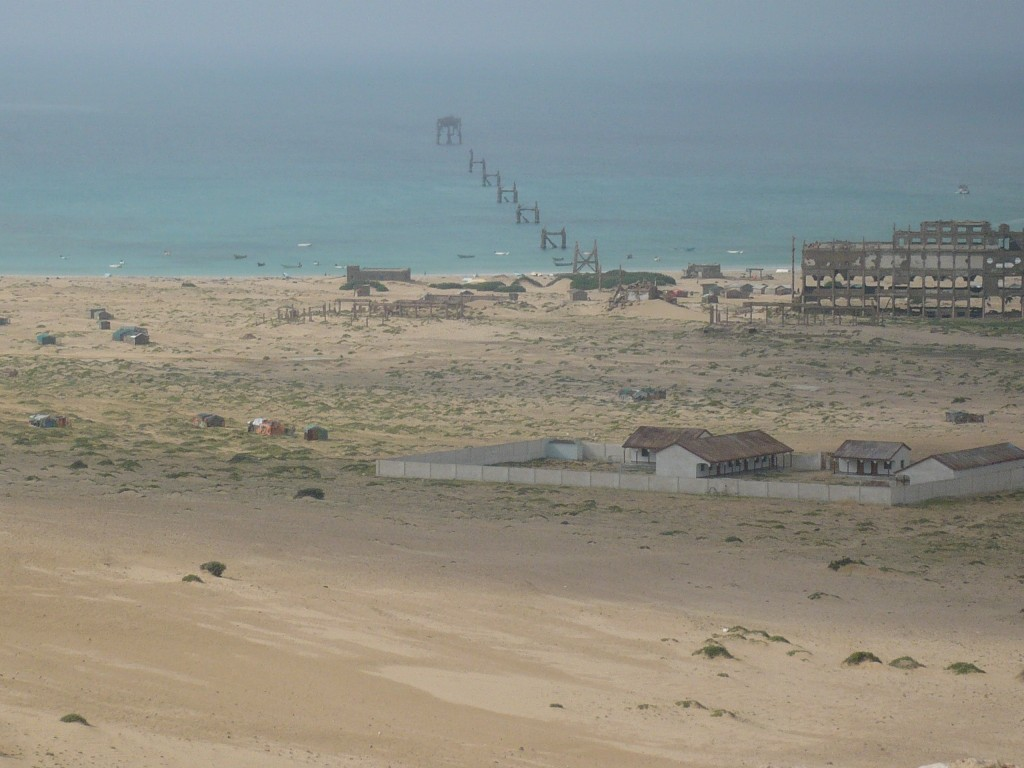
The Hafun Salt Factory, built in the 1930s.

The Hafun Fishing Company (HFC) was established in July 1992, in Bosaso. It was named after Hafun, where HFC also has an office. The firm exports a wide range of fish products to international markets. Among these are lobsters, frozen fish, dried shark meat, and fin, which it mainly sends to Yemen, the United Arab Emirates, and Oman, as well as some products to Kenya. The company is exploring additional global markets for its fish.

In late 2014, the Udug Ltd. Company, in conjunction with the United States–based REDD Engineering & Construction Incorporated, began conducting feasibility studies for the renovation of the salt production plants in Hafun, Hurdiyo, and other littoral areas in Puntland. The first phase of the initiative was completed in March 2015 and saw the historic salt works in both towns refurbished following community-wide consultations. According to the Puntland Ministry of Planning and International Cooperation, the project focuses on stimulating entrepreneurship and sustaining job creation. It was inspired by calls for national reinvestment by the Puntland presidential office and the Puntland Chamber of Commerce. Additionally, REDD Engineering official Lowry Redd indicated that the initiative's second phase aims to restore the Hafun plant to its place as one of the main global suppliers of salt.

== Transportation ==
In 2012, the Puntland Highway Authority (PHA) announced a project to connect Hafun and other coastal towns in Puntland to the main regional highway. The thoroughfare, which is 750 km (470 miles) long, would link major cities in the northern part of Somalia, such as Bosaso, Galkayo and Garowe, with towns in the south.

== See also ==
- Puntland
- Shell money
