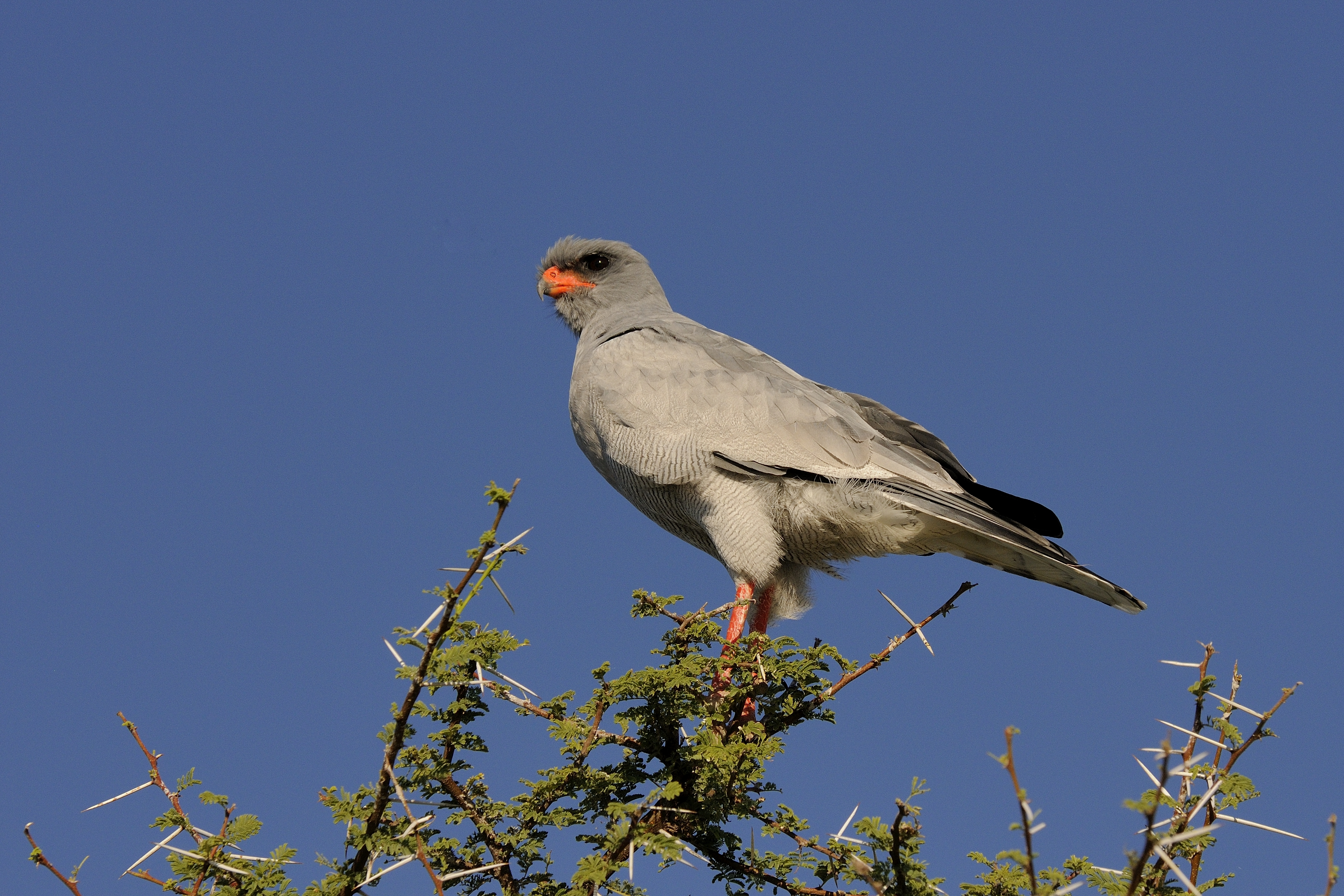

Conservation status
- Least Concern (IUCN 3.1)

Scientific classification
- Kingdom: Animalia
- Phylum: Chordata
- Class: Aves
- Order: Accipitriformes
- Family: Accipitridae
- Genus: Melierax
- Species: M. canorus

Binomial name
- Melierax canorus (Thunberg, 1799)

Subspecies
- M. c. argentior - Clancey, 1960; M. c. canorus - (Thunberg, 1799)

= Pale chanting goshawk =

Species of bird

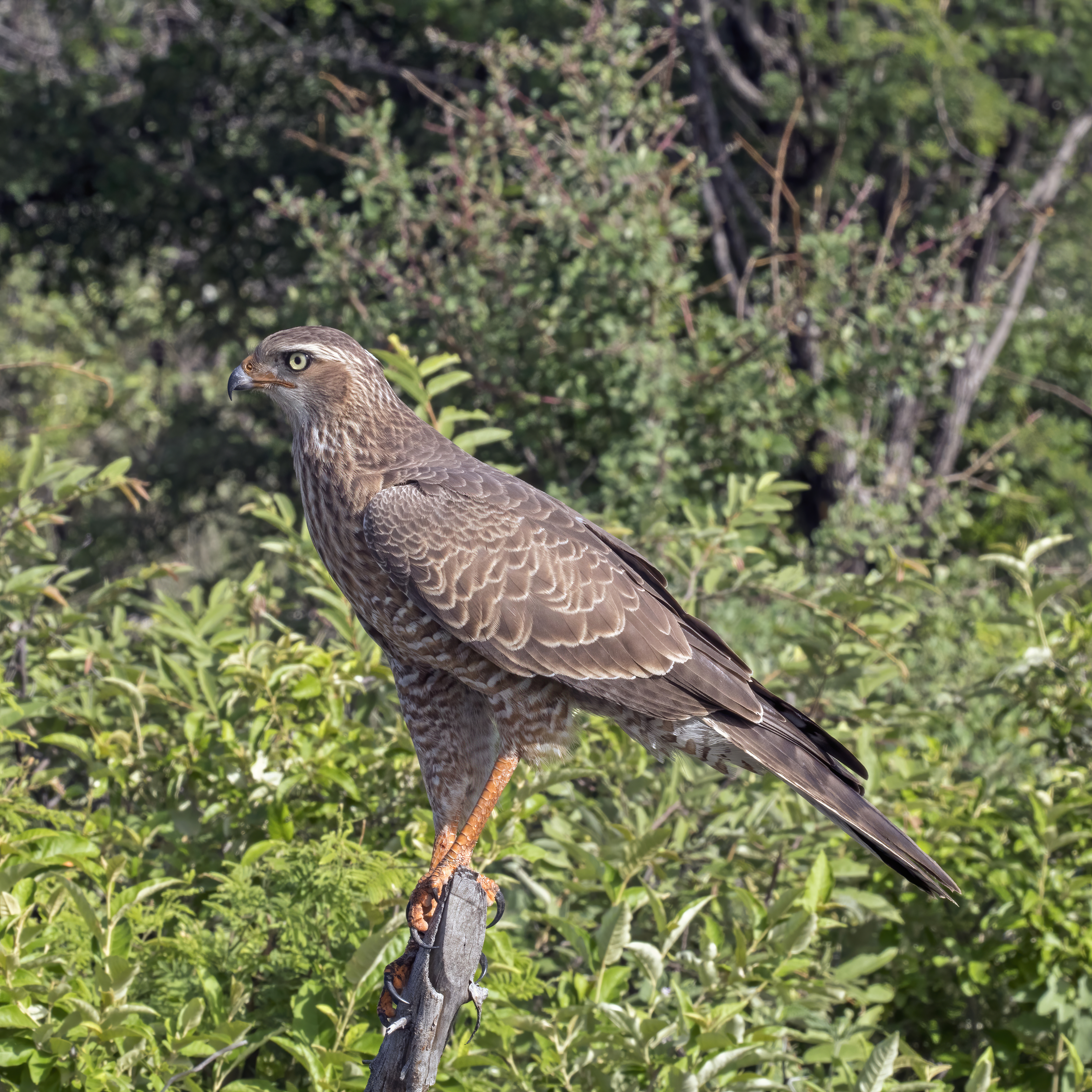
Juvenile M. c. argentor, Namibia

The pale chanting goshawk (Melierax canorus) is a bird of prey in the family Accipitridae. This hawk breeds in southern Africa and is a resident species of dry, open semi-desert with 75 cm or less annual rainfall. It is commonly seen perched on roadside telephone poles.

== Description ==
This species is approximately 55 cm in length with a wingspan of 110 cm. The adult has grey upperparts with a white rump. The central tail feathers are black tipped with white and the outer tail feathers are barred grey and white. The head and upper breast are pale grey while the rest of the underparts are finely barred in dark grey and white. The eyes are dark brown in the adult and pale yellow in the immature. The bill is red at the base and dark grey at the tip. The cere, facial skin and long legs are also red. In flight, the adult has black primary flight feathers, very pale grey (white from a distance) secondaries, and grey forewings. Immatures have brown upperparts, with a white rump and black bars on the tail. From below, the flight feathers and tail are white with black barring, the throat is dark-streaked white, and the rest of the underparts are rufous. It is larger and paler than the barred-rumped dark chanting goshawk, Melierax metabates.

Both sexes are vocal during the breeding season. The call is a tuneful whistling kleeu-kleeu-kleeu-ku-ku-ku usually given from a tree-top perch.

== Ecology ==
=== Food and foraging ===
The pale chanting goshawk hunts predominantly from elevated perches such as trees and telephone poles but also walks on the ground in pursuit of prey. It is an opportunistic raptor and eats a wide variety of prey including small mammals up to the size of Cape hares, lizards, birds, large insects and carrion. It has also been recorded predating upon tent tortoise and leopard tortoise hatchlings which are swallowed whole while the shell is still soft. There is some evidence of social hunting in breeding groups but solitary hunting is the norm. Pale chanting goshawks commonly associate with foraging honey badgers and feed on organisms that are flushed by the honey badger's feeding activity. This association increases the hunting opportunities and prey capture success of the pale chanting goshawk while the honey badger does not suffer any loss of foraging efficiency.

=== Breeding ===
The relatively small stick nest is built in a tree (often a Vachellia) at a height of 2 to 12 m or on a pole or pylon. Nests have been recorded being lined with soft materials including animal fur, dry dung, Cape penduline tit nests, man-made cloth and the silk nests of a social spider (Stegodyphus dumicola). The female lays and incubates two (occasionally one or three) chalky white, unmarked eggs. Usually only one chick is raised but nests raising two chicks are not uncommon. The breeding cycle begins in midwinter and takes over 115 days. After leaving the nest the young may be found near it for some months and in the following year may even display in the same area. Some pairs and especially trios raise a second brood, starting about 24 days after the first brood fledges.

Normally a female mates with a single male (monogamy), but in "broken veld" vegetation (a prey-rich habitat in the Little Karoo), a female and two males may form a polyandrous trio. In these cases an alpha male and female will be assisted in raising the young by a beta male. The alpha male copulates with the female 31–5 days before laying while the beta male copulates 5–3 days before laying. Subordinate co-breeding males may have reproductive fitness benefits by assisting the alpha female with nest defense and prey provision. Non-breeding individuals from previous broods may remain in their natal territory and form part of the breeding group.

== Habitat and abundance ==
Pale chanting goshawks have a large range throughout most of the drier regions of Southern Africa. They inhabit dry semi-desert areas with open ground and appropriate perches from which to hunt. There is no evidence of migration though both short and long-distance movements are common. In the Karoo one pair or family group occupies between 4.4 and 8.6 km^{2} while around Windhoek one pair occupies between 5.4 and 6.7 km^{2}.
