= ASET =

Aset or ASET may refer to:

- ASET (education), an awarding body
- Association of Science and Engineering Technology Professionals of Alberta (ASET) for technicians and technologists in Alberta, Canada
- ASET (professional body), an educational charity for placement and employability professionals in the United Kingdom
- Iset, an Ancient Egyptian name

== See also ==
- Asset (disambiguation)
- Isis, Aset being the Egyptian name for the goddess
- Iset (disambiguation), page for Egyptian name
