= Isis (disambiguation) =

Isis was a major goddess in ancient Egyptian religion.

Isis, isis, or ISIS commonly refers to:

- ISIS, or ISIL or IS, a transnational Salafi jihadist militant organisation and quasi-state

Isis, isis, or ISIS may also refer to:

== Arts, entertainment and media ==
=== Fictional entities ===
- Isis (Bluewater Comics)
- Isis (DC Comics)
- Isis (Marvel Comics)
- Isis (Stargate)
- Isis Eaglet, in Magical Chronicle Lyrical Nanoha Force
- Isis, a CIA project involving Mary Elizabeth Bartowski in TV drama series Chuck
- Isis, Catwoman's cat in Krypto the Superdog
- International Secret Intelligence Service, a spy agency in TV series Archer

=== Literature ===
- Isis (journal), on the history of science, medicine and technology
- Isis (journal, 1816), the first interdisciplinary journal in the German-speaking world
- The Isis Magazine, a student magazine at Oxford University

=== Music ===
- Isis (band), an American post-metal band
- Isis (horn-rock band), a 1970s all-female band
- Isis (Australian band)
- Lin Que or Isis, a hip-hop artist
- Isis (Lully), a 1677 opera by Jean-Baptiste Lully
- "Isis" (song), by Bob Dylan from the 1976 album Desire
- "Isis", a song by Delta-S from the 2007 album Voyage to Isis
- Is Is, a 2007 album by Yeah Yeah Yeahs, and the song "Isis"
- "ISIS" (song), by Joyner Lucas featuring Logic, 2019

=== Television ===
- The Secrets of Isis, originally broadcast as Isis, an American live-action superhero series
- "Isis", an episode of Smallville season 10

== Businesses and organizations ==
- Isis Innovation, later Oxford University Innovation, a British technology transfer company
- Institute for Science and International Security, an American non-governmental institution
- Institute for the Scientific Investigation of Sexuality, later Family Research Institute, an American socially conservative non-profit organization
- Institute for the Secularisation of Islamic Society, affiliated to the Center for Inquiry
- International Society for Iranian Studies or the Association for Iranian Studies, a U.S.-based academic organization
- International Species Information System, later Species360, an organization that maintains an online database of wild animals under human care
- Isis District State High School, in Childers, Queensland, Australia
- ISIS Group, later Adara Group, for improving health and education for people living in poverty
- Isis-Urania Temple, of the Hermetic Order of the Golden Dawn, an esoteric secret society

== Places ==
- Shire of Isis, a former local government area in Queensland, Australia
  - Electoral district of Isis, 1932–1992
  - Isis Highway
- Port of Isis, an ancient seaport and emporium in northern Somalia
- Isis River (disambiguation), several rivers
- The Isis, the upper part of the River Thames in Oxford, England
  - Isis Bridge
- Isis, Ohio, or Saint Charles, US

== Science and technology ==
=== Astronomy ===
- Isis (lunar crater), on the Moon
- Isis (Ganymede crater), on the moon of Jupiter
- 42 Isis, an asteroid

=== Computing ===
- ISIS (operating system), for early Intel processors
- CDS ISIS, a non-numerical information storage and retrieval software developed by UNESCO
- Image and Scanner Interface Specification
- Unity ISIS, a storage system for video files used by TV broadcasters
- Integrated Software for Imagers and Spectrometers, software to process data collected by NASA planetary missions
- IS-IS or ISIS, a network routing protocol
- ISIS/Draw, a chemical structure drawing program
- Softcard, formerly Isis Mobile Wallet, a mobile payment system
- Unity ISIS, a storage device
- Integrated Scientific Information System, software programs including the MDL Chime plug-in
- ISIS, a variant of the JOSS programming language

=== Other uses in science and technology ===
- Isis (coral), a genus
- Isis (reactor), a former research reactor at CEA Saclay in France
- ISIS (satellite), a series of Canadian satellites
- ISIS Neutron and Muon Source, at Harwell, England
- Integrated Science Investigation of the Sun (IS☉IS), an instrument aboard the Parker Solar Probe
- Integrated Secure Identification System, an undisclosed hidden security feature of the £1 coin
- International Studies of Infarct Survival, clinical trials

== Sports ==
- Isis Waterski Club, at Caversham Lakes, England
- Isis, the Oxford University reserve rowing crew at the Boat Race

== Transportation ==
- Isis (ship), a grain ship of Ancient Rome
- HMS Isis, the name of several Royal Navy ships
- USC&GS Isis, an early 20th-century survey ship
- Integrated Sensor is Structure, an American unmanned airship project
- Integrated standby instrument system, a backup instrument display for aircraft
- ISIS Drive or International Splined Interface Standard, a bicycle bottom bracket interface specification
- Morris Isis, a Morris car 1929–1931, and a British Motor Corporation car in the 1950s
- Toyota Isis, a seven-seat large MPV
- Isis railway line, a former narrow gauge line in Queensland, Australia

== Other uses ==
- Isis (given name), including a list of people with the name
  - Isis the Amazon (Lindsay Kay Hayward, born 1987), American actress and wrestler
- "Isis" of the Suebi, in Tacitus's book Germania
- Double Is or is-is, the usage of the word "is" twice in a row
- List of storms named Isis
- HM Prison Isis, a young offenders institution in London, England

== See also ==
- Isis and Osiris (disambiguation)
- Temple of Isis (disambiguation)
- Innovative Solutions In Space, or ISISPACE, a Dutch aerospace company
- Isis Temple, a prominence in the Grand Canyon in the US
- Iset, an Ancient Egyptian name of the goddess better known by her Greek name Isis
- Ist Ist, an English post-punk band
- Isyss, an American R&B group
- Azanus isis, a species of butterfly
- Hippotion isis, a species of moth
- Mysteries of Isis, religious initiation rites in the Greco-Roman world
- Name changes due to the Islamic State
- Names of the Islamic State
