= ISS (disambiguation) =

ISS is the International Space Station, a modular space station in low Earth orbit.

ISS may also refer to:

== Organizations ==
- Information Systems & Services, a former part of the UK Ministry of Defence
- Institute for Science and Society, an academic department at the University of Nottingham, England
- Institute for Security Studies, a think tank in South Africa
- Institute for Standardization of Serbia
- Institute of Social Studies, an international institute in The Hague, the Netherlands
- International Social Service, a charitable, non-governmental organisation
- Internal Security Service, national security intelligence agency of Oman
- Istituto Superiore di Sanità, the Italian National Institute of Health
- Intercollegiate Socialist Society, an American political youth organization (1905–1921)

== Businesses ==
- ISS A/S, a Danish service company
- Institutional Shareholder Services, a proxy advisory firm
- Internet Security Systems, a security software vendor

== Arts, media, and entertainment ==
- I.S.S. (film), an American science fiction thriller film
- International Staff Songsters, the flagship choir of the Salvation Army
- Incredible Shrinking Sphere, a 1989 video game
- International Superstar Soccer, a video game series
  - ISS (2000 video game)
- Idea Star Singer, a Malayalam music reality show by Asianet TV
- Imperial Star Ship, a fictional spaceship designation prefix in Star Trek's Mirror Universe

== Education ==
- ISS International School, an international school in Singapore
- In-school suspension, a form of discipline used in some schools
- Instituto San Sebastián Yumbel, a school in Chile

== Science and technology ==
- Ion scattering spectroscopy, or low-energy ion scattering, a materials analysis method
- Imaging Science Subsystem, Cassini–Huygens space probe instruments
- Instruction set simulator, a computer program that simulates a processor
- International Seismological Summary, an earthquake catalog
- Input Shaft Speed, the rotational speed of the input shaft in a vehicle

=== Medicine ===
- Idiopathic short stature, an unexplained short stature
- Injury Severity Score
- International Staging System, for the severity of multiple myeloma

== Other uses ==
- IShowSpeed, an American YouTuber and streamer (born 2005)
- Independent Subway System, a former rapid transit rail system in the United States
- Islamic State in Somalia, a faction of the Islamic State of Iraq and the Levant
- ISS Hockey (International Scouting Services), an ice hockey scouting service
- Air Italy (2005–2018), a former Italian airline (ICAO code: ISS)

== See also ==
- Isis (disambiguation)
- IIS (disambiguation)
