= Aethiopia =

Ancient Greek term for parts of Africa

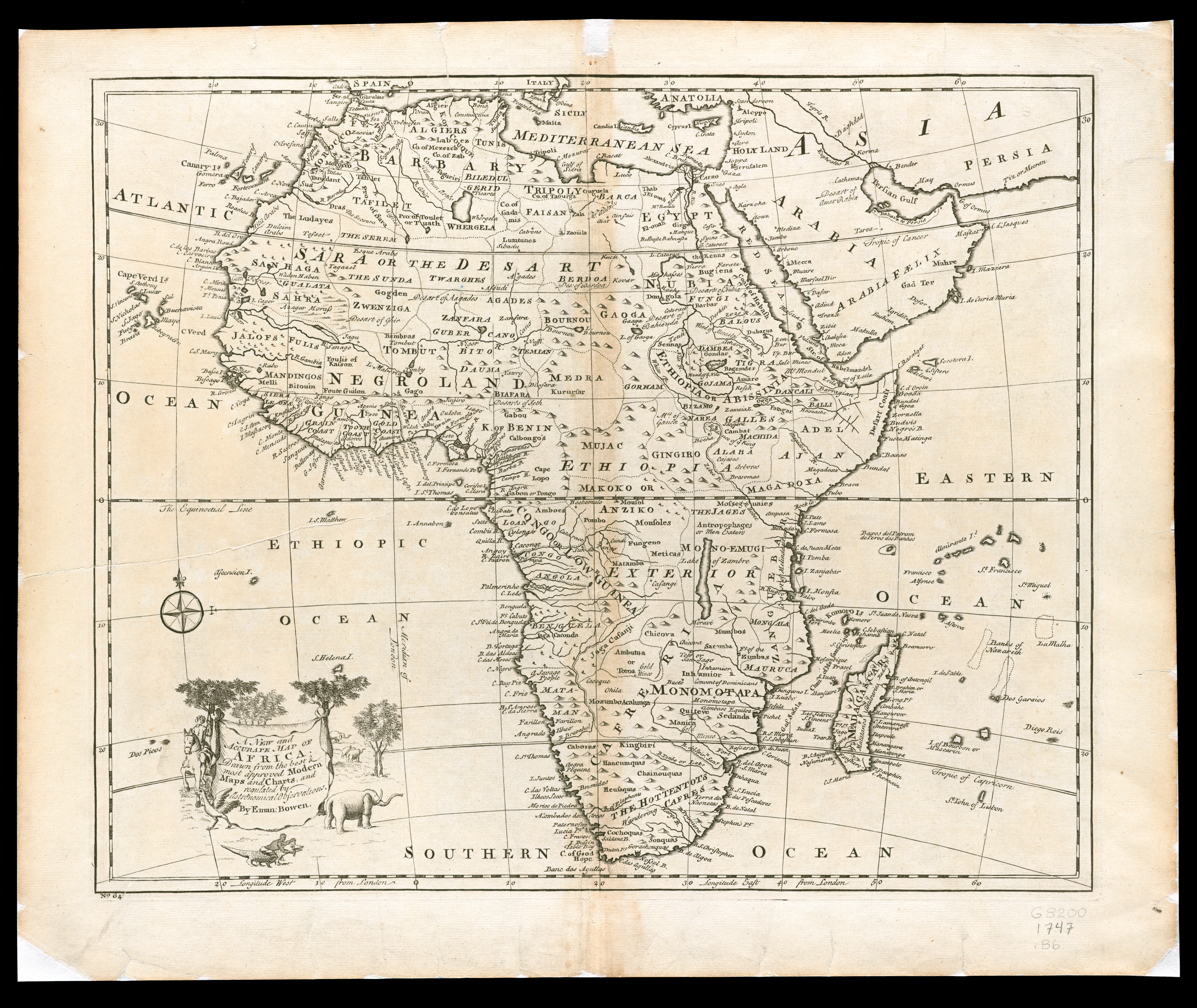
1747 map with all the oceans surrounding the African continent

Ancient Aethiopia (Greek: Αἰθιοπία, romanized: Aithiopía) first appears as a geographical term in classical documents in reference to the skin color of the inhabitants of the upper Nile in Egypt and Sudan, areas south of the Sahara, and less often to certain parts of Asia. Its earliest mention is in the works of Homer: twice in the Iliad, and three times in the Odyssey. The Greek historian Herodotus uses the appellation "Aethiopian" to refer to people of regions south of Egypt, most commonly Nubia. Despite this, the Byzantine Greeks also started to call the Aksumites Ethiopians after Negus Ezana conquered Meroë in 330 AD and took on the title of "king of Ethiopia" from the Nubians (modern-day Sudan). Greco-Roman sources also report the existence of 'White Aethiopians' in Africa. By the modern period, the term Aethiopian Sea was used to refer to the southern Atlantic Ocean, particularly the area adjacent to West Africa.

Though near universally used to invoke the "Aethiopia of Africa" ("African Aethiopia"), there was another region sometimes called Asiatic Aethiopia, located somewhere in 'the East'. According to Herodotus: "the Aethiopians from the East are straight-haired, but those of Libya [Africa] have hair more thick and woolly than that of any other men." The Greek geographer Strabo noted in a similar vein that "As for the people of India, those in the south are like the Aethiopians in colour, although they are like the rest in respect to countenance and hair (for on account of the humidity of the air their hair does not curl), whereas those in the north are like the Aegyptians."

Unlike the earlier Greek writers who distinguished Aethiopians (Nubians) from other types of Africans, Claudius Ptolemy (90–168 AD), a Roman citizen of Greek culture who lived in Alexandria, used "Aethiopia" as a generic term for Sub-Saharan Africa. In his Tetrabiblos, he tried to explain the physical characteristics of people around the world saying, 'They are consequently black in complexion, and have thick and curled hair ... and they are called by the common name of Aethiopians.'"

Pseudo-Jerome in the 4th century or later referred to the region of Colchis as the "Other Aethiopia" (altera Aethiopia), or, in the Greek translation of Pseudo-Sophronius, the "Second Aethiopia" (ἐν τῇ δευτέρᾳ Αἰθιοπίᾳ).

== Etymology ==
The inhabited world according to Herodotus: Libya (Africa) is imagined as extending no further south than the Horn of Africa, terminating in what was believed to be the uninhabitable desert.

The Greek name Aithiopia (Αἰθιοπία, from Αἰθίοψ, Aithíops) is a compound derived of two Greek words: αἴθω, aíthō, 'I burn' + ὤψ, ṓps, 'face'. According to the Perseus Digital Library, this designation properly translates in noun form as burnt-face and in adjectival form as red-brown. As such, it was used as a vague term for darker skinned populations than the Greeks since the time of Homer. (Note: “Αἰθιοπῆες” Homer, Iliad, 1.423, whence nom. “Αἰθιοπεύς” Call.Del.208: (αἴθω, ὄψ):—properly, Burnt-face, i.e. Ethiopian, negro, Hom., etc.; prov., Αἰθίοπα σμήχειν 'to wash a blackamoor white', Lucian, Adversus indoctum et libros multos ementem, 28. (Lidell and Scott 1940). Cf. Etymologicum Genuinum s.v. Αἰθίοψ, Etymologicum Gudianum s.v. Αἰθίοψ. "Αἰθίοψ". Etymologicum Magnum (in Greek). Leipzig. 1818.) The term was applied to such peoples within the range of observation of the ancient geographers, primarily in what was then Nubia (in ancient Sudan). With the expansion of geographical knowledge, the exonym successively extended to certain other areas below the Sahara. In classical antiquity, the term Africa did not refer to any part of sub-Saharan Africa, but rather, in its widest sense, to Ancient Libya—what is now known as the Maghreb and the desert to the south.

== Before Herodotus ==
Homer (c. 8th century BC) is the first to mention "Aethiopians" (Αἰθίοπες, Αἰθιοπῆες), writing that they are to be found at the east and west extremities of the world, divided by the sea into "eastern" (at the sunrise) and "western" (at the sunset). In Book 1 of the Iliad, Thetis visits Olympus to meet Zeus, but the meeting is postponed, as Zeus and other gods are absent, visiting the land of the Aethiopians. Meanwhile, in Book 1 of the Odyssey, Athena convinces Zeus to let Odysseus finally return home only because Poseidon is away in Aithiopia and unable to object.

Hesiod (c. 8th century BC) speaks of Memnon as the "King of the Aethiopians." In The Catalogues of Women, he stated that the Egyptian king Epaphus was the progenitor of the Aethiopians and other dark-skinned tribes of Libya. He wrote:

The Sons of Boreas pursued the Harpies to the lands of the Massagetae and of the proud Half-Dog men, of the Underground-folk and of the feeble Pygmies; and to the tribes of the boundless Black-skins and the Libyans. Huge Earth bare these to Epaphus -- soothsaying people, knowing seercraft by the will of Zeus the lord of oracles, but deceivers, to the end that men whose thought passes their utterance might be subject to the gods and suffer harm -- Aethiopians and Libyans and mare-milking Scythians. For verily Epaphus was the child of the almighty Son of Cronos, and from him sprang the dark Libyans, and high-souled Aethiopians, and the Underground-folk and feeble Pygmies. All these are the offspring of the lord, the Loud-thunderer.

The Assyrian king Esarhaddon when conquering Egypt and destroying the Kushite Empire states how he "deported all 'Aethiopians' from Egypt, leaving not one to pay homage to me". He was talking about the Nubian 25th Dynasty rather than people from modern Ethiopia.

In 515 BC, Scylax of Caryanda, on orders from Darius I of the Achaemenid Empire, sailed along the Indus River, Indian Ocean, and Red Sea, circumnavigating the Arabian Peninsula. He mentioned "Aethiopians", though his writings on them have not survived.

Hecataeus of Miletus (c. 500 BC) is also said to have written a book about 'Aethiopia,' but his writing is now known only through quotations from later authors. He stated that 'Aethiopia' was located to the east of the Nile, as far as the Red Sea and Indian Ocean. He is also quoted as relating a myth in which the Skiapods ('Shade feet'), whose feet were supposedly large enough to serve as shade, lived there.

== In Herodotus ==
In his Histories (c. 440 BC), Herodotus presents some of the most ancient and detailed information about "Aethiopia". He relates that he personally traveled up the Nile to the border of Egypt as far as Elephantine (modern Aswan). In his view, "Aethiopia" is all of the inhabited land found to the south of Egypt, beginning at Elephantine. He describes a capital at Meroë, adding that the only deities worshipped there were Zeus (Amun) and Dionysus (Osiris). He relates that in the reign of Pharaoh Psamtik I (c. 650 BCE), many Egyptian soldiers deserted their country and settled amidst the Aethiopians.

Herodotus remarked on shared cultural practices between the Egyptians and Ethiopians, also stating that out of "three hundred and thirty kings" of Egypt, there had been 18 Ethiopian kings, one native Egyptian queen, and the rest had been Egyptian men.

Herodotus tells us that king Cambyses II (c. 570 BC) of the Achaemenid Empire sent spies to the Aethiopians "who dwelt in that part of Libya (Africa) which borders upon the southern sea." They found a strong and healthy people. Although Cambyses then campaigned toward their country, by not preparing enough provisions for the long march, his army completely failed and returned quickly.

In Book 3, Herodotus defines "Aethiopia" as the farthest region of "Libya" (i.e. Africa):

Where the south declines towards the setting sun lies the country called Aethiopia, the last inhabited land in that direction. There gold is obtained in great plenty, huge elephants abound, with wild trees of all sorts, and ebony; and the men are taller, handsomer, and longer lived than anywhere else.

Herodotus also wrote that the Ammonians of Siwa Oasis are "colonists from Egypt and Aethiopia and speak a language compounded of the tongues of both countries".

Herodotus also refers to "the Aethiopians of Asia" (or "Ethiopians of the East"), who are said to be straight-haired, whereas the Aethiopians from Libya (Africa) have "the woolliest hair of all men".

Herodotus wrote with regard to the inhabitants of Libya (the Greek name for Africa): "One thing I can add about this far country [Libya]: so far as one knows, it is inhabited by four races, and four only, of which two are indigenous and two not. The indigenous peoples are the Libyans and Ethiopians, the former occupying the northerly, the latter the more southerly parts; the immigrants are the Phoenicians and Greeks."

=== Relationship with Macrobia ===
According to Herodotus, the Macrobians dwelt geographically along the sea south of Libya on the Atlantic. This Libya was far south of the Pillars of Hercules and Atlas Mountains along the Atlantic coast, while the northern Libyan sea coast was the Mediterranean Sea that stretched from Egypt to Morocco in an east to west direction. Concerning the southern sea, Herodotus places the Persians east of the southern sea in Asia, the Arabians & East Africans south of the sea in Arabia and the Macrobians west of the southern Sea in Libya. Herodotus also stated that the Macrobians were indigenous to southern Libya while the Libyans along the Mediterranean Sea were indigenous to northern Libya.

According to his account, the Persian Emperor Cambyses II upon his conquest of Egypt (525 BC) sent ambassadors to Macrobia, bringing luxury gifts for its king to entice his submission. The Macrobian ruler, who was elected based at least in part on stature, replied instead with a challenge for his Persian counterpart in the form of an unstrung bow: if the Persians could manage to string it, they would have the right to invade his country; but until then, they should thank the gods that the Macrobians never decided to invade their empire. This is similar to an account of the Nubians challenging foreigners to draw and fire their great bows, but the fact Cambyses is said to have already conquered at least part of Aethiopia makes connecting Nubia and the Macrobians untennable.

Later authors such as Pseudo-Scylax in his periplus also place the Aethiopians south of the Pillars of Hercules, and Pseudo-Scylax also reported a trade taking place between Phoenicians (Carthaginians) and tall Aethiopians. Herodotus also mentions a silent trade of gold that took place between Carthaginians and natives south of Libya beyond the Pillars of Hercules; it was also this gold trade that motivated Cambyses, the King of Persia, to plan a land and sea expedition against both the Carthaginians and Macrobians. Pliny in his natural histories places them west of Meroe, far west of Meroe beyond the deserts of Chad that is. Cambyses, after being insulted by the tallest and long-lived (Macrobian) King of Ethiopia in the west, he eagerly wanted to conquer and subdue all people of Amun and destroy all temples of the God, but failed in his desperate attempt. And although Cambyses had departed from Susa to invade and conquer the land of Egypt by crossing the Sinai desert and afterwards departing from Egypt to reach the southern realms of Ethiopia south of Egypt, he was still far away from the land of the Macrobians, who dwelt beyond the vast Sahara desert at the ends of the earth as far as the Ocean towards the western sunset.

== Other Greco-Roman historians and primary accounts ==
The Egyptian priest Manetho (c. 300 BC) listed Kushite (25th) dynasty, calling it the "Aethiopian dynasty," and Esarhaddon the early 7th century BC ruler of the Neo-Assyrian Empire describes deporting all "Aethiopians" from Egypt upon conquering Egypt from the Nubian Kushite Empire which formed the 25th Dynasty. Moreover, when the Hebrew Bible was translated into Greek (c. 200 BC), the Hebrew appellation "Kush, Kushite" became in Greek "Aethiopia, Aethiopians", appearing as "Ethiopia, Ethiopians" in the English King James Version.

Agatharchides provides a relatively detailed description of the gold mining system of Aethiopia. His text was copied almost verbatim by virtually all subsequent ancient writers on the area, including Diodorus Siculus and Photius.

Diodorus Siculus in his work Bibliotheca Historica, reported that the Ethiopians claimed that Egypt was an early colony, and that the Ethiopians also cited evidence that they were more ancient than the Egyptians as he wrote:

"The Ethiopians say that the Egyptians are one of their colonies which was brought into Egypt by Osiris".

He recounted this story that attributes the origins of Egyptian civilization to migrants from the south, which in this context corresponds to the Kingdom of Kush.

Diodorus Siculus also discussed the similar cultural practices between the Ethiopians and Egyptians such as the writing systems as he states "We must now speak about the Ethiopian writing which is called hieroglyphic among the Egyptians, in order that we may omit nothing in our discussion of their antiquities".

Achilles Tatius described the complexion of the Egyptian herdsmen near Alexandria as "dark-coloured (yet not absolutely black like an Indian but more like a bastard Ethiopian)".

With regard to the Ethiopians, Strabo indicates that they looked similar to Indians, remarking "those who are in Asia (South India), and those who are in Africa, do not differ from each other." Pliny in turn asserts that the place-name "Aethiopia" was derived from one "Aethiop, a son of Vulcan" (the Greek god Hephaestus). He also writes that the "Queen of the Ethiopians" bore the title Kandake, and avers (incorrectly) that the Ethiopians had conquered ancient Syria and the Mediterranean. Following Strabo, the Greco-Roman historian Eusebius claims that the Ethiopians had emigrated into the Red Sea area from the Indus Valley and that there were no people in the region by that name prior to their arrival.

Physiognomonics, a Greek treatise traditionally attributed to Aristotle, but now of disputed ownership made an observation on the physical nature of the Egyptians and Ethiopians with the view that "Those who are too black are cowards, like for the instance, the Egyptians and Ethiopians"

The Greek travelogue from the 1st-century AD, known as the Periplus of the Erythraean Sea, initially describes the littoral, based on its author's intimate knowledge of the area. However, the Periplus does not mention any dark-skinned "Ethiopians" among the area's inhabitants. They only later appear in Ptolemy's Geographia in a region far south, around the "Bantu nucleus" of northern Mozambique.

Arrian, wrote in the 1st-century AD that "The appearance of the inhabitants is also not very different in India and Ethiopia: the southern Indians are rather more like Ethiopians as they are black to look on, and their hair is black; only they are not so snub-nosed or woolly-haired as the Ethiopians; the northern Indians are most like the Egyptians physically".

The Ezana Stone, a stele documenting the reign of Ezana of Axum states the following:

I, Ezana, King of the Kingdom of Aksum and Himyarites and of Reeidan and of the Ethiopians and of the Sabaites and of Sileel (?) and of Hasa and of the Bougaites and of Taimo...

— Greek inscription of Ezana.

The terms King and Kingdom of Ethiopia would later be used by, among others, Amda Seyon I and Zara Yaqob. Early in the history of Italian Eritrea the name "Nuova Etiopia" (New Ethiopia) was proposed.

Also the Roman Christian Pseudo-Jerome and his translator Pseudo-Sophronius referred to Colchis as the "other Ethiopia" or "second Ethiopia".

Stephanus of Byzantium, from the 6th-century AD, had written that "Ethiopia was the first established country on earth; and the Ethiopians were the first to set up the worship of the gods and to establish laws."

Manilius, a Roman poet wrote in his Astronomicon "The Ethiopians stain the world and depict a race of men steeped in darkness; less sun-burnt are the natives of India; the land of Egypt, flooded by the Nile, darkens bodies more mildly owing to the inundation of its fields: it is a country nearer to us and its moderate climate imparts a medium tone."

Philostratus (c. 170 – c. 245 AD) had written in his journeys and life of Apollonios of Tyana, he had at one point arrived at "the crossing point between Ethiopia and Egypt, which is called Kaminos", where at a marketplace the Ethiopians and Egyptians would trade and barter products. It was seen that "those who live at the border of the two countries are not quite black, but of the same color as each other, since they are less black than the Ethiopians, but more so than the Egyptians."

== In literature ==
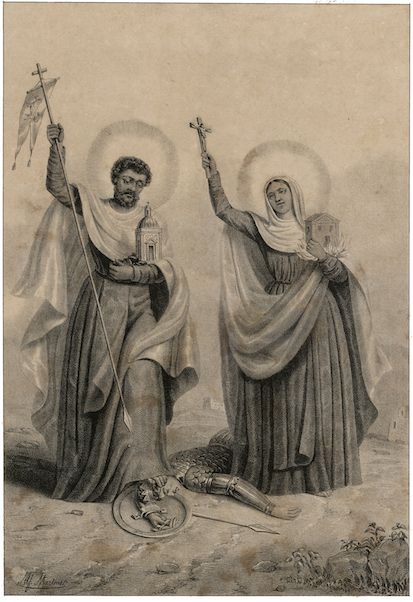
Brazilian painting of Saint Kaleb of Axum slaying the king of Himyar beside Ephigenia of Ethiopia. He carries a banner of the lion of judah holding a cross, attested in the late medieval period.

Several personalities in Greek and medieval literature were identified as Aethiopian, including several rulers, male and female:

- Memnon and his brother, Emathion, King of Arabia.
- Cepheus, King of Aethiopia, his wife Cassiopeia, and their daughter Andromeda, were named as members of the Aethiopian royal family.
- Homer in his description of the Trojan War mentions several other Aethiopians.
- Ephigenia of Ethiopia, is a Western folk saint whose life is told in the Golden Legend as a virgin converted to Christianity and then consecrated to God by Matthew the Apostle, who was spreading the Gospel to the region. (Note: According to the Encyclopædia Britannica (2009 Ultimate Reference Suite): "Tradition notes his ministry in Judaea, after which he supposedly missioned to the East, suggesting Ethiopia and Persia. Legend differs as to the scene of his missions and as to whether he died a natural or a martyr's death.")

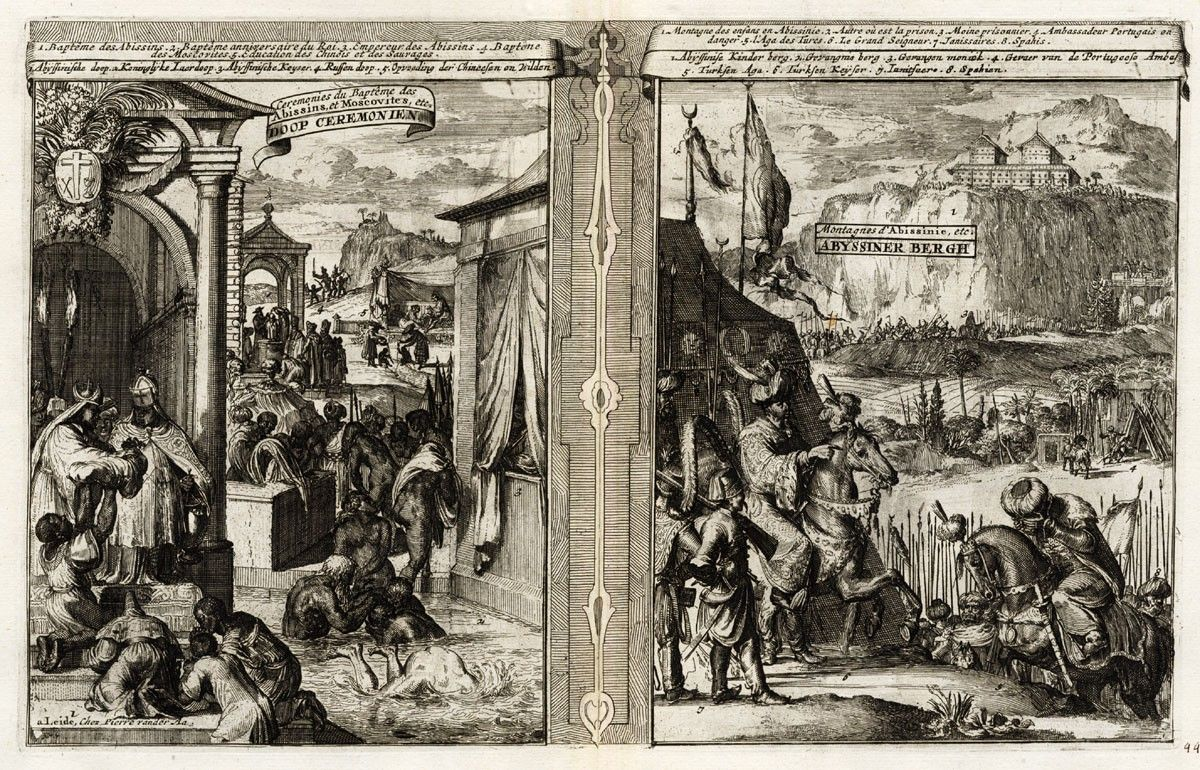
European depiction of Amba Geshen, captioned "Abyssinian mountain of children" in French and Dutch

- An account of Amba Geshen was published in Purchas, His Pilgrimage where it was called Mount Amara, where medieval Amhara kings of Ethiopia used to be imprisoned. This was stated by Pakenham to have inspired John Milton's description of Paradise in Paradise Lost, and later, "Mount Abora" in Samuel Taylor Coleridge's Kubla Khan.

"Nor where Abassin Kings thir issue Guard,

Mount Amara, though this by som suppos'd

True Paradise under the Ethiop Line"

— John Milton

== See also ==
- Aethiopian Sea
- Name of Ethiopia
- Ethiopian historiography
- History of Ethiopia
- Sigelwara Land
- Sub-Saharan Africa
- White Aethiopians
- Black people in ancient Roman history
- Nubia
- Land of Punt
