= IS2 (disambiguation) =

IS2 or IS-2 may refer to:

- IS-2, the first Soviet heavy tank model of the IS tank series
- IS-2 Mucha, a Polish training glider from 1947
- URMV-3 IS-2, a Romanian 1950s training glider
- HMG Information Assurance Standard No.2, a British government security standard
- Rotax 912 iS2, a light aircraft engine

== See also ==
- Isis (disambiguation)
- ISS (disambiguation)
- I²S, an electrical serial bus interface standard
