= HECSU =

UK higher education research charity

Higher Education Careers Service Unit
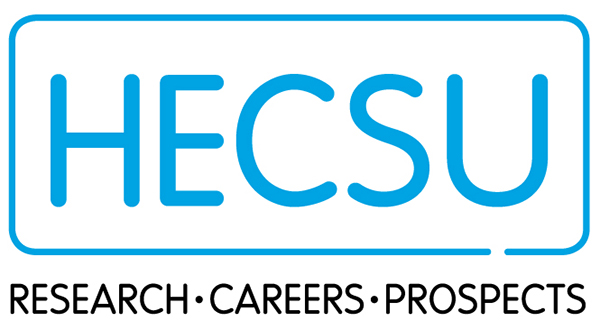
- HECSU logo
- Abbreviation: HECSU
- Formation: 1972
- Legal status: Non-profit organisation and registered charity
- Purpose: Careers research of graduates in the UK and supporting graduate recruitment via university careers services
- Location: Prospects House, Booth Street, Manchester, M13 9EP
- Region served: UK and Republic of Ireland
- Members: Higher education institutions and graduate employers
- Chief Executive: Jayne Rowley
- Chair: Prof Mark Smith
- Main organ: HECSU Board
- Parent organization: Universities UK and GuildHE
- Affiliations: AGCAS
- Website: HECSU

The Higher Education Careers Service Unit was an independent research charity based in Manchester for the United Kingdom and Republic of Ireland, specialising in higher education and graduate employment. It funded research projects for the higher education careers sector, and conducted research into graduate employment and career decision-making on behalf of its own members and external funding bodies.

It was a registered charity, formed in 1972, and was an agency of Universities UK and GuildHE. The commercial part of HECSU, CSU, changed its name to Graduate Prospects in July 2003. In 2020 HECSU merged with Jisc. HECSU as an entity was then dissolved as JIsc took on their charitable objectives.

Its most recognisable function is to produce the Prospects series of booklets with information about graduate careers. Graduate Prospects is the commercial arm of HECSU and provides careers information and services to students, graduates, university careers advisory services, employers and others.

The group produces statistical information on the destination of graduates from particular universities and courses.

The research strategy adopted by HECSU has five themes:

- Practitioner research
- Labour market information
- Careers guidance
- International comparisons
- Career learning and development

HECSU aims to:

- Improve the dissemination of information about higher education and graduate employment
- Contribute to knowledge of student and graduate career development and employment by conducting and commissioning research
- Work with careers advisers, academic staff, and employers to support graduate employability

Main work includes:

- Higher Education Degree Datacheck
- Prospects Luminate

== NCWE ==
NCWE
- Type: Division of a registered charity
- Founded: 2002
- Headquarters: Manchester, England, United Kingdom
- Website: www.work-experience.org

== See also ==
- Higher Education Statistics Agency
- List of UK Careers Advisory Services
- Association of Graduate Careers Advisory Services
- ASET (professional body)
