= Port of Isis =

Ancient port in modern Somaliland

- Location within Somaliland
- 10°23′N 44°25′E
- Type: Seaport and Emporium
- Periods: 1st century AD
- Cultures: Ancient Somali, Barbaria, Ancient Somali city-states
- Location: Bulhar, Berbera District, Sahil Region, Somaliland

The Port of Isis (Latin: Isidis Portus) was an ancient seaport and emporium in northern Somalia along the Gulf of Aden. Mentioned in Roman records as early as the 1st century AD, it is primarily known from Pliny in his Natural History. According to Pliny, it was a center of myrrh commerce, from which it exported to the Troglodytes of the Red sea. Its name comes from the ancient Egyptian goddess Isis, though the reason for the connection between Isis and the Port is unknown. It has been identified with the modern coastal town of Bulhar, situated between Berbera and Zeila in the Sahil region of Somaliland.

== Etymology ==
The name "Port of Isis" (Latin: Isidis Portus) derived from the portus and of the Isis. Isis is a Greco-Roman form of Iset, a major ancient Egyptian deity. The connection of the two is unknown. Even Strabo, in his Geographica, names a river in the modern Cape Gaurdafui in Northeastern Somalia as Isis, which at its bank produced myrrh and frankincense.

== History ==
Pliny

Pliny, in his Natural history, mentioned the Port of Isis in the following passage:

“Next there is a bay in the coast of Ethiopia that has not been explored, which is surprising, in view of the fact that traders ransack more remote districts; and a cape on which is a spring named Cucios, resorted to by seafarers; and further on, Port of Isis, ten days' row distant from Aduliton, and a centre to which the Trogodytae's myrrh is brought. There are two islands off the harbour called the False Pylae, and two inside it called the Pylae, on one of which are some stone monuments with inscriptions in an unknown alphabet.

Samuel Sharpe suggests that the old inscriptions at the Port of Isis islands were probably hieroglyphic. No later Greco-Roman accounts, such as the Periplus or Ptolemy in his Geography, mention the Port of Isis. The Port of Isis might have declined due to the rise of new trading centers and ports along northern Somalia's coast, which may have taken its prominence in the incense trade route.

== Identification with Bulhar ==
Bulhar is considered the probable location of the ancient Port of Isis. It might have been a thriving marketplace due to its roadstead; however, the modern Bulhar only emerged as a settlement during the 19th century.

== See also ==
- Portus, a large artificial harbour complex of Ancient Rome located at the mouth of the Tiber on the Tyrrhenian Sea
