= White Aethiopians =

Roman exonym

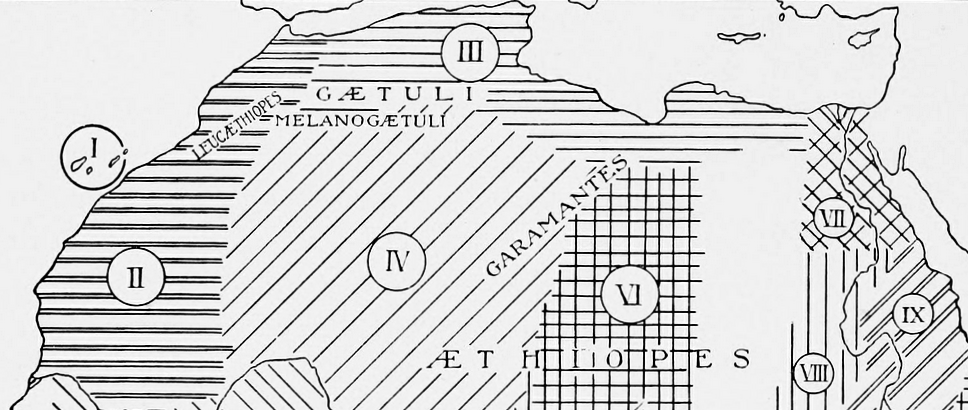
Location of the White Aethiopians in the Maghreb near Morocco, with the Gaetulians and Garamantes to their east and the Aethiopians across the Sahel region (Oric Bates, 1914)

White Aethiopians (Λευκαιθίοπες; Leucæthiopes) is a term found in ancient Greco-Roman literature, which may have referred to various light-complexioned populations inhabiting the Aethiopia region of antiquity. The exonym is used by Pliny the Elder, and is also mentioned by Pomponius Mela, Ptolemy and Orosius. These authorities do not, however, agree on the geographical location of the White Aethiopians.

Medieval geographers, including Ibn Hawqal and Leo Africanus, similarly noted the existence of various "white" or "olive" groups and individuals in territories and kingdoms south of the Sahara. However, the fate of these inhabitants is uncertain.

== Classical origins ==
Pliny the Elder wrote in section 5.8 of his Natural History that:

If we pass through the interior of Africa in a southerly direction, beyond the Gætuli, after having traversed the intervening deserts, we shall find, first of all the Liby-Egyptians, and then the country where the Leucæthiopians dwell.

Oric Bates notes that Ptolemy wrote of the White Aethiopians and the Melanogaetulians, and compares this to the mention by Orosius of the Libyoaethopians. Bates places the White Aethiopians in Morocco and the Melanogaetulians just to the east of them, claiming Ptolemy's authority for this, and arguing that "These descriptives are good evidence of the ancient opposition of whites and blacks in the Sahara, and of their fusion." Bates further compares these claims with what he argues is the "marked xanthochroid element of foreign (Nordic) origin" in Morocco, i.e. a mixing of light-skinned people from Northern Europe.

Pomponius Mela wrote, in Frank E. Romer's translation, that "On those shores washed by the Libyan Sea, however, are found the Libyan Aegyptians, the White Aethiopians, and, a populous and numerous nation, the Gaetuli. Then a region, uninhabitable in its entire length, covers a broad and vacant expanse."

Both Herodotus and Strabo "speak of two Ethiopias, one eastern, the other western". Strabo also said that the ancient Greeks "designated as Ethiopia the whole of the southern countries towards the ocean", not just a region near Egypt. Ephorus asserted that the White Ethiopians came from the Far East. Philostratus claimed that "The Indians are the wisest of mankind. The Ethiopians are a colony of them".

== Medieval geography ==
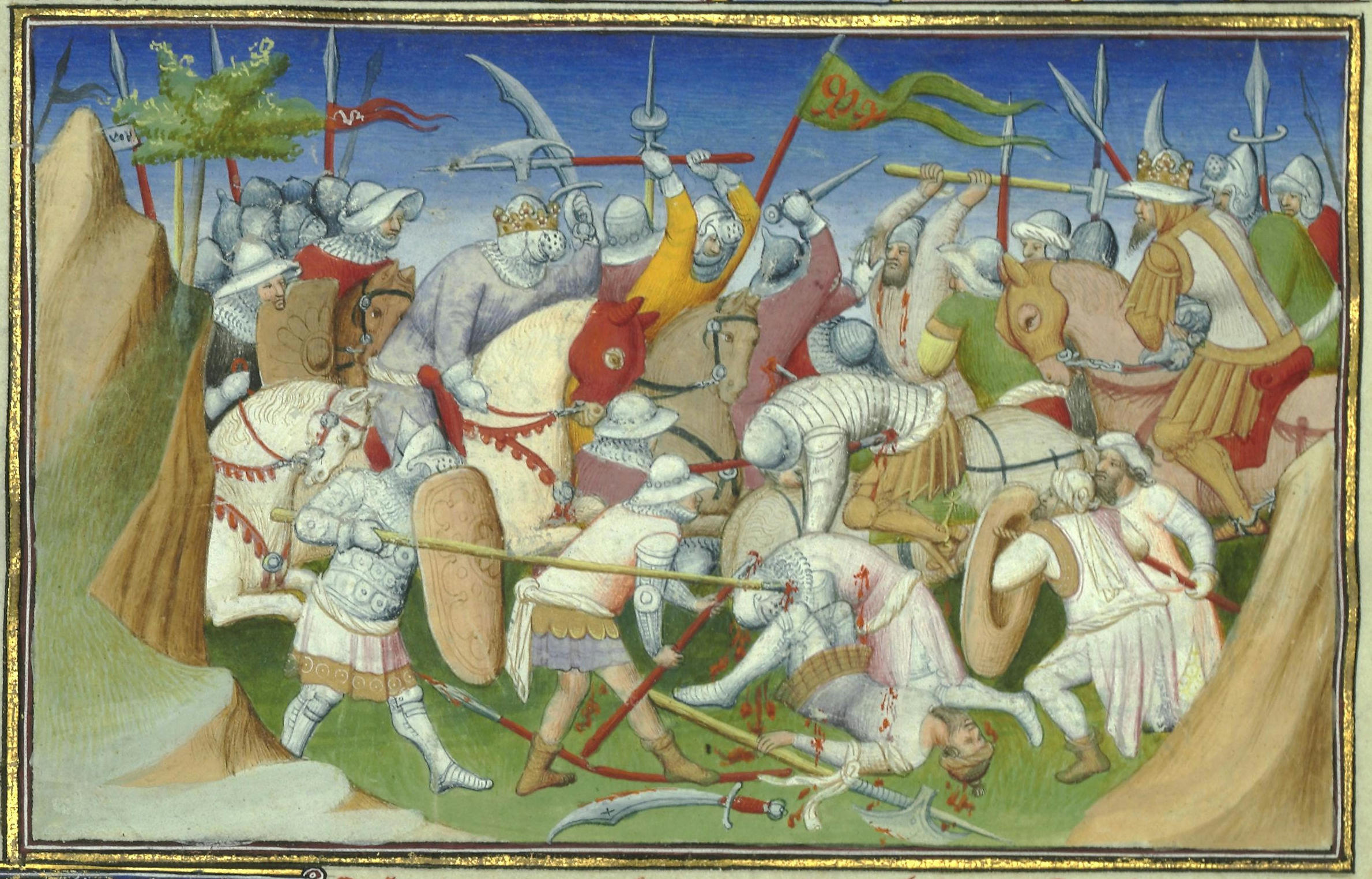
A sultan and his forces (right) battling the Abyssinian King and his men (Le Livre des Merveilles, 15th century). Leo Africanus wrote that "olive" complexioned people were among the natives of the kingdoms in the Horn of Africa.

According to Richard Smith, Ibn Hawqal, a 10th-century traveller from Baghdad, divides the Berber clans into "the pure Sanhaja and the Banu Tanamak", the latter being "originally Sudan (i.e. black) whose skin and complexion became white because they live close to the North". Smith reports Ibn Hawqal as listing 22 named kinds of Banu Tanamak, but without saying whether they were "political, cultural, geographic, social, or linguistic in nature". Smith suggests that the most likely scenario is that these ancient Ethiopian tribes, as represented today by the Haratin, were absorbed into Berber communities. Thus, he posits that Ibn Hawqal's "strange report of the Banu Tanamak", who changed from black to white, may have echoed "a real event, the absorption of tribes". Robert Brown likewise argues that "the "white" Berbers referred to may be only survivals of the original stock now reduced to duskiness by the infusion of Arab and Sudanic blood".

The 16th century explorer Leo Africanus described the existence of various "white" or "olive" groups and individuals inhabiting territories and kingdoms south of the Sahara. Besides the "white, tawney Moores" of the former Africa Proconsulare, he indicates that such light-complexioned peoples were concentrated in the Horn of Africa, comprising much of the Adal Sultanate's native populace and a significant portion of the denizens of the Mogadishu Sultanate. Outside of these areas, Leo Africanus writes that most of the inhabitants were Cafri. He further asserts that pockets of other "white" or "olive"-skinned residents could nonetheless also be found on two small islands north of Socotra ("the two sisters"), in parts of the Zanguebar coast (the Kingdom of Melinde and on the island of Quiloa), and among descendants of Chinese settlers on the island of Saint Laurence (Madagascar).

== Modern interpretations ==
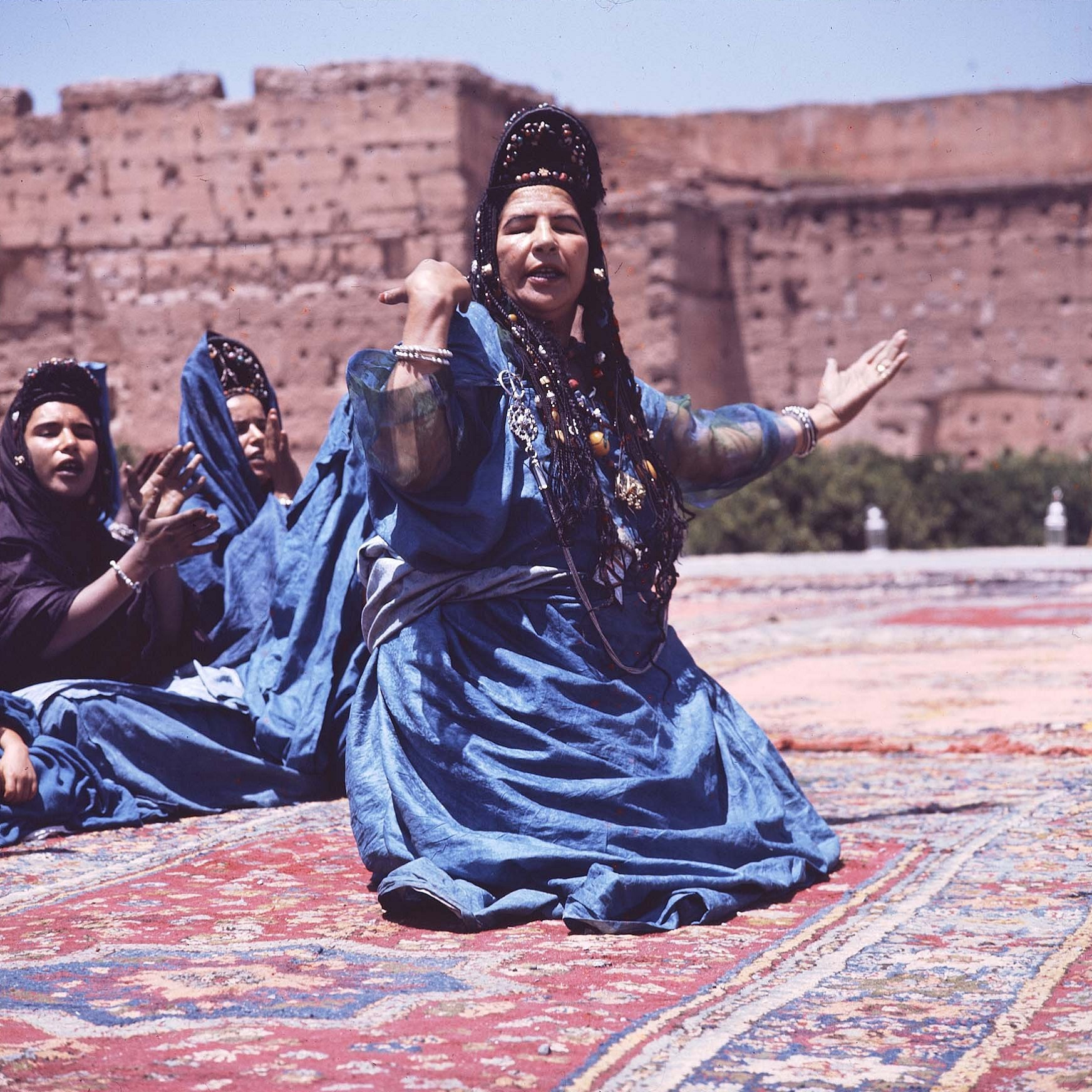
Louis Vivien de Saint-Martin suggested that the ancient Leucaethiopes were Berbers who had penetrated southward into the desert.

Speaking of the difference between modern thought and ancient times, Richard Smith warns that even apparently well-defined categories "like 'race' can be confusing". According to him, Ptolemy placed two peoples, the Leukaethiopes and Melanogaetulians ('Black Gaetulians'), in the far west of North Africa; namely, in southern Morocco. Smith suggests that the Leukaethiopes, "literally, 'white Ethiopians'", could also be described as "white black men" since in ancient times "the term 'Ethiopian' referred to skin color". He further asserts that Pliny the Elder places the Leukaethiopes south of the (Sahara) desert, between the white Gaetulians and the black Nigritae; the closest neighbours would then have been the Libyaegyptians, "literally the 'Egyptian Libyans', another oxymoron". However, Smith indicates that Pliny does not mention any black Gaetulians.

Louis Vivien de Saint-Martin posits that the Leucaethiopes were early Berbers, who had penetrated southward into the desert.

Edmund Dene Morel, writing in 1902, confirms that both Ptolemy and Pliny speak of the Leucaethiopes, but believes that Ptolemy places them "in the neighbourhood of the Gambia", whereas Pliny places them "a couple of degrees farther north". Morel then speculates on who those "light-complexioned 'Africans'" could have been. He believes they could not have been Arabs or Bantus, but argues that the Berbers were well-known to Pliny's source people, the Carthaginians, so they would have recognized Berbers if they had met them. Morel concludes that the Leucaethiopes may have been early Fulani since the first record on West Africa (ca. 300 AD) describes an Empire governed by "white" rulers, which was established by a king whose name contains a Fulfulde affix. According to Morel, this Fulani connection was first made in 1799 by Major Rennel in his Travels in the Interior of Africa, a notebook on Mungo Park's travels.

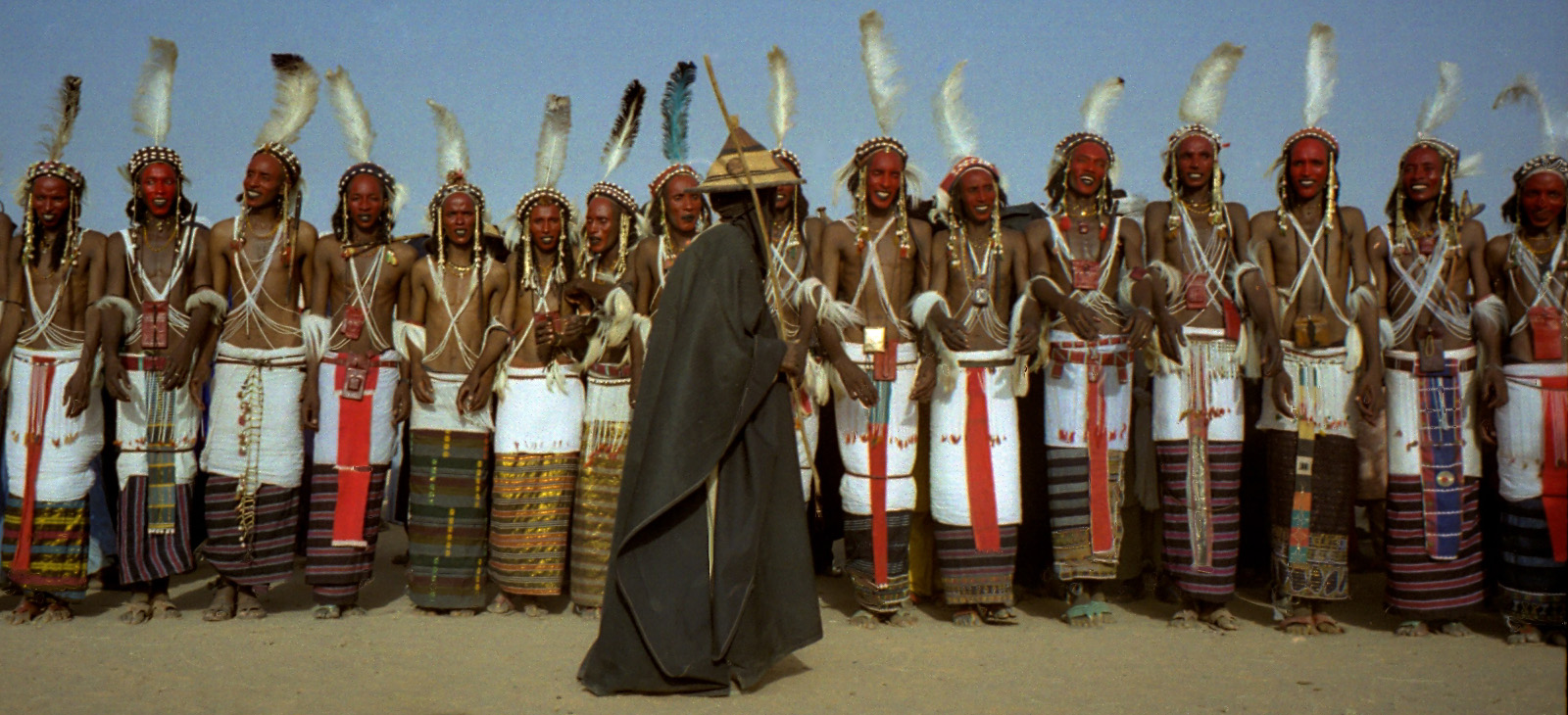
Edmund Dene Morel suggested that the early Fulani could have been Pliny's Leucaethiopes.

Richard Smith, writing in 2003, reports that "historians often assume" that both Leukaethiopes and Melanogaetulians "were of mixed race", or perhaps of some combination of race and culture. On this supposition, he suggests that the Leukaethiopes "were whites who lived in an Ethiopian-style culture", where the "Ethiopians" in question would have been the ancestors of the modern Haratin. Smith concludes that the only safe conclusion is that "the ethnic map was very complex and thus very confusing", even to Ptolemy. According to Smith, the next assumption, is that there was "some kind of awful ancient race war" in which white tribes like the Leukaethiopes were "expelled or exterminated" by the black tribes, but he argues that there is no evidence for this.

Haegap Jeoung, writing in 2003 of the attitude of Homer and the ancient Greeks, suggests that "the Ethiopians take their place as the other of the [ancient] Greeks, regardless of their skin color. Remarkably, there are white Ethiopians. Not because the Ethiopians are black, but because they are the other, they become a matter of a discourse."

== See also ==
- Aethiopian Sea
- Andromeda (mythology)
- Curse of Ham
- Sigelwara Land
- Skin whitening
- Washing the Ethiopian White

== Sources ==
- Africanus, Leo (1526). The History and Description of Africa. Hakluyt Society.
- Bates, Oric (1914). The Eastern Libyans. London: Macmillan.
- Pliny the Elder (1855). Bostock, John (ed.). The Natural History. Vol. 1. London: Taylor and Francis.
- Jeoung, Haegap (2003). An Africanist-Orientalist Discourse: The Other in Shakespeare and Hellenistic Tragedy (PhD). Louisiana State University., etd-0828103-180739.
- Morel, Edmund Dene (1968) [1902]. Affairs of West Africa. Library of African Study. Routledge. ISBN 978-0-7146-1702-2.
- Romer, Frank E. (1998). Pomponius Mela's Description of the World. Ann Arbor: University of Michigan Press. ISBN 0-472-10773-9.
- Smith, Richard (December 2003). "What happened to the ancient Libyans? Chasing Sources across the Sahara from Herodotus to Ibn Khaldun". Journal of World History. 14 (4): 459–500. doi:10.1353/jwh.2003.0060. S2CID 143724552.
- Vivien de Saint-Martin, Louis (1863). Le Nord de l'Afrique dans l'antiquité grecque et romaine: étude historique [North Africa in Greek and Roman antiquity: historical study] (in French). Imprimerie Impériale.
