= Isis (comics) =

Isis, in comics, may refer to:

- Isis (DC Comics), a comic book character originally featured in the TV show The Secret of Isis
- Isis (cat), a cat owned by supervillainess Catwoman that featured in Batman: The Animated Series and Krypto the Superdog (TV series)
- Isis (Bluewater Comics), superhero created by Angel Gate Press and Image Comics
- Isis (Marvel Comics), an Egyptian goddess in the Marvel Universe

== See also ==
- Isis (disambiguation)
