= Sigelwara Land =

Essay by J. R. R. Tolkien

Imagemap with clickable links. Tolkien's Sigelwara etymologies, leading to major strands of his Legendarium, the Silmarils, Balrogs, and Haradrim

"Sigelwara Land" is an essay by J. R. R. Tolkien that appeared in two parts, in 1932 and 1934. It explores the etymology of the Old English word for the ancient Aethiopians, Sigelhearwan, and attempts to recover what it might originally have meant. Tolkien suggested that its two elements were most likely sun/jewel and coal/hearth, perhaps meaning something like a soot-black fire-demon.

The Tolkien scholar and philologist Tom Shippey suggests that Tolkien's detailed study of the word may have influenced him in his creation of elements of his fantasy world of Middle-earth, including the Silmarils or forged sun-jewels, the Balrogs or dark fire-demons, and the Haradrim, men of the hot south.

== Essay ==
Tolkien's essay treats the etymology of the Old English word for the ancient Aethiopians, Sigelhearwan. Tolkien concluded that, while the meaning of the first element was evidently sigel "Sun", the meaning of the second element hearwan was not definitely recoverable, but might be guessed at:

a symbol ... of that large part of ancient English language and lore which has now vanished beyond recall, swa hit no wære. (Note: "As if it had never been", a quotation from the Old English poem The Wanderer)

The phrase Sigelwara land appears in Exodus, a free translation of the Book of Exodus (Codex Junius 11):

.. be suðan Sigelwara land, forbærned burhhleoðu, brune leode, hatum heofoncolum.

[... southward lay the Ethiop's land, parched hill-slopes and a race burned brown by the heat of the sun ...]

— Codex Junius 11, "Exodus" ll. 68-88

The main thrust of Tolkien's argument in this two-part paper seems to have been that Sigelwara was a corruption of Sigelhearwa, and had come to mean something different in its later form than it had in its original. He begins by pointing out that Ethiopians in the earliest writings are presented in a very positive light, but by the time they are written of as "Sigelwarans", the perception has become the opposite. He does not speculate why, but instead demonstrates a clear relationship between sigelwara and sigelhearwa and shows how discovering the original meaning of the word Sigelhearwa is almost impossible, that trying to do so must be "for the joy of the hunt rather than the hope of a final kill".

The word sigel is a conflation of two words, the inherited word for Sun, the feminine sigel, and an Old English neuter sigle or sygle for "jewel, necklace", loaned from Latin sigilla.

Suggesting a connection of hearwa with Gothic 𐌷𐌰𐌿𐍂𐌹 hauri "coal", Old Norse hyr-r "fire", and Old English heorþ "to roast" and heorð "hearth", Tolkien tentatively concludes that in the Sigelhearwan we may be looking at "rather the sons of Muspell than of Ham", an ancient class of demons "with red-hot eyes that emitted sparks and faces black as soot", English equivalent of the Norse fire giants ruled by Surtr, that had been forgotten even before the composition of this version of Exodus.

== Influence on Tolkien's fiction ==
Tom Shippey notes that the demons "with red-hot eyes" make appearances in Tolkien's fiction as Balrogs.

One of the many peoples encountered in The Lord of the Rings are "black men like half-trolls". This description recalls the Sigelwara as black demons; furthermore, their homeland of Far Harad, the great southern region of Middle-earth, recalls Sub-Saharan Africa, sometimes referred to as Aethiopia in pre-modern times. In drafts of The Lord of the Rings Tolkien toyed with names such as Harwan and Sunharrowland for the Haradrim generally and their land; Christopher Tolkien notes these names are derived from the Old English Sigelwara, and refers to Tolkien's essay Sigelwara Land.

== See also ==
- White Aethiopians
- Sowilō
