= Isis River =

Isis River may refer to:

== Rivers ==
- Isis River (New South Wales), a tributary of Pages River, Australia
- Isis River (Queensland), a tributary of Gregory River, Australia
- Isis River (Tasmania), a tributary of Macquarie River, Tasmania, Australia
- The Isis, the Thames in Oxford, England

== Settlements ==
- Isis River, Queensland, a locality in the Bundaberg Region

== See also ==
- Isis (disambiguation)
