= IIS =

IIS may refer to:

== Organizations ==
- Indian Information Service, of the Government of India
- Institute of Industrial Science, Japan
- Institute of Information Scientists, a professional association now merged into the Chartered Institute of Library and Information Professionals, UK
- Institute of Ismaili Studies, in London, England
- Iraqi Intelligence Service, the main state intelligence organization in Iraq under Saddam Hussein.

== Technology ==
- Immunization information system, an information system that collects vaccination data
- Improved iterative scaling, an algorithm in statistics
- Internet Information Services, Microsoft web server software
- Issues in Information Systems, a journal published by the International Association for Computer Information Systems

== Other uses ==
- IIS, IATA airport code for Nissan Island Airport, Papua New Guinea
- IIS, a ship prefix for ships of the Imperial Iranian Navy
- ~~IIS~~, shorthand for sestertius, an ancient Roman coin
- Insulin/IGF-1 signalling pathway, signaling intracellular mechanism involved in longevity of organisms

== See also ==
- ISS (disambiguation)
- I²S, an electrical serial bus interface standard
