= Balrog =

Race of evil fire-demons in Middle-earth

Balrogs (Note: Pronunciation: /ˈbælrɒɡ/) are a species of powerful demonic monsters in J. R. R. Tolkien's Middle-earth. The species first appeared in Tolkien's high-fantasy novel The Lord of the Rings, in which the Company of the Ring encounter a Balrog known as Durin's Bane in the Mines of Moria. Balrogs appear also in Tolkien's The Silmarillion and his legendarium. Balrogs are tall and menacing beings who can shroud themselves in fire, darkness, and shadow. They are armed with fiery whips "of many thongs", (Note: Tolkien 1977 and its early drafts speak frequently of the whips of fire. The Lays of Beleriand describe Morgoth's prisoners tortured by Balrogs with scourges; and the Balrog in Moria (The Fellowship of the Ring, "The Bridge of Khazad-dûm") is armed explicitly with a "whip of many thongs" or strands.) and occasionally use long swords.

In Tolkien's later conception, Balrogs could not be readily vanquished—a certain stature was required by the would-be hero. Only dragons rivalled their capacity for ferocity and destruction; (Note: Tolkien 1984b, "Turambar and the Foalókë", p.85: "yet of all are they [dragons] the most powerful, save it be the Balrogs only.") during the First Age of Middle-earth, they were among the most feared of Morgoth's forces. Their power came from their nature as Maiar, angelic beings like the Valar, though of lesser power. Tolkien invented the name "Balrog", providing an in-universe etymology for it as a word in his invented Sindarin language. He may have gained the idea of a fire demon from his philological study of the Old English word Sigelwara, which he studied in detail in the 1930s. Balrogs appear in the film adaptations of The Lord of the Rings by Ralph Bakshi and Peter Jackson, in the streaming series The Rings of Power, and in computer and video games based on Middle-earth.

== Context ==
According to the mythology in The Silmarillion, the evil Vala Melkor, later called "Morgoth", corrupted lesser Maiar (angelic beings) to his service, as Balrogs, in the days of his splendour before the making of Arda. (Note: Tolkien 1977, "Valaquenta") (Note: Tolkien 1977, ch. 3 "Of the Coming of the Elves and the Captivity of Melkor") After the awakening of the Elves, the Valar captured Melkor and destroyed his fortresses Utumno and Angband. But they overlooked the deepest pits, where, with many of Melkor's other allies, the Balrogs fled into hiding. When Melkor returned to Middle-earth from Valinor, he was attacked by the evil giant spider Ungoliant; his scream drew the Balrogs out of hiding to his rescue.

== Characteristics ==
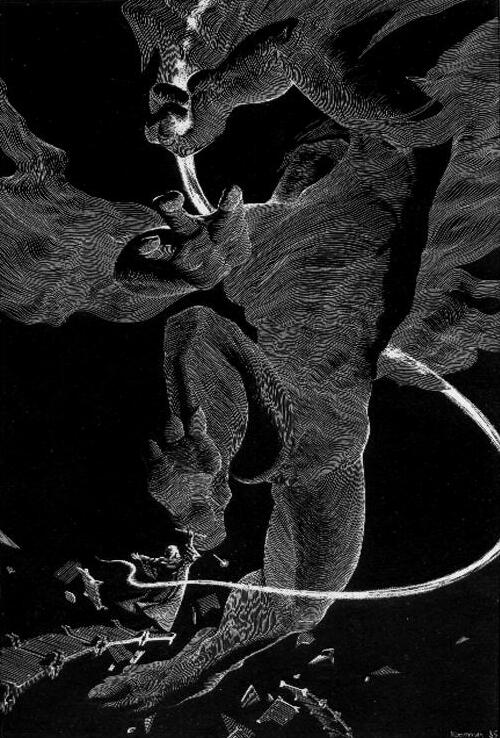
Alexander Korotich's 1981 scratchboard illustration of Gandalf fighting the Balrog on the bridge of Khazad-dûm

Tolkien's conception of Balrogs changed over time. In all his early writing, they are numerous. A host of a thousand is mentioned in the Quenta Silmarillion, (Note: Tolkien 1987, p. 312, "there came Balrogs one thousand".) while at the storming of Gondolin Balrogs in the hundreds ride on the backs of the Dragons. (Note: Tolkien 1984b, p. 170.) They are roughly of twice (Note: Tolkien 1984b, p. 194: "... it pierced the Balrog's belly nigh his own face (for that demon was double his stature) ...". For comparison, other Maiar are of human size: Olórin (Gandalf), Melian. In Tolkien 1993, p.69, a note by Tolkien states: "The Valar.... most often used shapes of 'human' form, though taller (not gigantic) and more magnificent.") human size, (Note: Tolkien 1989, p. 197.) and were rarely killed in battle. (Note: Tolkien 1984b, p.179 "the number of Balrogs that perished was a marvel and a dread to the hosts of Melkor, for ere that day never had any of the Balrogs been slain by the hand of Elves or Men.") They were fierce demons, associated with fire, armed with fiery whips of many thongs and claws like steel, and Morgoth delighted in using them to torture his captives. (Note: Tolkien 1984b, p. 169.)

In the published version of The Lord of the Rings, however, Balrogs became altogether more sinister and more powerful. Christopher Tolkien notes the difference, saying that in earlier versions they were "less terrible and certainly more destructible". He quotes a very late marginal note that was not incorporated into the text saying "at most seven" ever existed; (Note: Tolkien 1984b, "The Fall of Gondolin", pp. 212–213.) though in the Annals of Aman, written as late as 1958, Melkor still commands "a host of Balrogs". In later writings they ceased to be mortal, but are instead Maiar, lesser Ainur like Gandalf or Sauron, spirits of fire whom Melkor had corrupted before the creation of the World. Power of the order of Gandalf's was necessary to destroy them, as when Gandalf at the Bridge of Khazad-dûm tells the others "This is a foe beyond any of you." (Note: Tolkien 1954a, book 2, ch. 5 "The Bridge of Khazad-dûm")

As Maiar, only the physical form of a Balrog could be destroyed. Tolkien says of the Valar and the Maiar that they can change their shape at will, and move unclad in the raiment of the world, meaning invisible and without form. (Note: Tolkien 1977, "Ainulindalë", p. 21.) However, it seems that Morgoth, Sauron, and their associated Maiar could lose this ability: Morgoth, for example, was unable to heal his burns from the Silmarils or wounds from Fingolfin and the eagle Thorondor; (Note: Tolkien 1977 ch. 18 "Of the Ruin of Beleriand and the Fall of Fingolfin") and Sauron lost his ability to assume a fair-seeming form after his physical body was destroyed in the downfall of Númenor. (Note: Tolkien 1955, Appendix A, Part I, Section (i).)

Tolkien does not address this specifically for Balrogs, though in his later conception, as at the Bridge of Khazad-dûm, the Balrog appears "like a great shadow, in the middle of which was a dark form, of man-shape maybe, yet greater". Though previously the Balrog had entered the "large square chamber" of Mazarbul, at the Bridge of Khazad-dûm it "drew itself to a great height, and its wings spread from wall to wall" in the vast hall. The Balrog's size and shape, therefore, are not given precisely. When Gandalf threw it from the peak of Zirakzigil, the Balrog "broke the mountain-side where he smote it in his ruin". (Note: Tolkien 1954, book 3, ch. 5 "The White Rider") Whether Balrogs had wings (and if so, whether they could fly) is unclear. This is due both to Tolkien's changing conception of Balrogs, and to the imprecise but suggestive and possibly figurative description of the Balrog that confronted Gandalf.

The Balrog of Moria used a flaming sword ("From out of the shadow a red sword leapt flaming") and a many-thonged whip that "whined and cracked" in its battle with Gandalf. In The Silmarillion, they also used black axes and maces. (Note: Tolkien 1977, "Of the Fifth Battle", pp. 193-4.) Earlier writings also speak of steel claws and iron mail. (Note: Tolkien 1984b, pp. 169, 181, 194.)

In earlier drafts of The Lord of the Rings, some further indications of Tolkien's evolving conceptions appear, as when

A figure strode to the fissure, no more than man-high yet terror seemed to go before it. They could see the furnace-fire of its eyes from afar; its arms were very long; it had a red [?tongue]. (Note: Tolkien 1989, "The Bridge", pp. 197-198)

At this writing Tolkien contemplated an edict of the Valar concerning Balrogs, having Gandalf challenge the Balrog by saying "It is forbidden for any Balrog to come beneath the sky since Fionwë (Note: Eönwë in later versions) son of Manwë overthrew Thangorodrim."

== Individual Balrogs ==
=== Gothmog ===
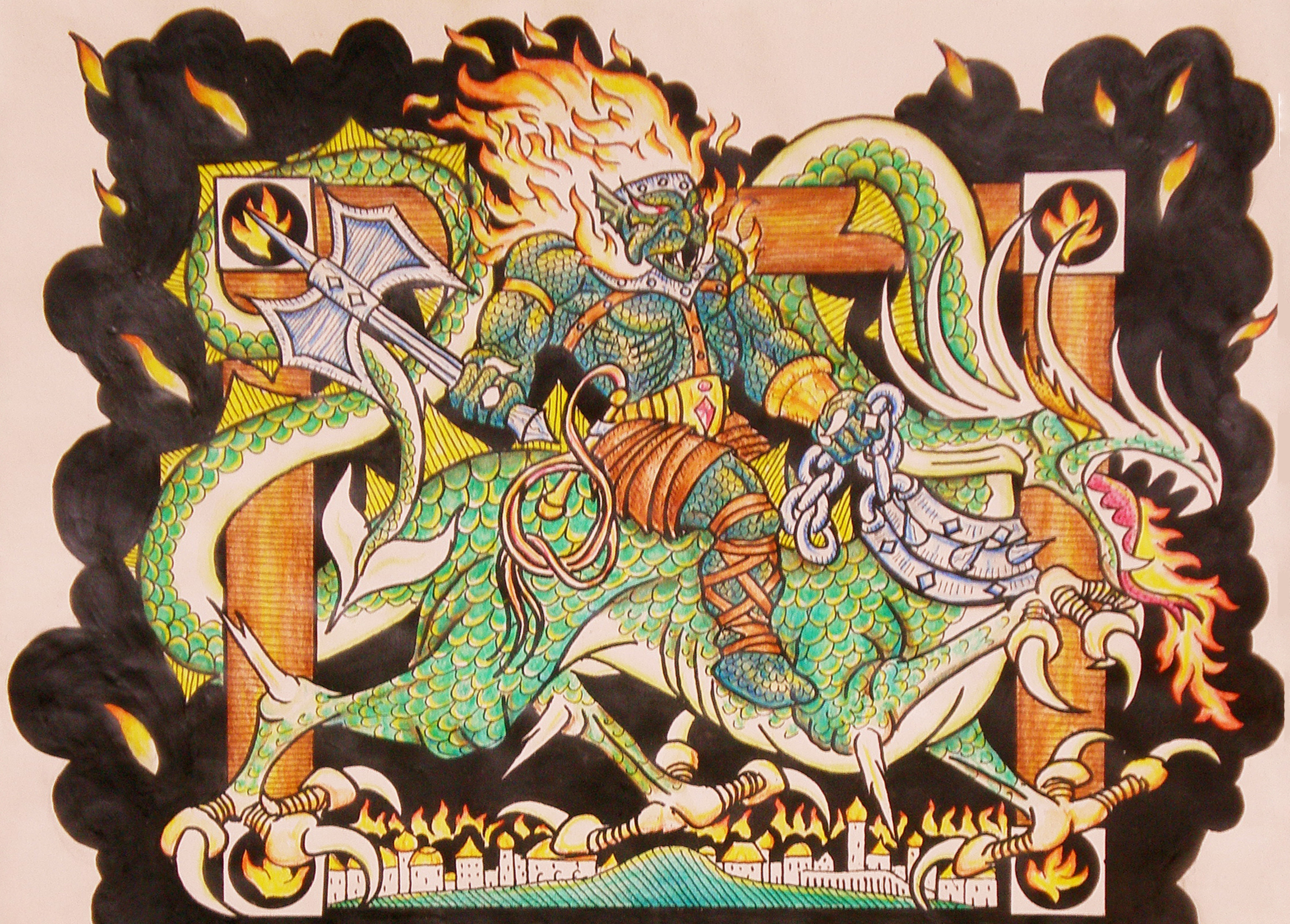
Tom Loback's Gothmog at the Storming of Gondolin.

Gothmog is developed in successive versions of Silmarillion material. He is physically massive and strong, and in one version he is some 12 feet tall. (Note: Tolkien 1984b, p. 194: "... it pierced the Balrog's belly nigh his own face (for that demon was double his stature) ...") He wields a black axe and whip of flame as his weapons. He holds the titles of the Lord of the Balrogs, the High Captain of Angband, and Marshal of the Hosts. In the Second Battle, Dagor-nuin-Giliath, he leads a force that ambushes Fëanor and wounds him mortally. (Note: Tolkien 1977, ch. 13 "Of the Return of the Noldor") He leads Balrogs, Orc-hosts, and Dragons as Morgoth's commander in the field in the Fifth Battle, Nírnaeth Arnoediad, and slays Fingon, High King of the Noldor. In that same battle, he captures Húrin of Dor-lómin, who had slain his personal guard of Battle-trolls, and brings him to Angband. (Note: Tolkien 1977, ch. 20, "Of the Fifth Battle: Nirnaeth Arnoediad") As Marshal of the Hosts, he is in command of the Storming of Gondolin. He is about to kill Tuor when Ecthelion of the Fountain, a Noldorin Elf-lord, intervenes. Gothmog fights Ecthelion in single combat, and they kill each other. (Note: Tolkien 1977, ch. 23, "Of Tuor and the Fall of Gondolin")

In The Book of Lost Tales, Tolkien describes Kosomot, the original version of Gothmog, as a son of Morgoth and the ogress Fluithuin or Ulbandi. (Note: Tolkien 1984, Part I, p. 93.) Gothmog is Sindarin for "Dread Oppressor". (Note: Tolkien 1987, "The Etymologies", p. 359, 372.) Kosomot is often considered Gothmog's Quenya name; (Note: Tolkien 1984b, p. 216.) however, in the Quenya name-list of The Fall of Gondolin another version appears, Kosomoko. (Note: Parma Eldalamberon, No. 15, p.26, the 'Name List to The Fall of Gondolin'.)

In Tolkien's early Lay of the Children of Húrin is "Lungorthin, Lord of Balrogs". This might be another name for Gothmog, though Christopher Tolkien thought it more likely that Lungorthin was simply "a Balrog lord". (Note: Tolkien 1985, p. 102.)

=== Durin's Bane ===
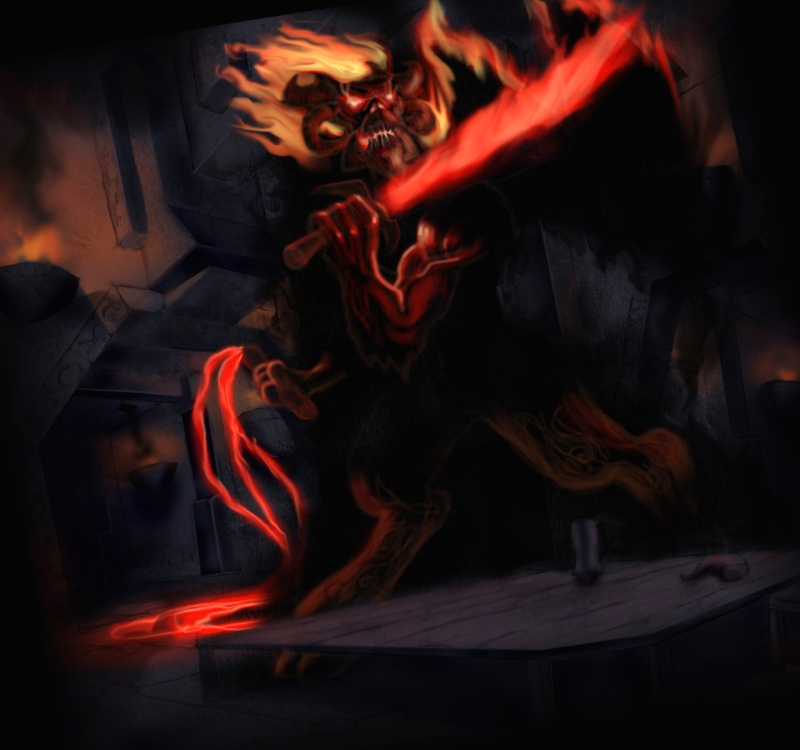
Artwork by Markus Röncke of Durin's Bane, the Balrog in Moria

This Balrog appears in The Lord of the Rings, encountered by the Company of the Ring in the Mines of Moria. It survived the defeat of Morgoth in the War of Wrath, escaping to hide beneath the Misty Mountains. (Note: Tolkien 1955, Appendix A (III).) For more than five millennia, the Balrog remained in its deep hiding place at the roots of Caradhras, (Note: Tolkien 1954a, book 2, ch. 4 "A Journey in the Dark") one of the Mountains of Moria, until in the Third Age, the mithril-miners of the Dwarf-kingdom of Khazad-dûm disturbed it. The Balrog killed Durin VI, the Dwarf-King of Khazad-dûm, whereafter it was called Durin's Bane by the Dwarves. (Note: Tolkien 1955, Appendix B, "The Tale of Years", "The Third Age" entry for 1980.) Avarice, principally for mithril, drove the dwarves to go too deep and awaken the Balrog.

The Dwarves attempted to fight the Balrog, but its power was far too great for them. In their efforts to hold Khazad-dûm against it, many Dwarves were killed: Durin's successor Náin ruled for only a year. The survivors were forced to flee. This disaster reached the Silvan Elves of Lothlórien, many of whom fled the "Nameless Terror". From this time Khazad-dûm was known as Moria, Sindarin for "Black Pit" or "Black Chasm". (Note: Tolkien 1954a, book 2, ch. 3 "The Ring Goes South") (Note: Tolkien 1955, Appendix F, Part II)

For another 500 years, Moria was left to the Balrog; though according to Unfinished Tales, Orcs crept in soon after the Dwarves were driven out, leading to Nimrodel's flight. (Note: Tolkien 1980, "The Tale of Galadriel and Celeborn", p. 241.) Sauron began to put his plans for war into effect, and he sent Orcs and Trolls to the Misty Mountains to bar the passes.

During the reign of Thráin II, the Dwarves attempted to retake Moria in the War of the Dwarves and Orcs, culminating in the Battle of Azanulbizar before the eastern gate of Moria. This was a victory for the Dwarves, but the Balrog prevented them from reoccupying Moria. Dáin II Ironfoot, having slain the Orc Azog near the gate, perceived the terror of the Balrog within and warned Thráin that Moria was unachievable until some greater force could remove the Balrog. The Dwarves departed and resumed their exile. Despite Dáin's warning, Balin made another attempt to retake Moria. His party managed to start a colony, but was massacred a few years later.

The Fellowship of the Ring travelled through Moria on the quest to destroy the One Ring in Mount Doom. They were attacked in the Chamber of Mazarbul by Orcs. The Fellowship fled through a side door, but when the wizard Gandalf the Grey tried to place a "shutting spell" on the door to block the pursuit behind them, the Balrog entered the chamber on the other side and cast a "terrible" counterspell. Gandalf spoke a word of Command to stay the door, but the door shattered and the chamber collapsed. Gandalf was weakened by this encounter. The company fled with him, but the Orcs and the Balrog, taking a different route, caught up with them at the Bridge of Khazad-dûm. The Elf Legolas instantly recognized the Balrog and Gandalf tried to hold the bridge against it. As Gandalf faced the Balrog, he proclaimed, "You cannot pass, flame of Udûn!", and broke the bridge beneath the Balrog. As it fell, the Balrog wrapped its whip about Gandalf's knees, dragging him to the brink. As the Fellowship looked on in horror, Gandalf cried "Fly, you fools!" and plunged into the darkness below.

After a long fall, the two crashed into a deep subterranean lake, which extinguished the flames of the Balrog's body; however it remained "a thing of slime, stronger than a strangling snake". They fought in the water; the Balrog clutched at Gandalf to strangle him, and Gandalf hewed the Balrog with his sword, until finally the Balrog fled into the primordial tunnels of Moria's underworld. Gandalf pursued the monster for eight days, until they climbed to the peak of Zirakzigil, where the Balrog was forced to turn and fight, its body erupting into new flame. Here they fought for two days and nights. In the end, the Balrog was defeated and cast down, breaking the mountainside where it fell "in ruin".

Gandalf himself died shortly afterwards, but he returned to Middle-earth with greater powers, as Gandalf the White, "until his task was finished". Critics such as Jerram Barrs have recognised this as a transfiguration similar to that of Jesus Christ, suggesting Gandalf's prophet-like status. The critic Clive Tolley notes that the contest between Gandalf and the Balrog on Durin's bridge somewhat recalls a shamanistic contest, but that a far closer parallel is medieval vision literature, giving the example of St Patrick's Purgatory, and even Dante's Divine Comedy.

== In-universe origins ==
The name "Balrog", but not the meaning, emerges early in Tolkien's work: it appears in The Fall of Gondolin, one of the earliest texts Tolkien wrote, around 1918. Tolkien began a poem in alliterative verse about the battle of Glorfindel with the Balrog in that text, where both were killed by falling into the abyss, just like Gandalf and the Balrog in The Lord of the Rings.

An early list of names described Balrog as "an Orc-word with no pure equivalent in Tolkien's invented language of Quenya: 'borrowed Malaroko-' ". (Note: Tolkien 1987, p. 404.) In Gnomish (another of Tolkien's invented languages), Balrog is parsed as balc 'cruel' + graug 'demon', with a Quenya equivalent Malkarauke. Variant forms of the latter include Nalkarauke and Valkarauke. (Note: Tolkien 1984, Part I, Appendix: Names in The Book of Lost Tales, p. 250.) By the 1940s, when Tolkien began writing The Lord of the Rings, he had come to think of Balrog as Noldorin balch 'cruel' + rhaug 'demon', with a Quenya equivalent Malarauko (from nwalya- 'to torture' + rauko 'demon'). (Note: Tolkien 1987, "The Etymologies", entries for ÑGWAL (p. 377) and RUK (p. 384).) The last etymology, appearing in the invented languages Quendi and Eldar, derives Balrog as the Sindarin translation of the Quenya form Valarauko (Demon of Might). This etymology was published in The Silmarillion. (Note: Tolkien 1977, Index, p. 353.) (Note: Tolkien 1993, "Annals of Aman", Section 2.) Gandalf on the bridge of Khazad-dûm calls the Balrog "flame of Udûn" (the Sindarin name of Morgoth's fortress Utumno).

== Real-world origins ==
=== Sigelwara ===
Imagemap with clickable links. Tolkien's Sigelwara etymologies, leading to major strands of his Legendarium including Balrogs and also the Silmarils and Haradrim. (Note: Tolkien, J. R. R., "Sigelwara Land" Medium Aevum Vol. 1, No. 3. December 1932 and Medium Aevum Vol. 3, No. 2. June 1934.)

Tolkien was a professional philologist, a scholar of comparative and historical linguistics. (Note: Carpenter 2023, #165 to Houghton Mifflin, 30 June 1955) The Balrog and other concepts in his writings derived from the Old English word Sigelwara, used in texts such as the Codex Junius to mean "Aethiopian". He wondered why the Anglo-Saxons would have had a word with this meaning, conjecturing that it had formerly had a different meaning. He emended the word to Sigelhearwan, and in his essay "Sigelwara Land", explored in detail the two parts of the word. He stated that Sigel meant "both sun and jewel", the former as it was the name of the Sun rune *sowilō (ᛋ), the latter connotation from Latin sigillum, a seal. He decided that Hearwa was related to Old English heorð, "hearth", and ultimately to Latin carbo, "soot". He suggested from all this that Sigelhearwan implied "rather the sons of Muspell than of Ham", (Note: Tolkien meant that the Sigelhearwan were not just dark-skinned but also fiery.) a class of demons in Northern mythology "with red-hot eyes that emitted sparks and faces black as soot". The Tolkien scholar Tom Shippey states that this both "helped to naturalise the Balrog" and contributed to the Silmarils, which combined the nature of the sun and jewels. The Aethiopians suggested to Tolkien the Haradrim, a dark southern race of men. (Note: Tolkien 1989, ch. 25, pp. 435, 439 note 4 (comments by Christopher Tolkien))

=== Old Norse, Old English ===
A real-world etymological counterpart for the word "Balrog" existed long before Tolkien's languages, in Norse mythology; an epithet of the Norse god Odin was Báleygr, "fire-eyed".

Joe Abbott, writing in Mythlore, notes that the Old Norse Voluspa mentions that the fire-demon Surt carries both a sword and a sviga laevi, a deadly whipping-stick or switch; he suggests that it is "a short step" from that to the Balrog's flaming whip. Abbott makes a connection, too, with the Beowulf poet's account of the monster Grendel: he notes that Tolkien wrote that Grendel was "physical enough in form and power, but vaguely felt as belonging to a different order of being, one allied to the malevolent 'ghosts' of the dead", and compares this with Aragorn's description of the Balrog as "both a shadow and a flame, strong and terrible".

=== Moria and the Battle of Maldon ===
Tolkien felt acutely the error made by the English commander, the ealdorman Byrhtnoth, at the Battle of Maldon, allowing the Vikings to step ashore and win the battle. Alexander Bruce, in Mythlore, comments that Tolkien may have used Gandalf's battle with the Balrog on the narrow bridge in Moria to "correct the behavior of the self-serving Byrhtnoth through the actions of the self-less Gandalf". Bruce notes that the Tolkien scholar Janet Brennan Croft also contrasts the two leaders.

Alexander Bruce's comparison of Gandalf's stand in Moria with Byrhtnoth's action in the Battle of Maldon
| Leader | Encounter | Action | Result |
|---|---|---|---|
| Byrhtnoth | Battle of Maldon | Allows Viking enemy across causeway | Army defeated, Byrhtnoth killed, English pay Danegeld tribute |
| Gandalf | Bridge of Khazad-dûm | Holds the bridge against the Balrog | Both Gandalf and the Balrog fall into the abyss. The Fellowship escape. |

=== The fall of Gondolin and the fall of Troy ===
There are multiple parallels between the Fall of Gondolin and the fall of Troy, as told in the Iliad, but again the tales differ. The Elf Ecthelion leads the charge against the Orcs, and fights Gothmog, the greatest Balrog; they wound each other and both fall into the king's fountain in Gondolin; both drown. Bruce compares this to how Aeneas rallies the Trojans, but fails, and sees king Priam perish.

== Adaptations ==
The depiction of the Balrog in Peter Jackson's film The Lord of the Rings: The Fellowship of the Ring set the standard for later representations.

The Balrog in Ralph Bakshi's 1978 animated version was named Durin's Bane and had large wings like those of a bat. Peter Jackson's 2001 and 2002 films The Fellowship of the Ring and The Two Towers had similar wings, expressing its "satanic, demonic nature". Earlier artists such as Ted Nasmith had depicted Balrogs without wings; Jackson's films used the design of Tolkien illustrator John Howe, making wings standard, in the same way that Jackson has made pointed ears standard for elves. A Balrog appears in The Lord of the Rings: The Rings of Power, with a similar visual design to Jackson's monster. It will speak in the upcoming third season (the first time a Balrog has spoken in any medium) and will be voiced by Simon Pegg.

Balrogs appear in Middle-earth computer and video games and merchandise. In the real-time strategy game The Lord of the Rings: The Battle for Middle-earth, and its sequel, both based on Jackson's movies, the Balrog can use its wings, although only in short leaps. In the role-playing game The Lord of the Rings: The Third Age, also based on the Jackson movies, the Balrog uses its wings to fly into the air, and comes crashing down, sending a damaging shockwave of flames at the player. In another game based on Jackson's movies, The Lord of the Rings: Conquest, the Balrog is a playable hero.

A Balrog features in King Gizzard & the Lizard Wizard's 2017 album Murder of the Universe (2017) as a giant reanimated monster. Songwriter Stu Mackenzie explained: "It might not be the Balrog from Middle Earth, but he is a sort of fire demon."

Early Dungeons & Dragons books featured Balrogs among other Middle-earth characters like Hobbits and Ents; after a lawsuit brought by the Tolkien Estate, these Tolkien-specific names were changed, the Balrogs becoming Balor, after the one-eyed monster of Irish mythology.

== In culture ==
A now-defunct fantasy writing prize, the Balrog Award, was named after the monsters. The Japanese anime series Restaurant to Another World introduces a Balrog as a butler; this Balrog is described as polite.
