= Asset (disambiguation) =

An asset is an economic resource, or something of value.

Asset, ASSET or The Asset may also refer to:

== Computing ==
- Asset (computer security), an asset in computer security context
- Digital assets, the graphics, audio, and other artistic data that go into media, particularly interactive media such as video games

== Economics ==
- Asset (economics), a durable good which is not fully depreciated to zero value after the current period of analysis

== Entertainment ==
- "The Asset" (Agents of S.H.I.E.L.D.), third episode of U.S. television series Agents of S.H.I.E.L.D.
- The Asset (film), 1918 American film
- The Assets, an eight-part American drama television miniseries
- The Asset, a play by Robert Kemp
- The Asset (TV series), Danish-language espionage crime drama

== Intelligence ==
- Asset (intelligence), an outside person who provides intelligence

== Military ==
- Military asset, a weapon or means of production of weapons or other defensive or offensive devices or capabilities

== Organisations ==
- Americans Standing for the Simplification of the Estate Tax, a lobbyist group
- Association of Supervisory Staffs, Executives and Technicians, a former British trade union

== Spacecraft ==
- ASSET (spacecraft), an experimental U.S. reentry vehicle

== See also ==
- ASET (disambiguation)
