= ISET =

Iset or ISET may refer to:

- Iset, an Ancient Egyptian name of the goddess better known by her Greek name Isis
- Iset (village), on the Lena River, Russia
- Iset (river), a river in Russia rising in the Ural Mountains and flowing east into the Tobol River
- International Solar Electric Technology (ISET), a former solar power company
- Inner sphere electron transfer (ISET), a redox chemical reaction
- ISET Test (Isolation by SizE of Tumor cells, ISET), a diagnostic blood test

== See also ==
- Isis, a major goddess in ancient Egyptian religion
