= Saint Charles, Ohio =

Unincorporated community in Ohio, U.S.

Saint Charles (also known as Isis) is an unincorporated community in Butler County, in the U.S. state of Ohio.

== History ==
A post office called Saint Charles was established in 1850, and remained in operation until 1905. The U.S. Geographic Names Information System (GNIS) lists the historical location of the post office at 39°23′30″N 84°44′35″W.

The community was named for Charles Stewart, an early settler.
