= Institute for Science and Society =

The Institute for Science and Society (ISS) is an international centre of research in Science and Technology Studies located at the University of Nottingham in England. In 2024, Professor Pru Hobson West is the director of the institute.

== History ==
The organisation was founded in 1998. It was known as the Genetics and Society Unit (GSU) until 2001. It was renamed the Institute for the Study of Genetics, Biorisks and Society (IGBiS). Its remit was expanded in 2006 to cover the social, legal, ethical and cultural implications of any field of science, medicine or technology, at which point it became ISS. The institute is located in the School of Sociology and Social Policy but works virtually across the university and has strong links with the sciences and engineering.

== About ISS ==
The Institute for Science and Society is a multidisciplinary centre drawing on a wide range of social sciences and humanities disciplines to conduct research into aspects of the mutual relationship between science and society.

Since ISS was founded in 1998 it has attracted over £20 million in research funding and has been variously supported by grants and contracts from the Leverhulme and Wellcome Trusts, the Economic and Social Research Council (ESRC), the Natural Environment Research Council (NERC), the Biotechnology and Biological Sciences Research Council (BBSRC), the Medical Research Council (MRC), The Engineering and Physical Sciences Research Council (EPSRC), the European Union and the National Health Service (NHS).

Over 50 research students have graduated from ISS since it was established.

In 2024, it became a founding member of the STSMN network (Science and Technology Studies in the Midlands and North).
