= Silent trade =

Nonverbal communication used by traders

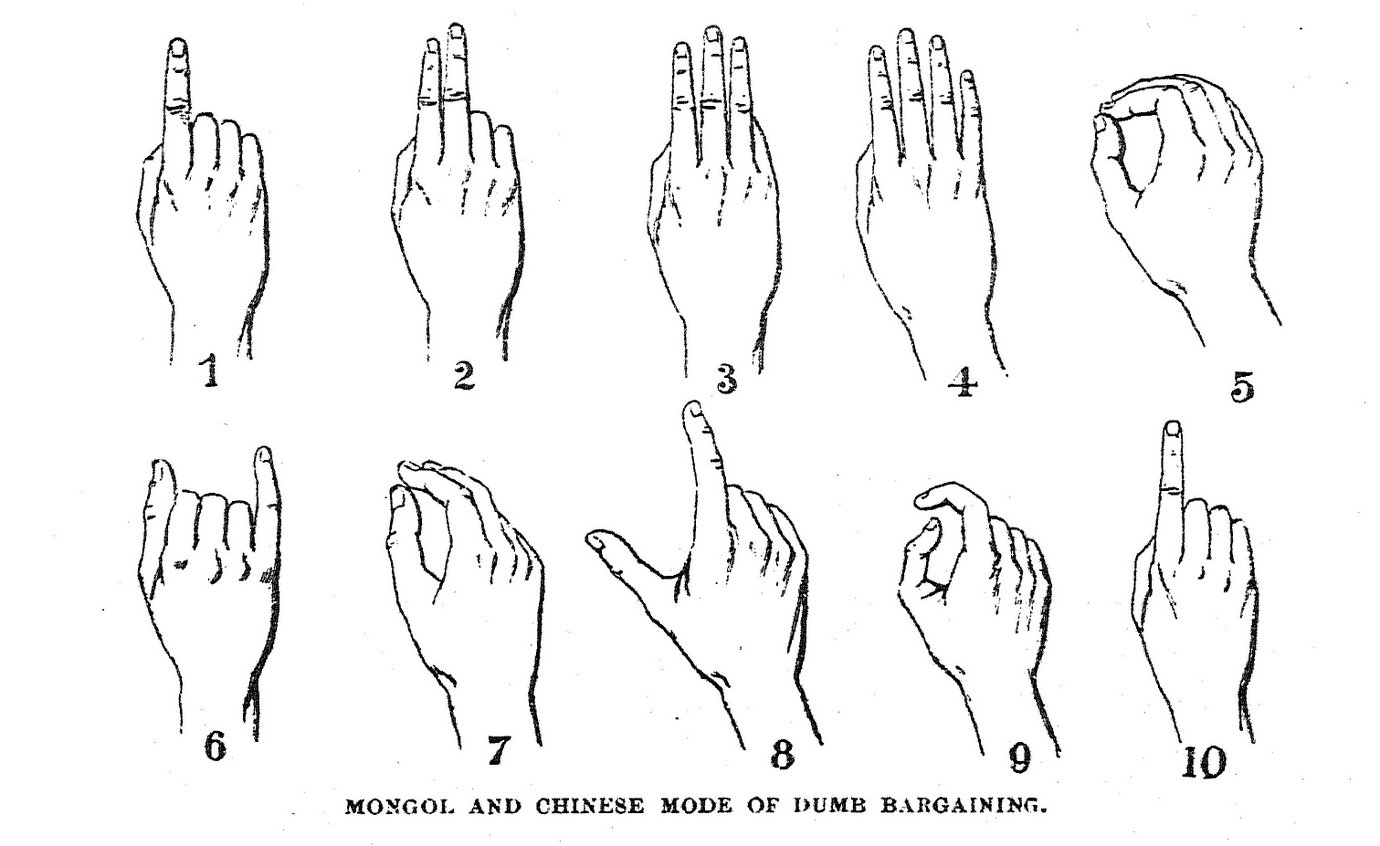
Chinese and Mongolian mode of dumb bargain

Silent trade, also called silent barter, dumb barter ("dumb" here used in its old meaning of "mute"), or depot trade, is a method by which traders who cannot speak each other's language can trade without talking. Group A would leave trade goods in a prominent position and signal, by gong, fire, or drum for example, that they had left goods. Group B would then arrive at the spot, examine the goods and deposit their trade goods or money that they wanted to exchange and withdraw. Group A would then return and either accept the trade by taking the goods from Group B or withdraw again leaving Group B to add to or change out items to create an equal value. The trade ends when Group A accepts Group B's offer and removes the offered goods leaving Group B to remove the original goods.

This system was used in many parts of ancient Africa. Silent trading was mainly used during the period 500 to 1500. The practice was also well established between tribes in Africa in their trade with India. Cosmas Indicopleustes describes this practiced in Azania, where officials from Axum traded for gold with beef. Prince Henry the Navigator of Portugal recorded this practice when he occupied Ceuta in 1415.

In West Africa gold mined south of the Sahel was traded for salt mined in the desert. The salt from the desert was needed by the people of Sahel to flavor and preserve their food and the gold had obvious value, especially in trading with the European people. Because of this trade, cities grew and flourished and parts of West Africa became commercial centers. West Africa produced large amounts of gold until about 1500 AD. The communication in this gold-for-salt was carried out using drums.

Silent trade might be used because of an inability to speak the other traders' language, or to protect the secrets of where the valuable gold and salt came from.

Silent bartering has been used since ancient times, such as the ancient Ghana Empire. The Ghanaian salt traders would leave pounds of salt by the Niger river and the gold traders would leave a fair amount of gold in turn.

== Procedure ==
To perform a silent trade, one group of traders would go to a specific location, leave their trading goods and then withdraw to a distance. Then play a drum to signal the other traders that a silent trade was taking place. The other group of traders would then approach and inspect the goods (most commonly salt or gold). If the goods met with approval, the second group would then take the goods, leave their own goods in return, and depart. This system of trading was used in particular in ancient Ghana. It was also used among the Kushites and the Aksumites.

The Greek historian Herodotus (4.196) wrote about the gold trade with Ghana and Carthage: "The Carthaginians also tell us that they trade with a race of men who live in a part of Libya beyond the Pillars of Hercules. On reaching this country, they unload their goods, arrange them tidily along the beach, and then, returning to their boats, raise a smoke. Seeing the smoke, the natives come down to the beach, place on the ground a certain quantity of gold in exchange for the goods, and go off again to a distance. The Carthaginians then come ashore and take a look at the gold; and if they think it represents a fair price for their wares, they collect it and go away; if, on the other hand, it seems too little, they go back aboard and wait, and the natives come and add to the gold until they are satisfied. There is perfect honesty on both sides; the Carthaginians never touch the gold until it equals in value what they have offered for sale, and the natives never touch the goods until the gold has been taken away."

== Banyan merchants ==
W.S.W. Ruschenberger, M.D., in Zanzibar in 1835, describes Banyan merchants, then cites "Establecimientos ultramarinos. Tomo III. Madrid 1786" in writing:

....A very short time sufficed them to transact the most important business. They usually dealt in bazaars; the vender told the price of his goods in a subdued voice and in few words; the purchaser replied by taking his hand, and by a certain manner of doubling and extending the fingers, explained what abatement he wished in the price. The bargain was often concluded without speaking a word; and, to ratify it, the hand was again taken in token of its inviolability....

Such were the Banyans three centuries gone by, and we have reason to think, they have not been entirely changed.
