= Unity ISIS =

Avid Unity ISIS is a storage system for video files used by television broadcasters, developed by Avid Technology. ISIS stands for "Infinitely Scalable Intelligent Storage.”

== Capabilities ==
Isis Version 2.0 has 400 megabytes per second of bandwidth for each engine, and 10 gigabit per second connectivity, allowing uncompressed files. 330 clients can use the system at once, with total storage of 384 terabytes, or 196 terabytes capable of being used with mirror mode, meaning that data is always stored twice, but in random locations rather than using specific pairs of drives. This is sufficient for 430 hours of uncompressed HD or 8300 hours of compressed 50-megabyte-per-second HD.

“Infinitely scalable,” according to David Schleifer, Avid vice president for technology and work groups, means that, in theory, storage is unlimited because individual systems can be linked to each other. Each time a new system is added, he says, the data moves from the existing system to the new system in such a way that the two systems have the same amount of information. “Intelligent Storage” refers to advancing beyond the idea that a central server must be accessed each time a file is desired. This type of system limits the number of users at a time. Senior product manager Andy Dale says 16 “blades,” or circuit boards, make it possible for many users to access the system at once. The system components—engines, switch blades, storage blades, and power/cooling units—can be changed without work stopping. Individual units can make decisions themselves, improving productivity for the entire system.

Since broadcasters need their video files at all times in a world of 24-hour news, and since there are more of them needing such access, the ability to retrieve such files instantly is no longer a luxury. Sharing of systems cuts costs and allows data to be backed up in the event a possible problem is detected.

== History ==
Avid Unity ISIS was introduced in October 2005 as a successor to Avid's Unity system, which could hold 20 terabytes for as many as 60 clients. Unity ISIS could hold 64 terabytes and could be used by as many as 100 clients at once. Schleider said content could be retrieved at 50 gigabytes per second, making HD files possible. CBS News planned to use the system as it upgraded to a digital newsroom concept. Competitors at the time with smaller systems included Quantel, Grass Valley and Omneon.

In January 2007, WBZ-TV in Boston, Massachusetts switched to a tapeless system, using a 64-terabyte ISIS system capable of storing 2200 hours of content.
