= Aethiopian Sea =

Name given to the southern part of the Atlantic Ocean in classical geographical works

Aethiopian Sea Aethiopian Ocean البحر الأثيوبي
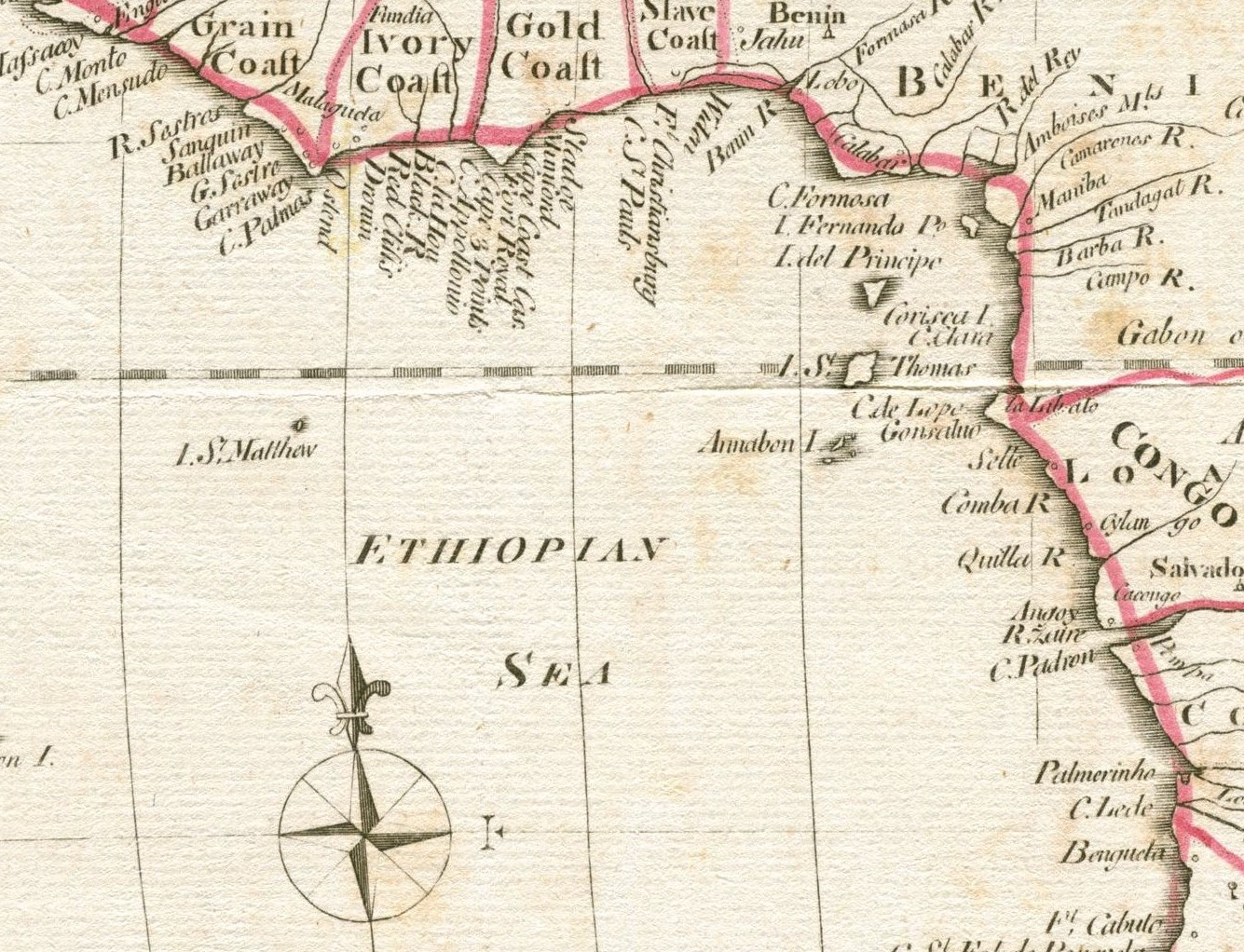
- Ethiopian Sea section of Mathew Carey's 1795 Africa map.

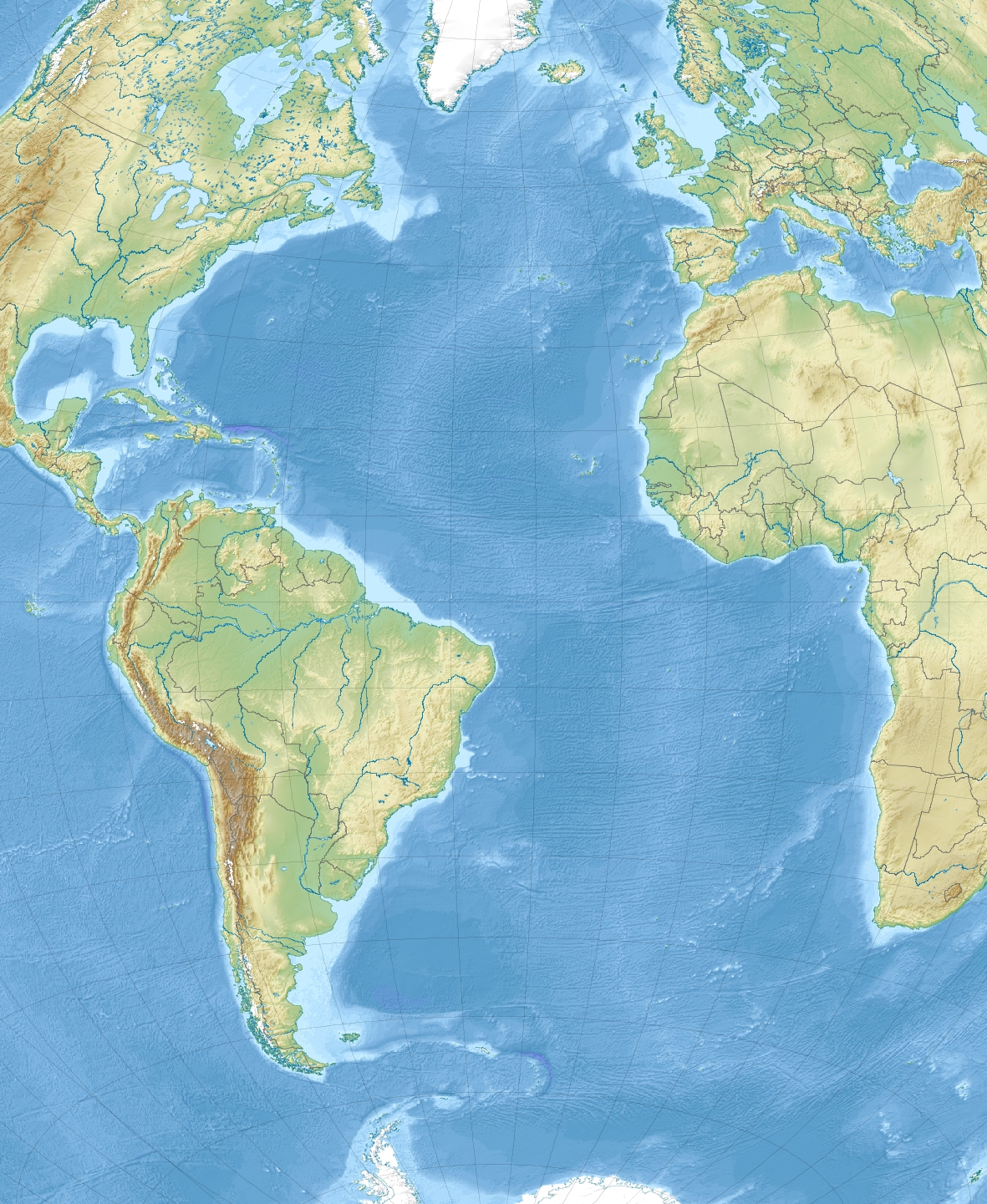
- Location within Atlantic Ocean
- Location: Southern Atlantic Ocean
- Coordinates: 15°0′S 5°0′W
- Type: Ocean
- Basin countries: Southwestern coast of Africa, Brazil

Aethiopian, Æthiopian, Æthiopic or Ethiopian Sea or Ocean (Latin: Æthiopicum Mare or Oceanus Æthiopicus; Arabic: البحر الأثيوبي) was the names given to the southern half of the Atlantic Ocean in classical geographical works. The name appeared in maps from ancient times up to the turn of the 19th century.

== Geography ==
The originally Greek term Okeanos Aithiopos is an old name for what is now called the South Atlantic Ocean. It is separated from the North Atlantic Ocean by a narrow region between Natal, Brazil and Monrovia, Liberia. The term Ethiopian Ocean appeared until the mid-19th century, for example on the map Accuratissima Totius Africae in Lucem Producta, engraved by Johann Baptist Homann and Frederick de Wit and published by Jacob von Sandrart in Nürnberg in 1702.

The name Aethiopian was related to the fact that, historically, Africa south of Egypt was known as Aethiopia. Nowadays the classical use of the term has become obsolete. Also the nation of Ethiopia, then known as Abyssinia, is located nowhere near its namesake body of water but in the opposite eastern end of Africa which is much closer to the Indian Ocean and its subset the Red Sea.

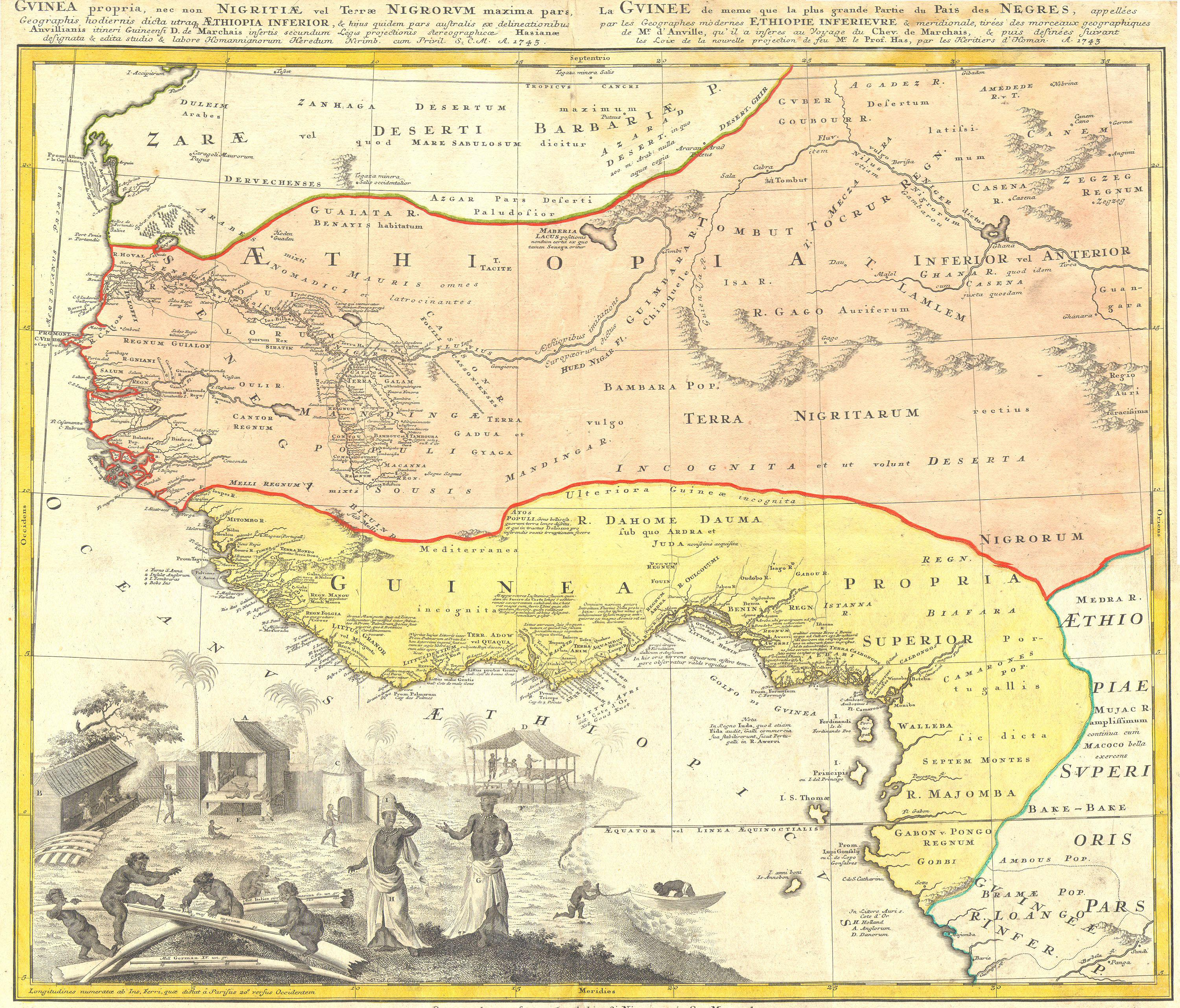
Oceanus Æthiopicus in the map Guinea Propria, Nec Non Nigritiae Vel Terrae Nigorum-Aethiopia Inferior, 1743

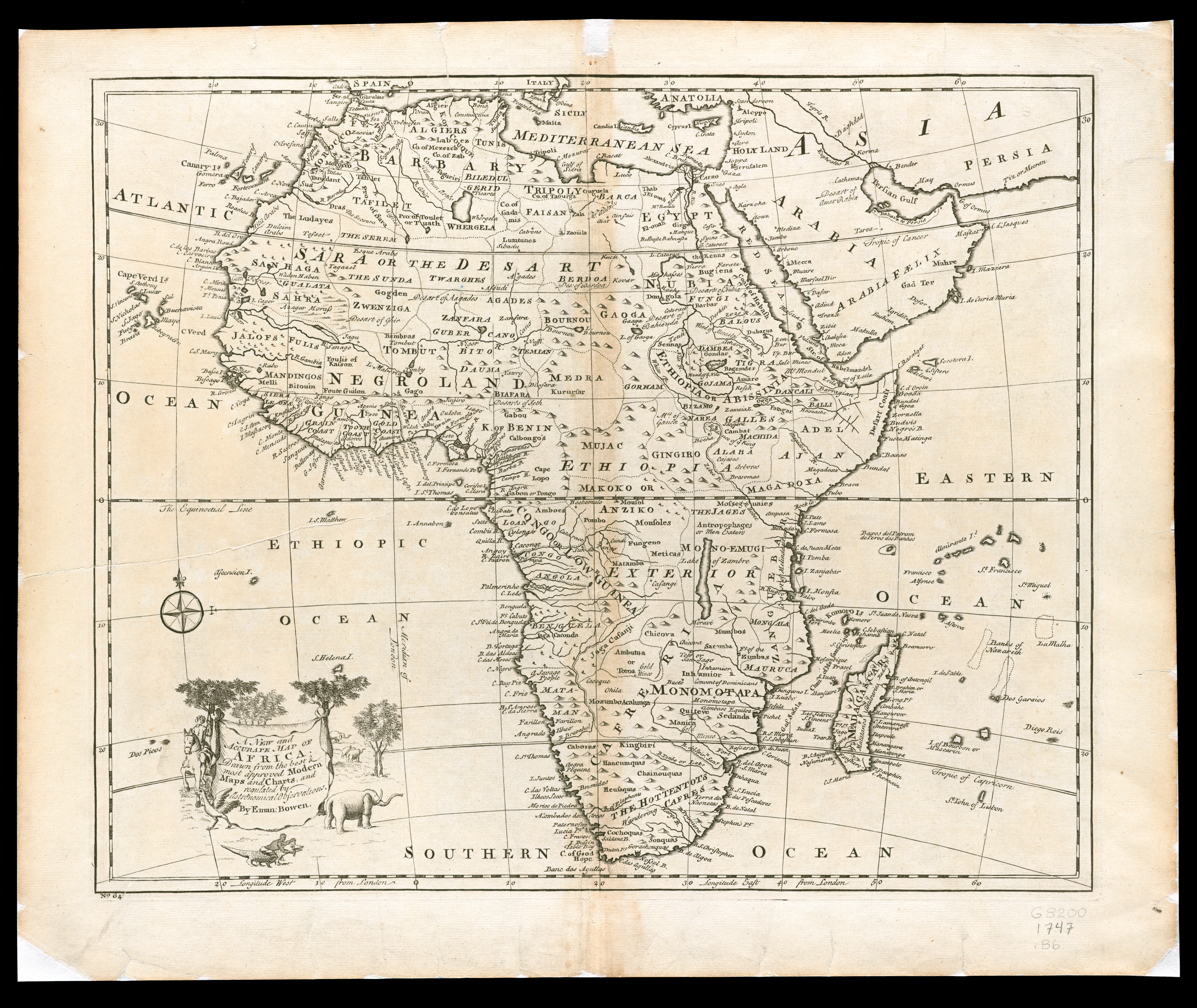
1747 map with all the oceans surrounding the African continent

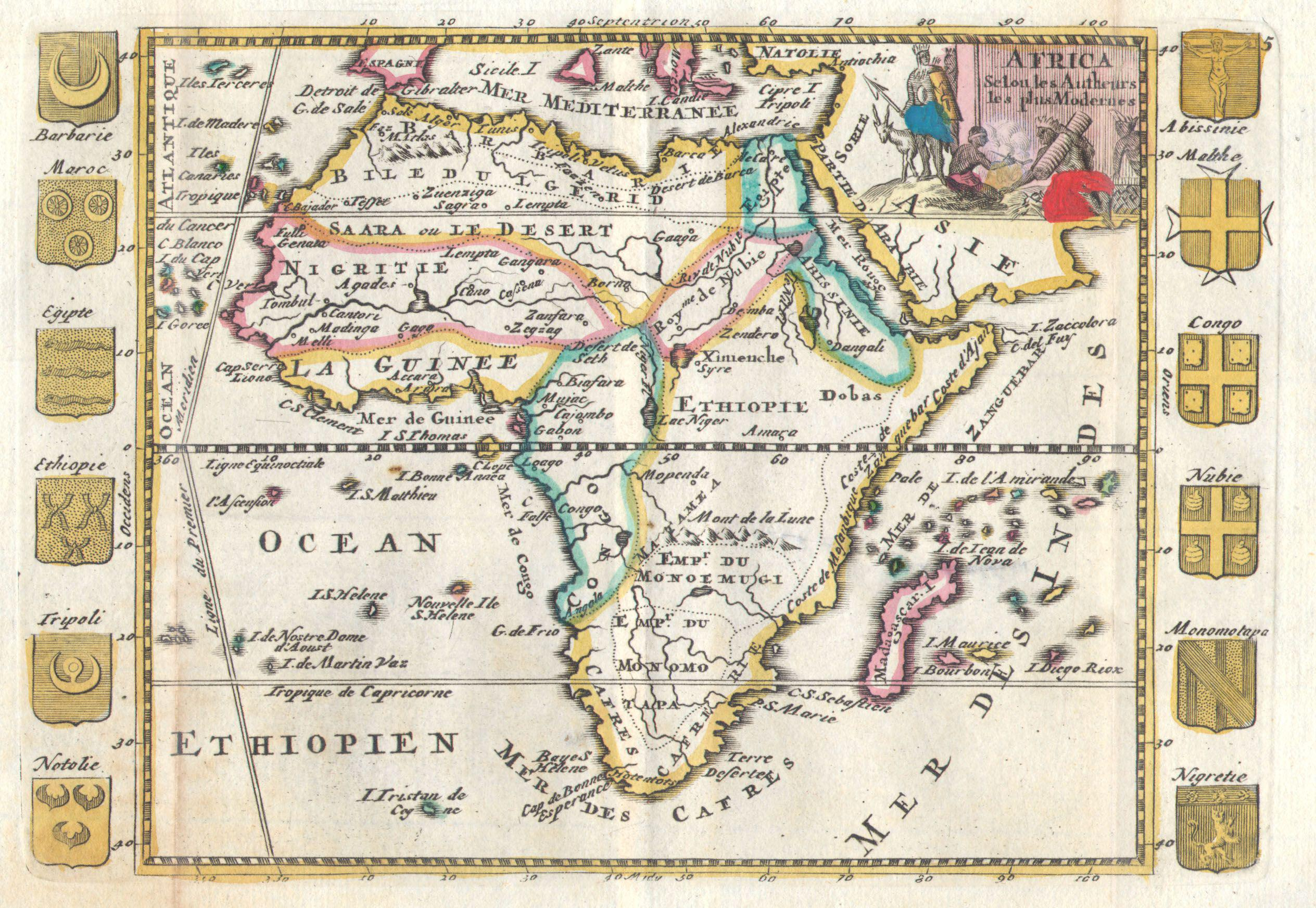
Ocean Ethiopien in a 1710 Daniel de La Feuille map of Africa

== History ==
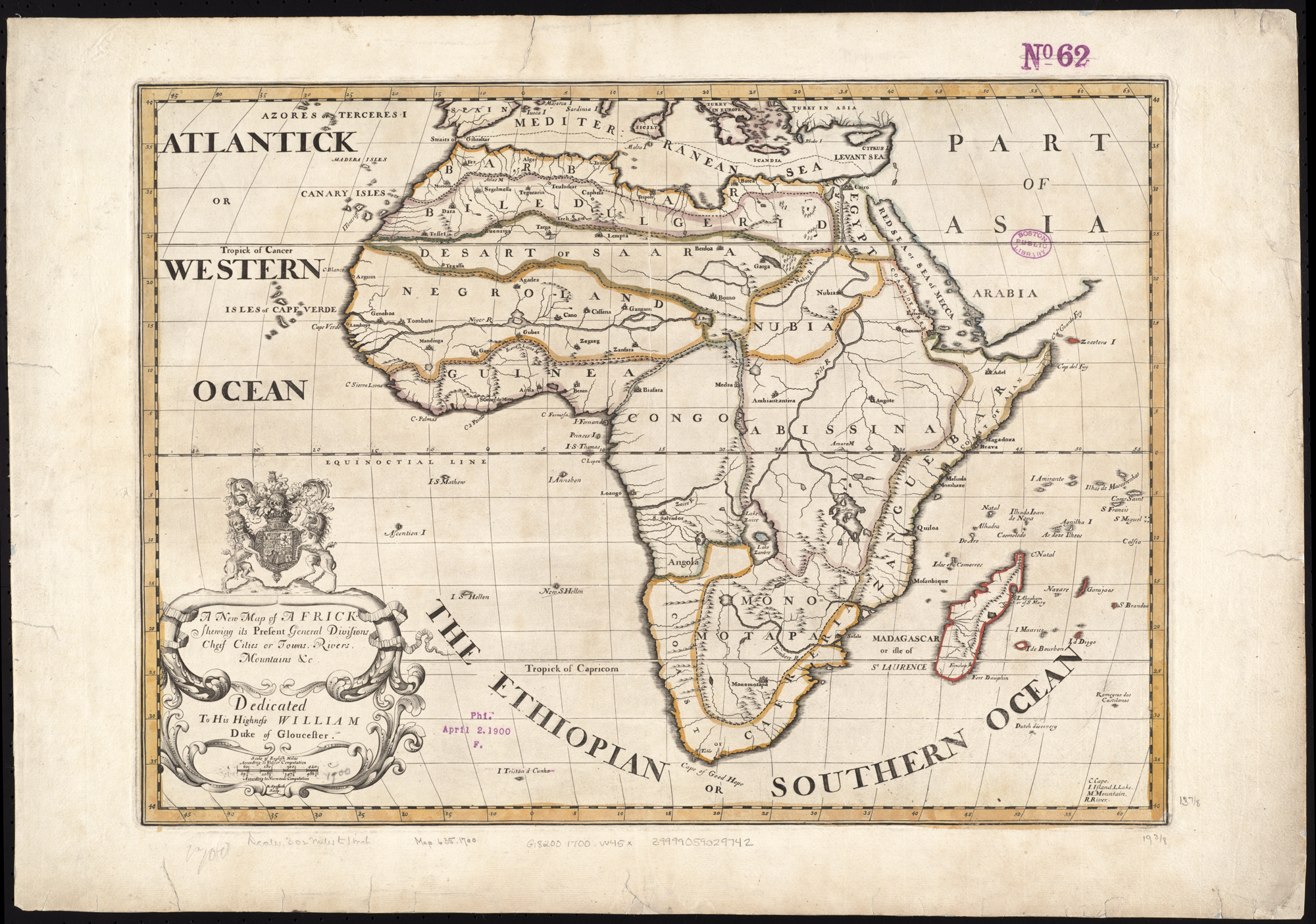
"Southern Ocean" as an alternative name for the Aethiopian Ocean in a 1700 map of Africa

Ancient Greek historians Diodorus and Palaephatus mentioned that the Gorgons lived in the Gorgades, islands in the Aethiopian Sea. The main island was called Cerna and, according to Henry T. Riley, these islands may correspond to Cape Verde.

Portugal claimed the Aethiopian Sea as its mare clausum during the Age of Discovery.

On 16th-century maps, the name of the Northern Atlantic Ocean was Sinus Occidentalis, while the central Atlantic, southwest of present-day Liberia, appeared as Sinus Atlanticus and the Southern Atlantic as Mare Aethiopicum.

By the 17th century, John Seller divided the Atlantic Ocean in two parts by means of the equator. He named the northern portion of the Atlantic "Mar del Nort" and the southern part "Oceanus Æthiopicus" in his Atlas Maritimus published in 1672. Edward Wright did not label the North Atlantic at all but called the portion south of the equator the "Aethiopian Sea" in a map that was published posthumously in 1683. John Thornton used the term in "A New Map of the World" from 1703.

Decades after the terms Ethiopian Ocean or Ethiopian Sea had fallen into disuse to refer to the Southern Atlantic Ocean, botanist William Albert Setchell (1864–1943) used the term for the sea around certain islands close to Antarctica.

== See also ==
- Ethiopia (mythology)
- Gorgons
