= Instituto San Sebastián Yumbel =

Instituto San Sebastián de Yumbel

Location
- Castellón N°521 (Primary School) Quezada N°451 (High School); Yumbel, Bío Bío Province; Chile
- Coordinates: 37°05′49″S 72°33′44″W

Information
- Type: Private pre-school, primary and secondary school
- Motto: Spanish: Educar, Evangelizar y Servir (Educate, evangelize and serve)
- Religious affiliation: Catholicism
- Founded: 6 October 1879; 146 years ago
- Founder: José Hipólito Salas
- Website: www.issyumbel.cl

The Instituto San Sebastián de Yumbel (ISS), initially known as Seminario de San Sebastián de Yumbel, is a private Catholic pre-school, primary, and secondary school located in Yumbel, Bío Bío Province, Chile.

The school offers education at the Pre-school (Educación Parvularia), Primary (Educación Básica) and Secondary (Enseñanza Media) levels. It is one of the oldest institutions in the Bio Bio Region, playing an important philanthropic role in the Yumbel commune.

== History ==
The institute was founded by Archbishop José Hipólito Salas, with the personal approval of Pope Pius IX. It was initially known as Seminario de San Sebastián de Yumbel (English: Seminary of St. Sebastian of Yumbel) which appeared in public records until 1905.

The school was founded upon Catholic-based prayer and theological discussion, which remain important to school practices and ceremonies.

The school underwent a large-scale renovation in late 2007, including a new pavilion, classrooms, restrooms, showers and a computer lab. The renovations, managed by the Educational Foundation Cristo Rey, were a major success.

== Institutional anthem ==
| Spanish | Literal English translation |
|---|---|
| Nuestro canto es un eco de victoria ¡cantemos con ardor! los siglos han forjado nuestra historia y es Chile nuestro honor. Compartamos con todos la alegría que da nuestro Patrono Sebastián mañana serviremos noche y día si hoy queremos estudiar. Nuestra patria hoy de los niños reclama le brindemos honor de amistad se encienda en todos la llama salva al mundo el amor. Hollando el bajo suelo sigamos peregrinos de la vida a todos muestra el Instituto al Cielo y a ser hermanos de todos convida. | Our song is an echo of victory Let us sing with fire! The centuries have forged our history And Chile is our honor. Share with everyone the joy That gives our Patron Sebastián; Tomorrow we will serve night and day If today we want to study Our homeland today of children complains We honor you Of friendship turn on In all the flame Save the world love. Hiding the low ground Follow pilgrims of life Everyone shows the Institute to Heaven; And to be brothers of all invites. |

== See also ==
- Catholic Church in Chile
- Education in Chile
