= Isis and Osiris =

Isis and Osiris are two ancient Egyptian deities.

Isis and Osiris may also refer to:

Canadian opera "Isis and Osiris, Gods of Egypt" by composer Peter-Anthony Togni and librettist Sharon Singer

- The Osiris myth, in which Isis and Osiris are central characters
- De Iside et Osiride, an essay on ancient Egyptian religion by Plutarch, included in his collection Moralia
- "O Isis und Osiris", an aria in the opera The Magic Flute
- The second track on Ayreon's third album Into the Electric Castle
