= Pseudo-Sophronius =

Pseudo-Sophronius (7th century) was an anonymous Greek orthodox chronicler who recorded an apocryphal account of Bartholomew the Apostle's travels to and preaching in Armenia and India.

== Sources ==
- Vadakkekara, Benedict (2007). Origin of Christianity in India: A Historiographical Critique. Delhi: Media House. ISBN 9788174952585.
