= CDS ISIS =

Proprietary database management system

CDS/ISIS is a software package for generalised Information Storage and Retrieval systems developed, maintained and disseminated by UNESCO. It was first released in 1985 and since then over 20,000 licences have been issued by UNESCO and a worldwide network of distributors. It is particularly suited to bibliographical applications and is used for the catalogues of many small and medium-sized libraries. Versions have been produced in Arabic, Chinese, English, French, German, Portuguese, Russian and Spanish amongst other languages. UNESCO makes the software available free for non-commercial purposes, though distributors are allowed to charge for their expenses.

CDS/ISIS is an acronym which stands for Computerised Documentation Service / Integrated Set of Information Systems. In 2003 it was stated that "This package is accepted by libraries in the developing countries as a standard software for information system development".

The original CDS/ISIS ran on an IBM mainframe and was designed in the mid-1970s under Mr Giampaolo Del Bigio for UNESCO's Computerized Documentation System (CDS). It was based on the internal ISIS (Integrated Set of Information Systems) at the International Labour Organization in Geneva.

In 1985 a version was produced for mini- and microcomputers programmed in Pascal. It ran on an IBM PC under MS-DOS. Winisis, the Windows version, first demonstrated in 1995, may run on a single computer or in a local area network. A JavaISIS client/server component was designed in 2000, allowing remote database management over the Internet from Windows, Linux and Macintosh computers. Furthermore, GenISIS allows the user to produce HTML Web forms for CDS/ISIS database searching. The ISIS_DLL provides an API for developing CDS/ISIS based applications. The OpenIsis library, developed independently from 2002 to 2004, provided another API for developing CDS/ISIS-like applications.

The most recent effort towards a completely renewed FOSS, Unicode implementation of CDS/ISIS is the J-Isis project, developed by UNESCO since 2005 and currently maintained by Mr Jean Claude Dauphin.

== Related tool ==
- IDIS is a tool for direct data exchange between CDS/ISIS and IDAMS.
