= HMS Isis =

Six ships of the British Royal Navy, and four tenders of the RNVR, have been named HMS Isis, after the Egyptian goddess Isis.

- The first Isis was a 50-gun fourth rate probably launched in 1744 as Colchester.
- The second HMS Isis (1747) was the French ship Diamant captured in 1747 and converted to a 50-gun fourth-rate, continuing in use until 1766.
- The third HMS Isis (1774) was a 50-gun fourth rate launched in 1774, and broken up in 1810.
- The fourth HMS Isis (1819) was a 50-gun fourth rate launched in 1819, hulked in 1861 and sold 1867.
- The fifth HMS Isis (1896) was an Eclipse-class protected cruiser in use from 1896 to 1920.
- The sixth HMS Isis (D87) was an I-class destroyer launched in 1936.
- HMS Isis (M2010) was a Ley-class minehunter launched in 1955 as HMS Cradley, renamed HMS Isis in 1963 and sold 1982.
