= Pseudo-Jerome =

Name given to several authors

Pseudo-Jerome is the name given to several authors misidentified as, or pseudepigraphically claiming to be, Saint Jerome. A principal writing identified as "Pseudo Jerome" is the ninth-century writing the Epistle of Pseudo-Jerome to Paula and Eustochium, a sermon on the Assumption of Mary.

Other works are also pseudonymously attributed to Jerome, including a Handbook on the Apocalypse, a kind of preacher's manual containing glosses (brief 1-2 sentence explanations) of passages from the Book of Revelation. This work was likely composed by an Irish bishop writing from continental Europe in the late 7th century.
