= ASET (education) =

Former national awarding body for education in the United Kingdom

ASET was a national awarding body in the United Kingdom with offices in Macclesfield and York. It provided Awards and Qualifications in post-14 vocational and higher education and training.

ASET was recognised by the UK Government Department of Innovation, Universities and Skills, by the Learning and Skills Council (LSC) and by the Qualifications and Curriculum Authority (QCA). ASET was ISO 9000:2000-accredited, an Investor in People (IiP) and a UK limited company.

ASET worked extensively across the UK with a growing International network for many years. In the UK more than 3,000 ASET learning programmes were delivered by over 800 licensed centres including FE colleges, universities, sixth form and community colleges, LEAs, employers, government agencies, training companies and not-for-profit organisations. More than 100,000 learners received ASET certificates every year.

The CEO Chris Daniel resigned in 2007 and company was acquired by EDI. EDI was subsequently acquired by Pearson in 2011. ASET went into liquidation from 2016 onwards, fully dissolving in 2017 via Fisher partners.
