= ASET (professional body) =

UK charity promoting work-based learning

- Company type: A registered charity
- Founded: 1982
- Headquarters: Sheffield, England
- Website: www.asetonline.org

ASET, the Work based and Placement Learning Association, was established in 1982, and is now the leading professional body for placement and employability staff in UK Higher Education Providers (HEPs). ASET is a registered charity based in Sheffield, England, run by, and for, work based learning practitioners offering support, advice, guidance and representation to all professionals who work in the field. ASET seeks to advance the prevalence, effectiveness and quality of work based and placement learning in Higher Education, by promoting and publishing research.

ASET aims to:

- Provide strategic leadership and a national voice as a central agency
- Champion the concept of work based and placement learning
- Advise on best practice, providing training and staff development opportunities for the dissemination of good practice across the sector
- Offer informed and authoritative representation, advice and support to all professionals working in the field
- Provide a forum for groups and individuals to discuss and formulate policies
- Prepare, develop and publish information and research relating to work based and placement learning

ASET provides training for over 1500 staff managing all forms of work placements through a regular staff development programme of workshops and an annual conference held in early September 2019. ASET has provided leadership in the development of Good Practice Guides in many areas including Health and Safety for Student Placements and Supporting Students with Disabilities on Placement and also the promotion and dissemination of a series of ASET Viewpoints on topical issues.
