= Iset =

st t H8 B1
Iset
in hieroglyphs
Era: New Kingdom
(1550–1069 BC)

Iset or Aset is an Ancient Egyptian name, meaning "(She) of the throne". It was the name of the goddess better known by her Greek name Isis.

== People with the name ==
Notable bearers of the name were:

- Iset (queen), mother of Thutmose III
- Iset (daughter of Thutmose III), a daughter of Thutmose III and Hatshepsut-Meryetre, shown on the statue of her maternal grandmother Huy
- Iset (daughter of Amenhotep III), daughter of Amenhotep III and Tiye
- Iset Ta-Hemdjert, wife of Ramesses III
- Iset (priestess), God's Wife of Amun

== In popular culture ==
"Aset" is the name of the lead single from the 2017 album 20s A Difficult Age by recording artist Marcus Orelias.
