= East Africa =

Subregion of Africa

- Countries: Sovereign states (18): Burundi; Comoros; Djibouti; Eritrea; Ethiopia; Kenya; Madagascar; Malawi; Mauritius; Mozambique; Rwanda; Seychelles; Somalia; South Sudan; Tanzania; Uganda; Zambia; Zimbabwe; De facto state (1): Somaliland
- Territories: Dependent territories (2): British Indian Ocean Territory (disputed); French Southern Territories (partially disputed); Internal territories (2): Mayotte (disputed); Réunion (France)
- Time zones: UTC+02:00; UTC+03:00; UTC+04:00

Regions of the African Union: Central Eastern Northern Southern Western

East Africa, also known as Eastern Africa or the East of Africa, is a region at the eastern edge of the African continent, distinguished by its unique geographical, historical, and cultural landscape. Defined in varying scopes, the region is recognized in the United Nations Statistics Division scheme as encompassing 18 sovereign states and four territories. It includes the Horn of Africa to the north, African Great Lakes to the west, the coast of the Indian ocean to the east, and Southeast Africa to the south.

The geography of East Africa is quite varied, with coastal regions leading up to cooler highlands where large population centers are often located. The climate generally is rather atypical of equatorial regions, being mostly arid or semi-arid, with more moisture as you go further south. The region is regularly affected by North Indian Ocean tropical cyclones near the Horn of Africa, and South-West Indian Ocean tropical cyclones in the south. The extreme climate variability makes the region vulnerable to drought and flood cycles, that in the 20th century has led to food insecurity and climate migration.

Historically the region is thought to be the foundation of humanity, with some of the earliest evidence of human ancestors found in dry highland areas, such as the Rift valley. The populations in the region have been dominated by the Bantu expansion, a mass migration of ethnically Bantu peoples to the region between 2500 and 3000 years ago. During the pre-modern era, connections with sea routes to both Arab regions in the north, and India in the east often had cultural mixing on the coasts, leading to the development of the trade region of the Swahili coast, where the Swahili language developed with loan words from Arabic and other languages in the trade region. The Horn of Africa is home to Cushitic-speaking peoples. In some parts of East Africa, especially in South Sudan, the population largely consists of Nilotic populations.

In modern history, after European Exploration, first Portuguese and then later English and German colonies were formed in the region. Since post-colonial independence the region has grown to be a populous region, with a 2017 estimate of over 537.9 million inhabitants. Tanzania, Kenya, and Ethiopia are some of the largest economies in the region. Many of the countries are still dominated by rural workforces employed in agriculture, but the economies of East Africa are currently growing much faster than other parts of Africa at 6% growth, with Rwanda, Uganda, Kenya and Tanzania outpacing many of the other countries.

== Definitions ==
In a narrow sense, particularly in English speaking contexts, East Africa refers to the area comprising Kenya, Tanzania, and Uganda, largely due to their shared history of British administration and later cooperation through East African regional institutions. Further extending East Africa's definition, the Horn of Africa—comprising Djibouti, Eritrea, Ethiopia, and Somalia—stands out as a distinct geopolitical entity within East Africa.

The East African Community, an economic and political bloc, currently includes the Democratic Republic of the Congo, Somalia, Burundi, Kenya, Rwanda, South Sudan, Uganda and Tanzania. Notably, the African Great Lakes region overlaps significantly with these countries. Adjacent to these mainland territories are island nations and territories such as the Comoros, Mauritius, Seychelles, Réunion, Mayotte, and the Scattered Islands in the Indian Ocean.

Regions including portions of Mozambique and Madagascar, often aligned with Southern Africa, share significant historical and cultural connections with East Africa, particularly through the Indian Ocean's maritime networks. Sudan is also sometimes included due in part because it is a part of the eastern region in African Union (AU) and a member of the Common Market for Eastern and Southern Africa (COMESA) free trade area.

== History ==
=== Prehistory ===
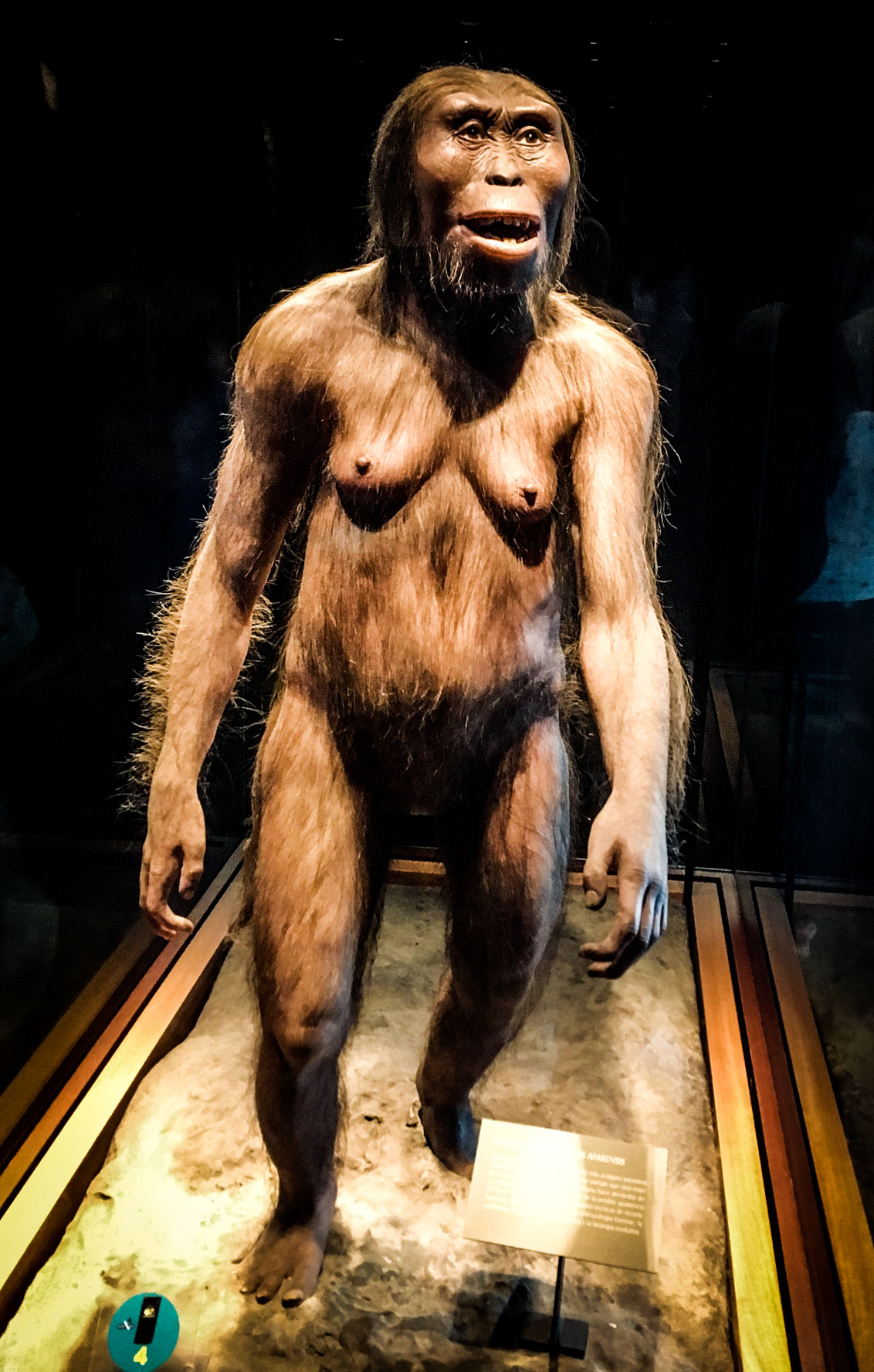
Reconstruction of a female Australopithecus afarensis

According to both genetic and fossil evidence, it has been posited that archaic Homo sapiens evolved into anatomically modern humans in the Horn of Africa around 200,000 years ago and dispersed from there. The recognition of Homo sapiens idaltu and Omo Kibish as anatomically modern humans would justify the description of contemporary humans with the subspecies name Homo sapiens sapiens. Because of their early dating and unique physical characteristics idaltu and kibish represent the immediate ancestors of anatomically modern humans as suggested by the Out-of-Africa theory.

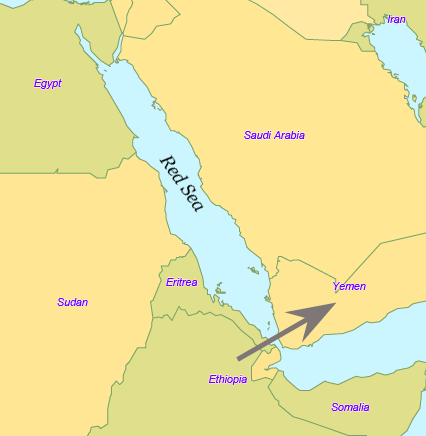
The Bab-el-Mandeb crossing in the Red Sea: now some 12 miles (19 km) wide, narrower in prehistory.

In 2017 finds of modern human remains, dating to ca 300,000 years ago in Jebel Irhoud in Morocco, suggested that modern humans arose earlier and possibly in a larger area of Africa than previously thought.

East Africa is one of the earliest regions where Homo sapiens are believed to have lived. Evidence was found in 2018, dating to about 320,000 years ago, at the Kenyan site of Olorgesailie, of the early emergence of modern behaviors associated with Homo sapiens, including: long-distance trade networks (involving goods such as obsidian), the use of pigments, and the possible making of projectile points. It is observed by the authors of three 2018 studies on the site, that the evidence of these behaviors is approximately contemporary to the earliest known Homo sapiens fossil remains from Africa (such as at Jebel Irhoud and Florisbad), and they suggest that complex and modern behaviors had already begun in Africa around the time of the emergence of Homo sapiens.

In September 2019, scientists reported the computerized determination, based on 260 CT scans, of a virtual skull shape of the last common human ancestor to modern humans/H. sapiens, representative of the earliest Homo sapiens, and suggested that Homo sapiens arose between 350,000 and 260,000 years ago through a merging of populations in South and East Africa.

The migration route of the "Out of Africa" theory probably occurred in East Africa through the Bab-el-Mandeb. Today at the Bab-el-Mandeb straits, the Red Sea is about 12 miles (19 kilometres) wide, but 50,000 years ago it was much narrower and sea levels were 70 meters lower. Though the straits were never completely closed, there may have been islands in between which could be reached using simple rafts.

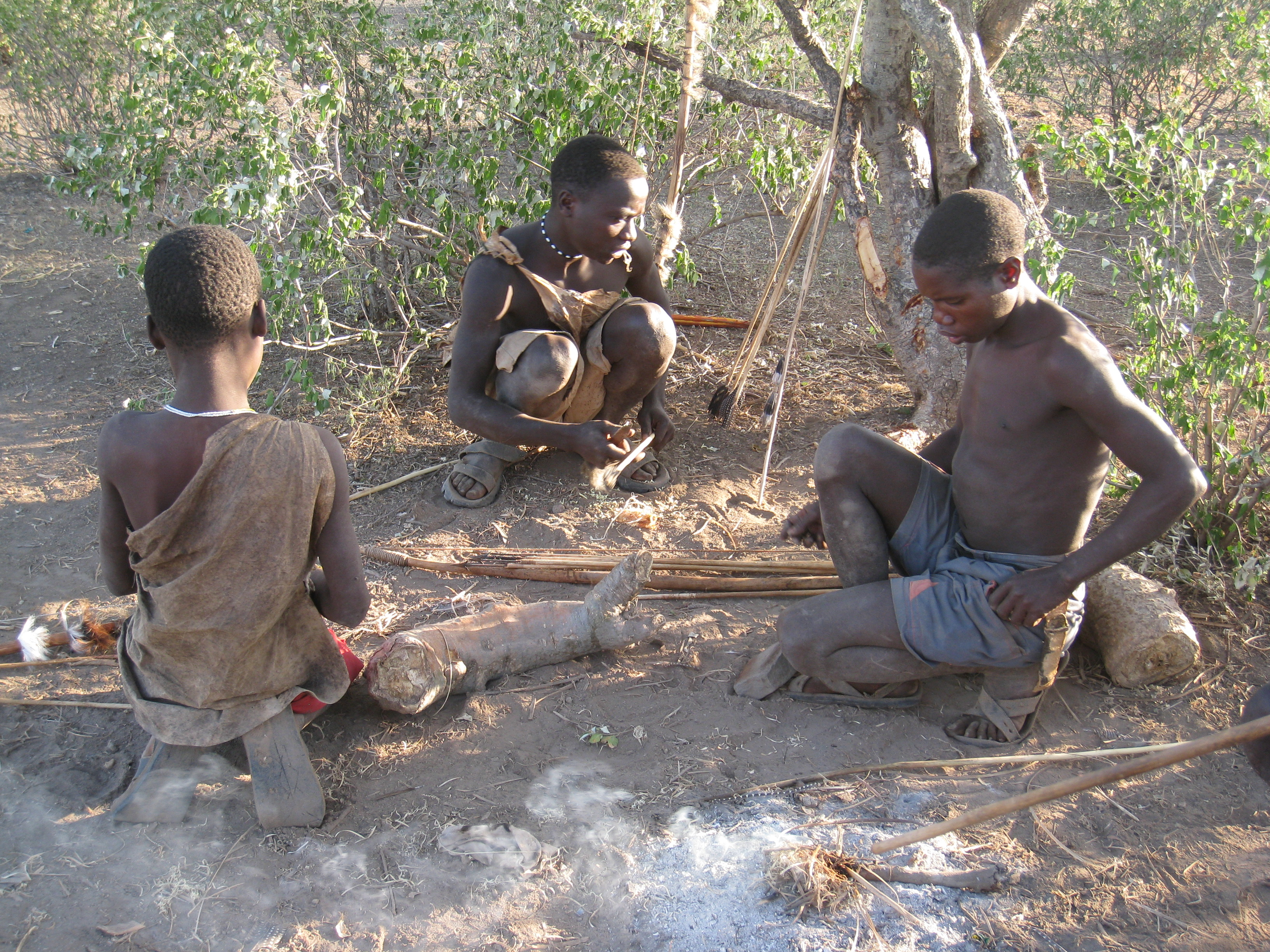
The Hadza people are descendants of Tanzania's aboriginal, pre-Bantu expansion hunter-gatherer population.

Some of the earliest hominin skeletal remains have been found in the wider region, including fossils discovered in the Awash Valley of Ethiopia, as well as in the Koobi Fora in Kenya and Olduvai Gorge in Tanzania.

The southern part of East Africa was occupied until recent times by Khoisan hunter-gatherers, whereas in the Ethiopian Highlands the donkey and such crop plants as teff allowed the beginning of agriculture around 7,000 BCE. Lowland barriers and diseases carried by the tsetse fly, however, prevented the donkey and agriculture from spreading southwards. Only in quite recent times has agriculture spread to the more humid regions south of the equator, through the spread of cattle, sheep and crops such as millet. Language distributions suggest that this most likely occurred from Sudan into the African Great Lakes region, since the Nilotic languages spoken by these pre-Bantu farmers have their closest relatives in the middle Nile basin.

=== Ancient history ===
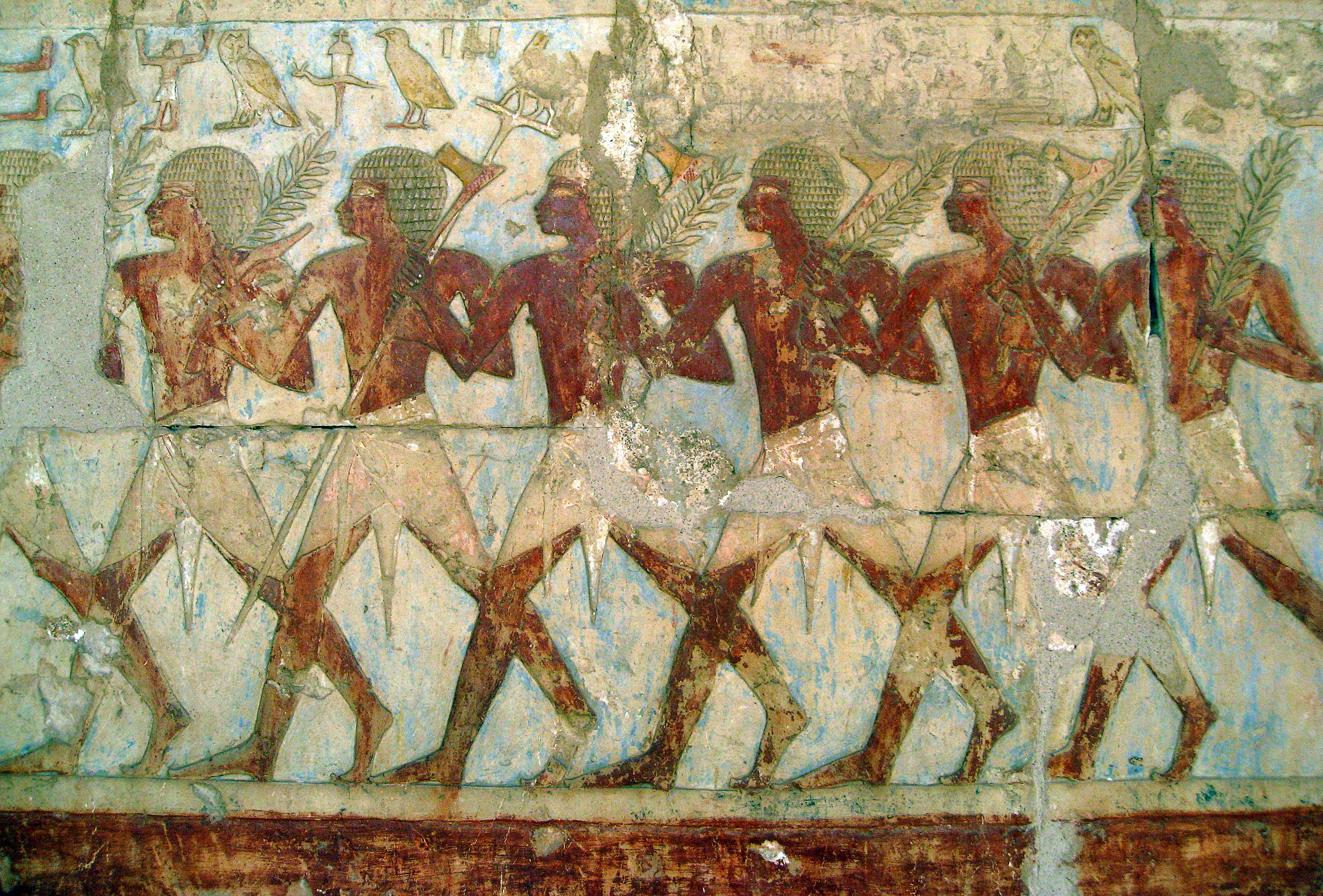
Egyptian soldiers bear tree branches and axes from a trading expedition to the Land of Punt

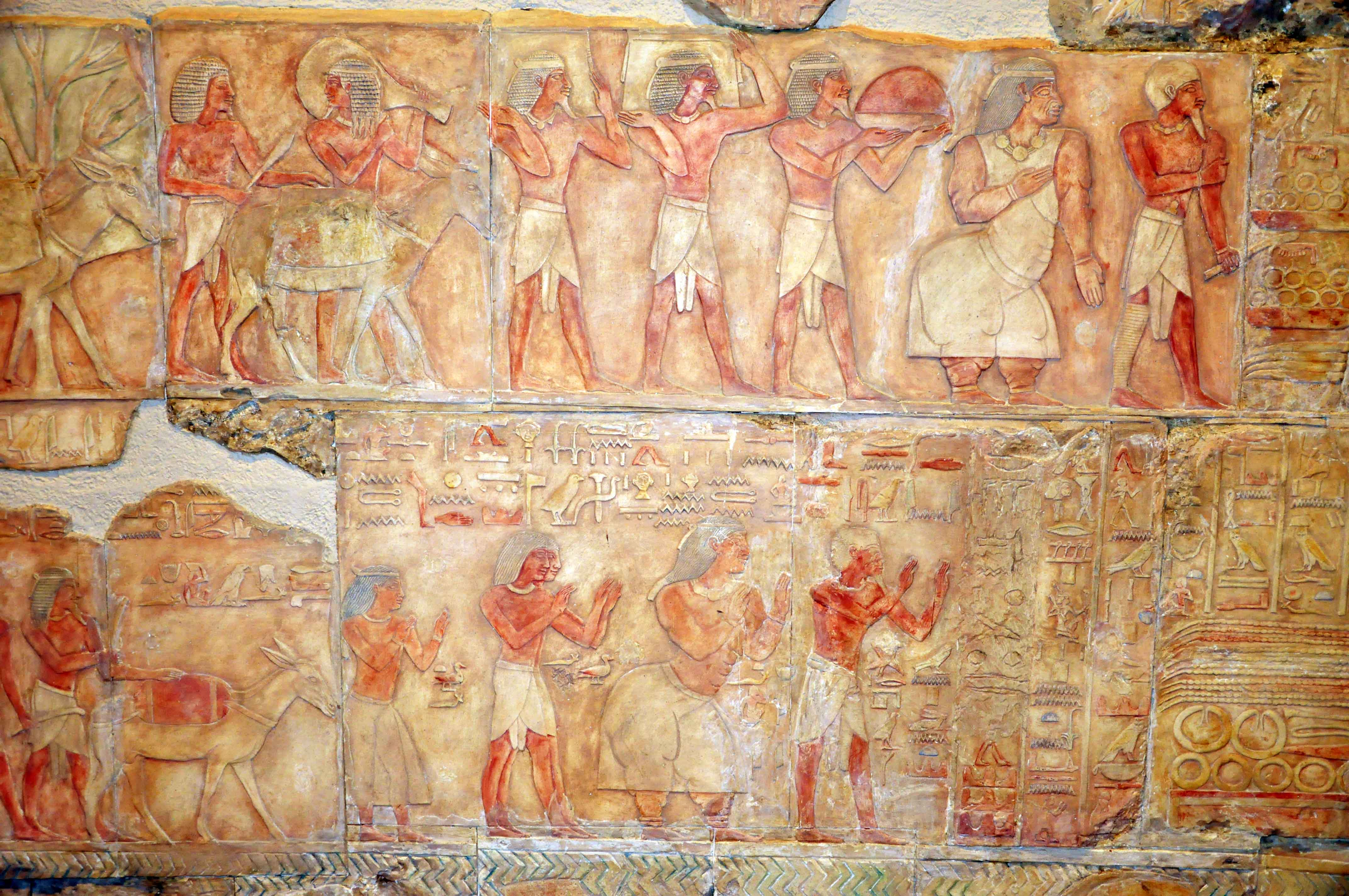
Puntites including their Queen, bearing tributes, represented in the classic reddish-brown colouring as Egyptians

Djibouti, Eritrea, Ethiopia, Somalia, and the Red Sea coast of Sudan are considered the most likely location of the land known to the Ancient Egyptians as Punt. The old kingdom's first mention dates to the 25th century BCE. The ancient Puntites were a nation of people that had close relations with Pharaonic Egypt during the times of Pharaoh Sahure and Queen Hatshepsut.

The Kingdom of Aksum was a trading empire centered Eritrea and northern Ethiopia. It existed from approximately 100–940 CE, growing from the proto-Aksumite Iron Age period c. 4th century BCE to achieve prominence by the 1st century CE. The kingdom is mentioned in the Periplus of the Erythraean Sea as an important marketplace for ivory, which was exported throughout the ancient world. Aksum was at the time ruled by Zoskales, who also governed the port of Adulis. The Aksumite rulers facilitated trade by minting their own Aksumite currency. The state also established its hegemony over the declining Kingdom of Kush.

==== Bantu expansion ====
Between 2500 and 3000 years ago, Bantu-speaking peoples began a millennia-long series of migrations eastward from their homeland around southern Cameroon. This Bantu expansion introduced agriculture into much of the African Great Lakes region. During the following fifteen centuries, the Bantu slowly intensified farming and grazing over all suitable regions of East Africa, in the process making contact with Austronesian- and Arabic-speaking settlers on southern coastal areas. The latter also spread Islam to the coastal belt, but most Bantu remained African Traditional Religion adherents.

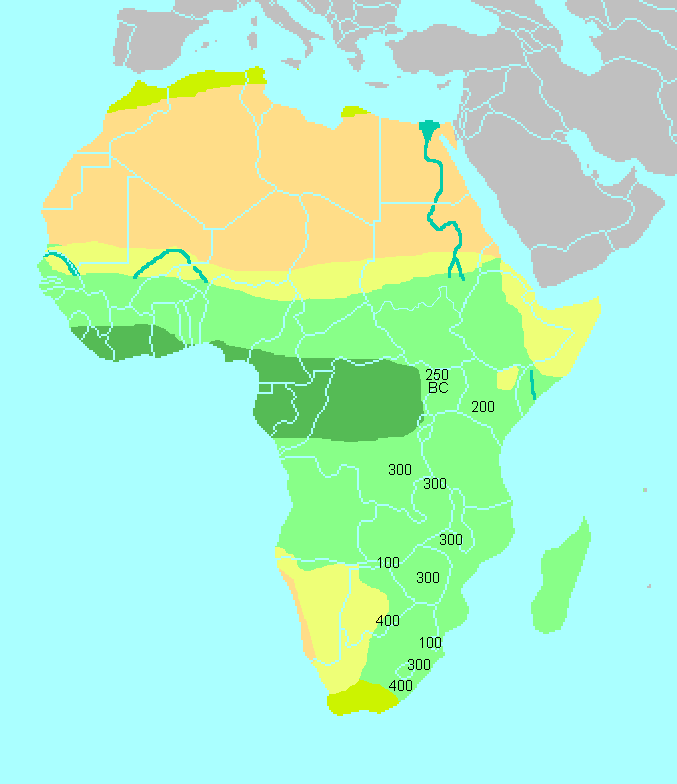
Early Iron Age findings in East and Southern Africa

Over a period of many centuries, most hunting-foraging peoples were displaced and absorbed by incoming Bantu communities, as well as by later Nilotic communities. The Bantu expansion was a long series of physical migrations, a diffusion of language and knowledge out into and in from neighboring populations, and a creation of new societal groups involving inter-marriage among communities and small groups moving to communities and small groups moving to new areas.

After their movements from their original homeland in West Africa, Bantus also encountered in central east Africa peoples of Cushitic origin. As cattle terminology in use amongst the few modern Bantu pastoralist groups suggests, the Bantu migrants would acquire cattle from their new Cushitic neighbors. Linguistic evidence also indicates that Bantus most likely borrowed the custom of milking cattle directly from Cushitic peoples in the area.

On the coastal section of the African Great Lakes region, another mixed Bantu community developed through contact with Muslim Arab and Persian traders, leading to the development of the mixed Arab, Persian and African Swahili City States. The Swahili culture that emerged from these exchanges evinces many Arab and Islamic influences not seen in traditional Bantu culture, as do the many Afro-Arab members of the Bantu Swahili people. With its original speech community centered on the coastal parts of Tanzania (particularly Zanzibar) and Kenya—a seaboard referred to as the Swahili Coast—the Bantu Swahili language contains many Arabic loan-words as a consequence of these interactions. Its important to note that Kiswahili grammar and structure are purely African and Bantu even if its vocabulary has non-African influence in the same way English remains a Germanic language regardless of its vocabulary being heavily influenced by Latin and French among other languages.

The earliest Bantu inhabitants of the east coast of Kenya and Tanzania encountered by these later Arab and Persian settlers have been variously identified with the trading settlements of Rhapta, Azania and Menouthias referenced in early Greek and Chinese writings from 50 CE to 500 CE, ultimately giving rise to the name for Tanzania. These early writings perhaps document the first wave of Bantu settlers to reach central east Africa during their migration.

Between the 14th and 15th centuries, large African Great Lakes kingdoms and states emerged, such as the Buganda and Karagwe kingdoms of Uganda and Tanzania.

=== Modern history ===
==== Arab and Portuguese eras ====
A copy of 17th century philosophical and ethical treatise by Ethiopian philosopher Zara Yaqob

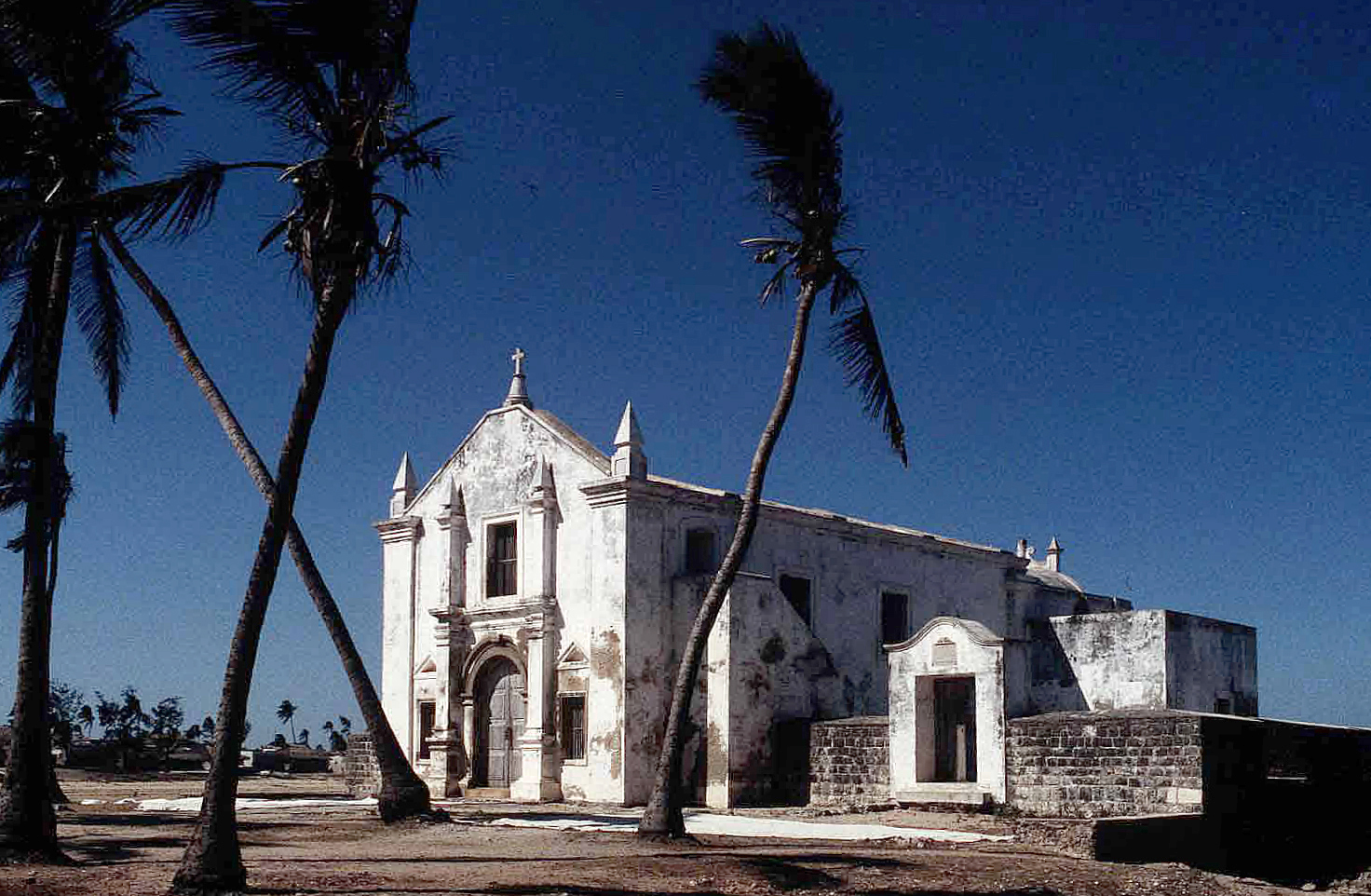
The Island of Mozambique was occupied by Portuguese explorers in the late 15th century.

The Portuguese were the first Europeans to explore the region of current-day Kenya, Tanzania, and Mozambique by sea. Vasco da Gama visited Mombasa in 1498. Da Gama's voyage was successful in reaching India, which permitted the Portuguese to trade with the Far East directly by sea. This in turn challenged the older trading networks of mixed land and sea routes, such as the spice trade routes which utilized the Persian Gulf, Red Sea, and camel caravans to reach the eastern Mediterranean.

The Republic of Venice had gained control over much of the trade routes between Europe and Asia. After traditional land routes to India had been closed by the Ottoman Turks, Portugal hoped to use the sea route pioneered by da Gama to break the once Venetian trading monopoly. Portuguese rule in the African Great Lakes region focused mainly on a coastal strip centered around Mombasa. The Portuguese presence in the area officially began after 1505, when flagships under the command of Don Francisco de Almeida conquered Kilwa, an island located in what is now southern Tanzania.

In March 1505, having received from Manuel I of Portugal the appointment of viceroy of the newly conquered territory in India, he set sail from Lisbon in command of a large and powerful fleet, and arrived in July at Quiloa (Kilwa), which yielded to him almost without a struggle. A much more vigorous resistance was offered by the Moors of Mombasa. However, the town was taken and destroyed, and its large treasures went to strengthen the resources of Almeida. Attacks followed on Hoja (now known as Ungwana, located at the mouth of the Tana River), Barawa, Angoche, Pate and other coastal towns until the western Indian Ocean was a safe haven for Portuguese commercial interests. At other places on his way, such as the island of Angediva, near Goa, and Cannanore, the Portuguese built forts, and adopted measures to secure the Portuguese supremacy.

Portugal's main goal on the Swahili coast was to take control of the spice trade from the Arabs. At this stage, the Portuguese presence in East Africa served the purposes of controlling trade within the Indian Ocean and securing the sea routes linking Europe to Asia. Portuguese naval vessels were very disruptive to the commerce of Portugal's enemies within the western Indian Ocean and were able to demand high tariffs on items transported through the sea due to their strategic control of ports and shipping lanes. The construction of Fort Jesus in Mombasa in 1593 was meant to solidify Portuguese hegemony in the region, but their influence was clipped by the British, Dutch and Omani Arab incursions into the Great Lakes region during the 17th century.

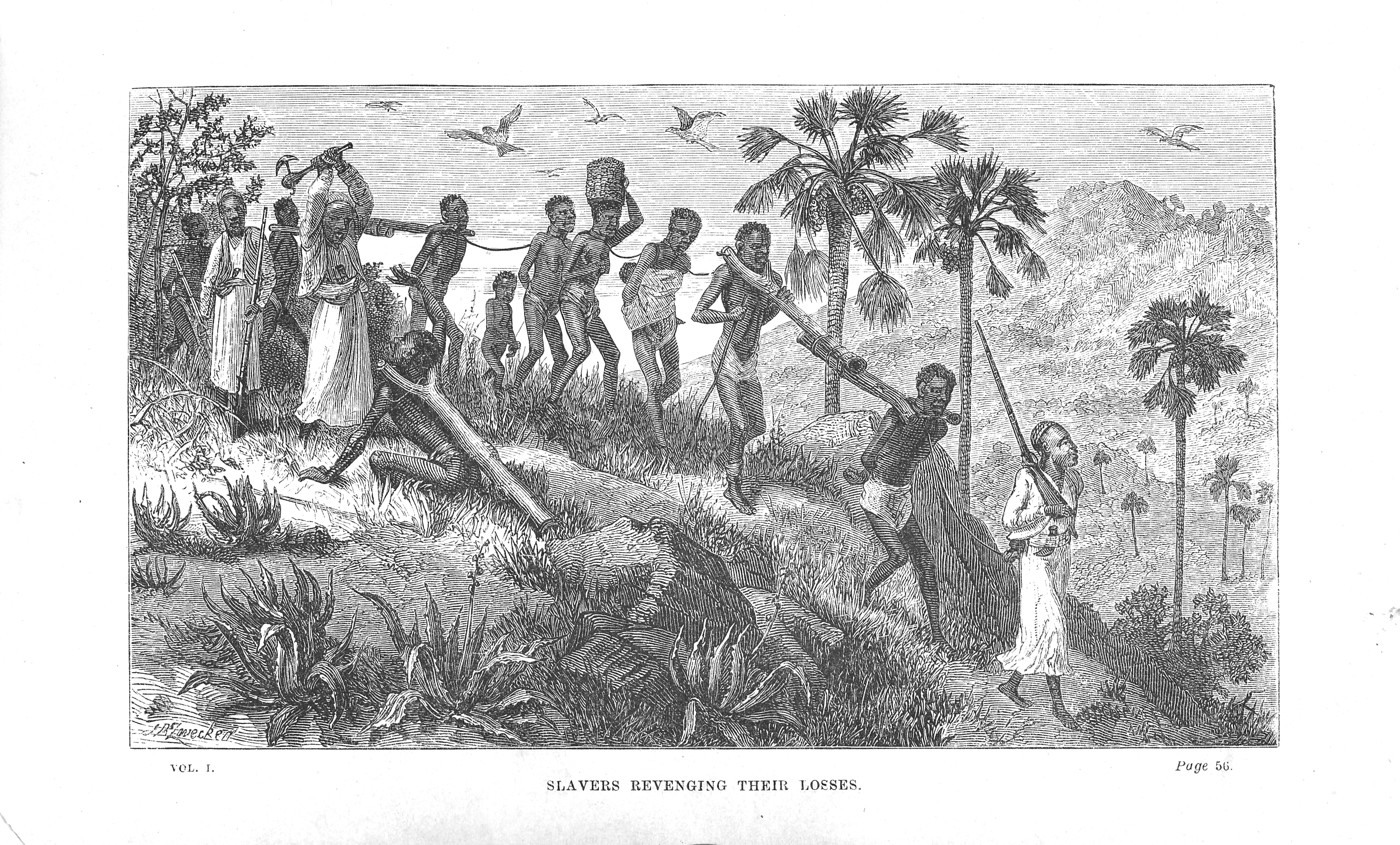
Arab-Swahili slave traders and their captives on the Ruvuma River

The Omani Arabs posed the most direct challenge to Portuguese influence in the African Great Lakes region. By this time, the Portuguese Empire had already lost its interest on the spice trade sea route due to the decreasing profitability of that business. The Arabs reclaimed much of the Indian Ocean trade, forcing the Portuguese to retreat south where they remained in Portuguese East Africa (Mozambique) as sole rulers until the 1975 independence of Mozambique.

Omani Arab colonization of the Kenyan and Tanzanian coasts brought the once independent city-states under closer foreign scrutiny and domination than was experienced during the Portuguese period. Like their predecessors, the Omani Arabs were primarily able only to control the coastal areas, not the interior. However, the creation of clove plantations, intensification of the slave trade and relocation of the Omani capital to Zanzibar in 1839 by Seyyid Said consolidated the Omani power in the region.

Arab governance of all the major ports along the Swahili coast continued until British interests aimed particularly at ending the slave trade and creation of a wage-labour system began to put pressure on Omani rule. By the late nineteenth century, the slave trade on the open seas had been completely outlawed by the British and the Omani Arabs had little ability to resist the British navy's ability to enforce the directive. The Omani presence continued in Zanzibar and Pemba until the Zanzibar Revolution in 1964. However, the official Omani Arab presence in Kenya was checked by German and British seizure of key ports and creation of crucial trade alliances with influential local leaders in the 1880s.

==== Period of European imperialism ====
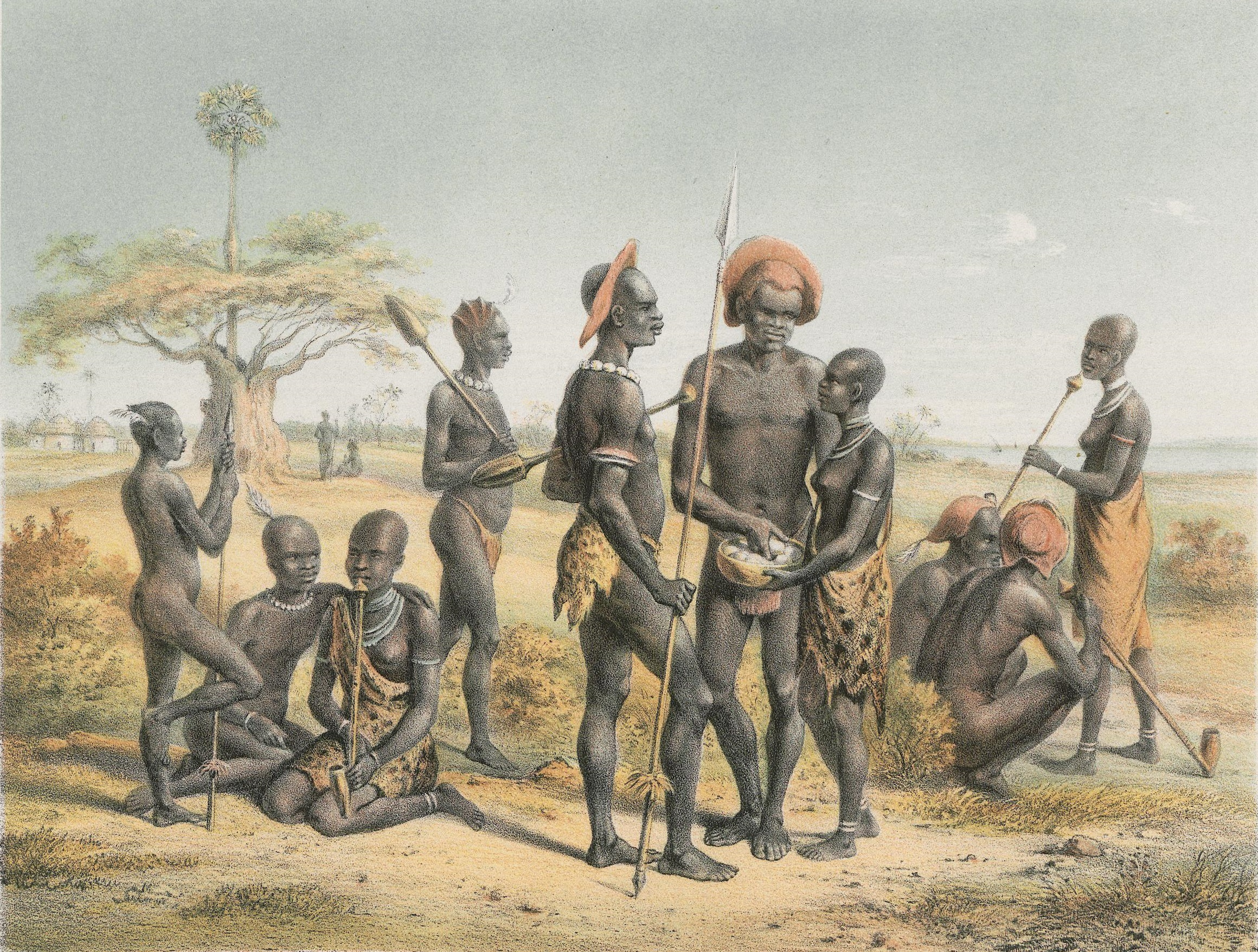
A group of Shilluk in around 1860

Between the 19th and 20th century, East Africa became a theatre of competition between the major imperialistic European nations of the time. The three main colors of the African country were beige, red, and blue. The red stood for the English, blue stood for the French, and the beige stood for Germany during the period of colonialism. During the period of the Scramble for Africa, almost every country in the larger region to varying degrees became part of a European colonial empire.

Portugal had first established a strong presence in southern Mozambique and the Indian Ocean since the 15th century, while during this period their possessions increasingly grew including parts from the present northern Mozambique country, up to Mombasa in present-day Kenya. At Lake Malawi, they finally met the recently created British Protectorate of Nyasaland (nowadays Malawi), which surrounded the homonymous lake on three sides, leaving the Portuguese the control of lake's eastern coast. The British Empire set foot in the region's most exploitable and promising lands acquiring what is today Uganda, and Kenya. The Protectorate of Uganda and the Colony of Kenya were located in a rich farmland area mostly appropriate for the cultivation of cash crops like coffee and tea, as well as for animal husbandry with products produced from cattle and goats, such as goat meat, beef and milk. Moreover, this area had the potential for a significant residential expansion, being suitable for the relocation of a large number of British nationals to the region. Prevailing climatic conditions and the regions' geomorphology allowed the establishment of flourishing European-style settlements like Nairobi, Vila Pery, Vila Junqueiro, Porto Amélia, Lourenço Marques and Entebbe.

The French settled the largest island of the Indian Ocean (and the fourth-largest globally), Madagascar, along with a group of smaller islands nearby, namely Réunion and the Comoros. Madagascar became part of the French colonial empire following two military campaigns against the Kingdom of Madagascar, which it initiated after persuading Britain to relinquish its interests in the island in exchange for control of Zanzibar off the coast of Tanganyika, an important island hub of the spices trade. The British also held a number of island colonies in the region, including the extended archipelago of Seychelles and the rich farming island of Mauritius, previously under the French sovereignty.

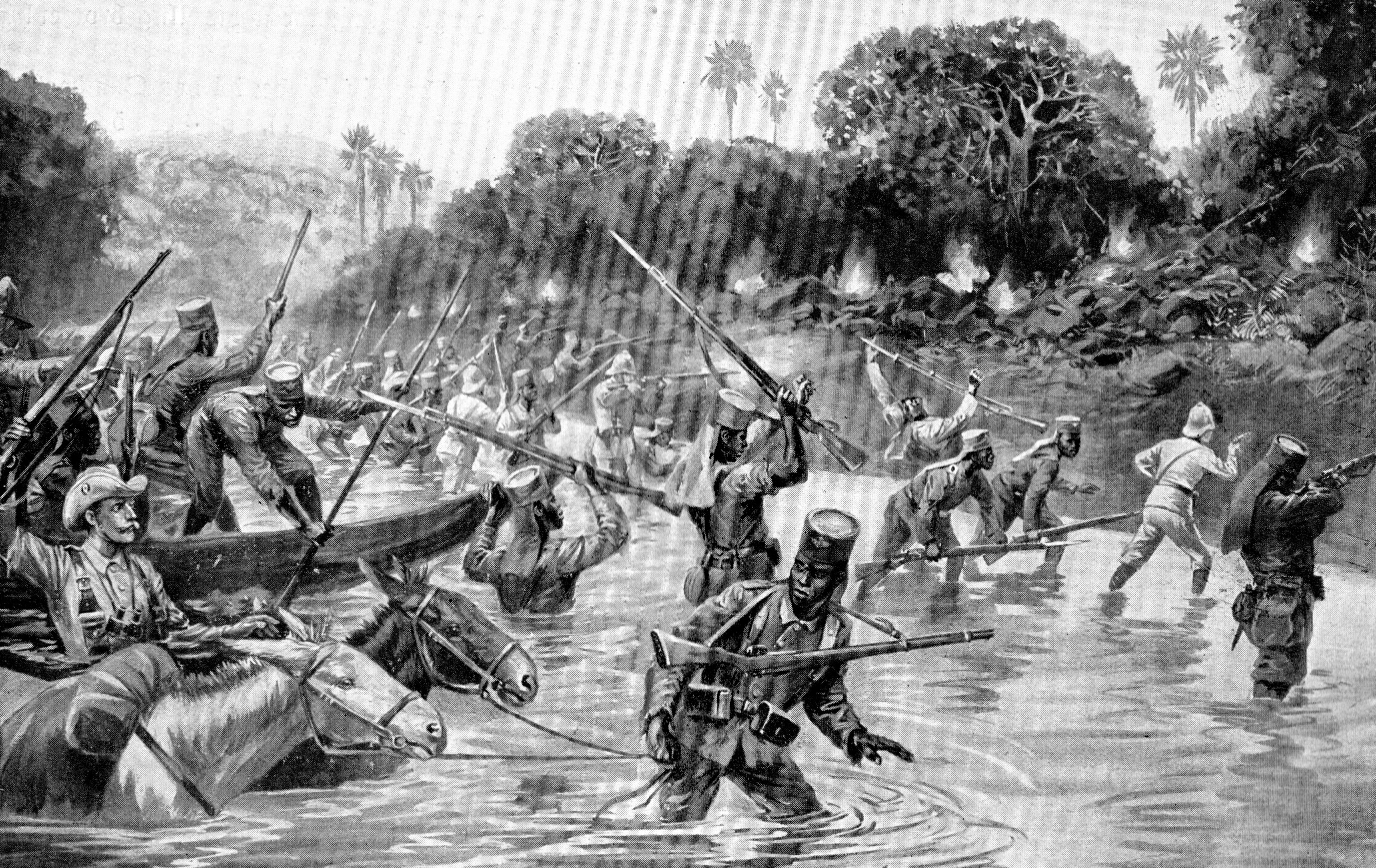
The Battle of Ngomano during the East African campaign in November 1917

The German Empire gained control of a large area named German East Africa, comprising present-day Rwanda, Burundi and the mainland part of Tanzania named Tanganyika. In 1922, the British gained a League of Nations mandate over Tanganyika which it administered until Independence was granted to Tanganyika in 1961. Following the Zanzibar Revolution of 1965, the independent state of Tanganyika formed the United Republic of Tanzania by creating a union between the mainland, and the island chain of Zanzibar. Zanzibar is now a semi-autonomous state in a union with the mainland which is collectively and commonly referred to as Tanzania. German East Africa, though very extensive, was not of such strategic importance as the British Crown's colonies to the north: the inhabitation of these lands was difficult and thus limited, mainly due to climatic conditions and the local geomorphology. Italy gained control of various parts of Somalia in the 1880s. The southern three-fourths of Somalia became an Italian protectorate (Italian Somaliland).

Meanwhile, in 1884, a narrow coastal strip of Somaliland came under British control (British Somaliland). This Somaliland protectorate was just opposite the British colony of Aden on the Arabian Peninsula. With these territories secured, Britain was able to serve as gatekeeper of the sea lane leading to British India. In 1890, beginning with the purchase of the small port town of Asseb from a local sultan in Eritrea, the Italians colonized all of Eritrea.

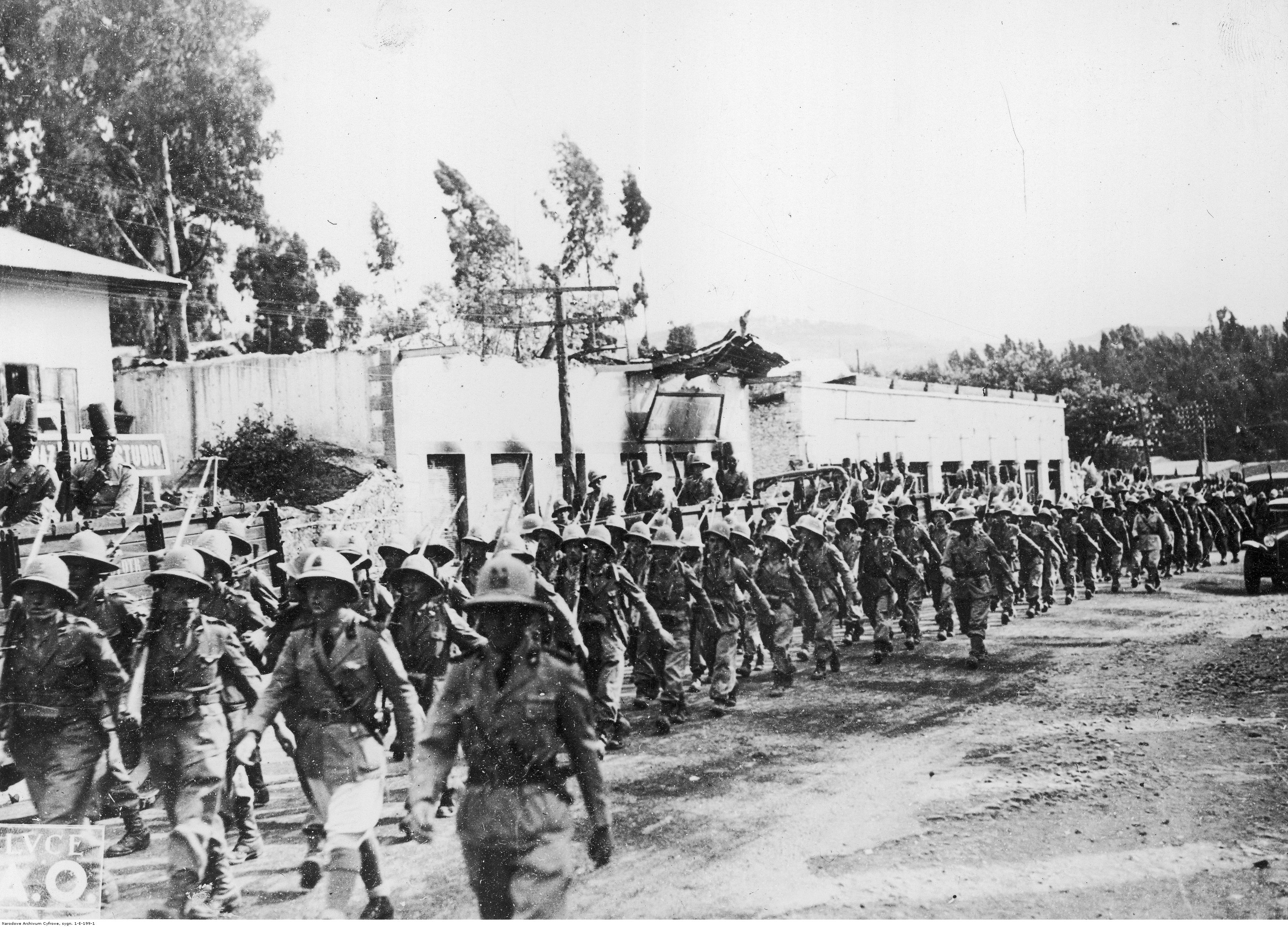
Italian troops in Addis Ababa, 1936

In 1895, from bases in Somalia and Eritrea, the Italians launched the First Italo–Ethiopian War against the Orthodox Empire of Ethiopia. By 1896, the war had become a total disaster for the Italians and Ethiopia was able to retain its independence. Ethiopia remained independent until 1936 when, after the Second Italo-Abyssinian War, it became part of Italian East Africa. The Italian occupation of Ethiopia ended in 1941 during World War II as part of the East African Campaign. The French also staked out an East African outpost on the route to French Indochina. Starting in the 1850s, the small protectorate of Djibouti became French Somaliland in 1897.

==== Conflicts ====
Since the end of colonialism, several East African countries have been riven with military coups, ethnic violence and oppressive dictators. The region has endured the following post-colonial conflicts:

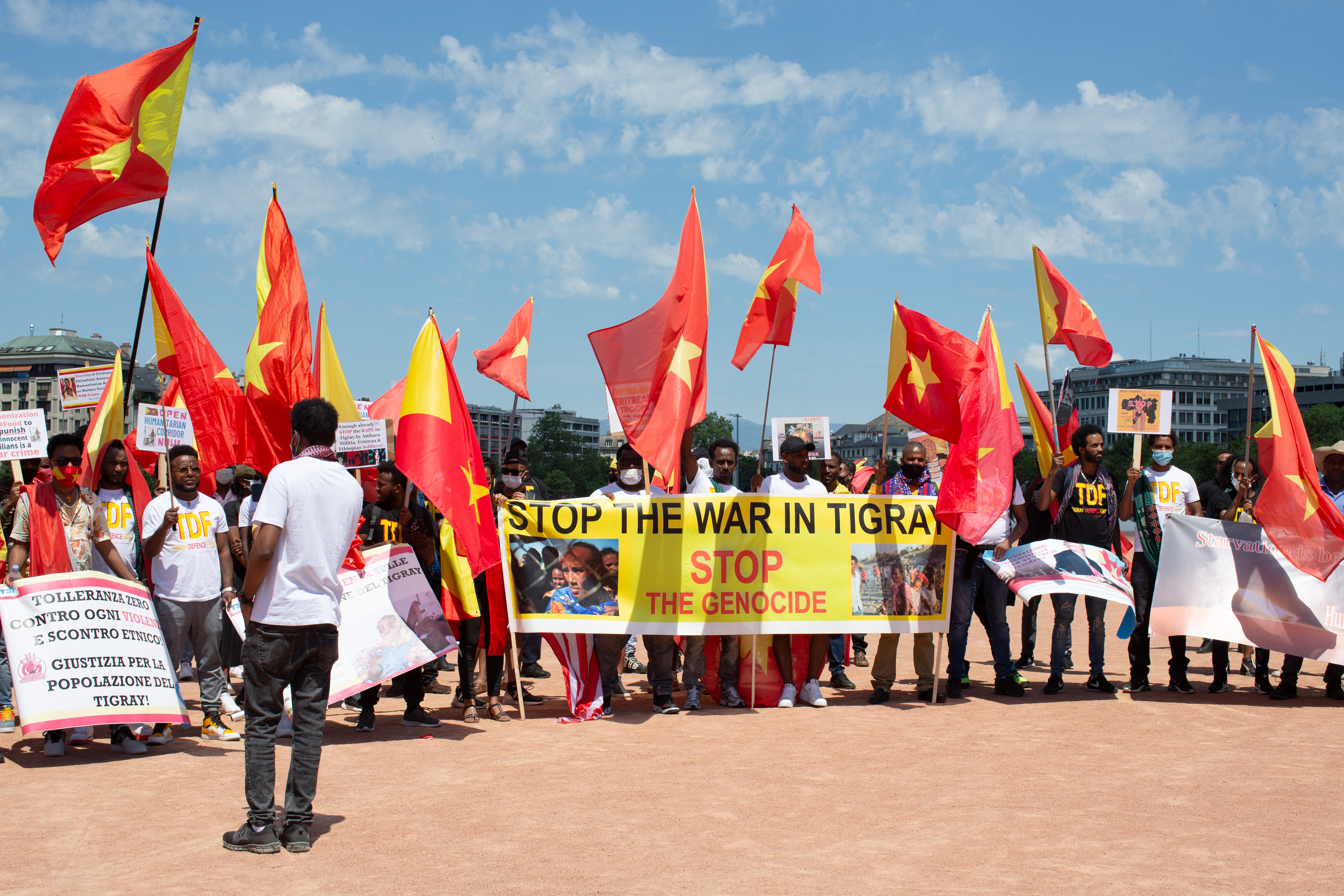
Protest against the war crimes in the Tigray war, June 2021

Northern East Africa
(Horn of Africa)

- Ethiopian Civil War 1974–1991
- Eritrean War of Independence 1961–1991
- Eritrean-Ethiopian War 1998–2000
- Ogaden War 1977–1978
- Dijboutian Civil War 1991–1994
- Somali Civil War 1991–2009
- Tigray war 2020–2022

Northern East Africa
(Sudan)

- First Sudanese Civil War
- Second Sudanese Civil War
- Sudanese nomadic conflicts
- War in Darfur
- War in Sudan 2023–present
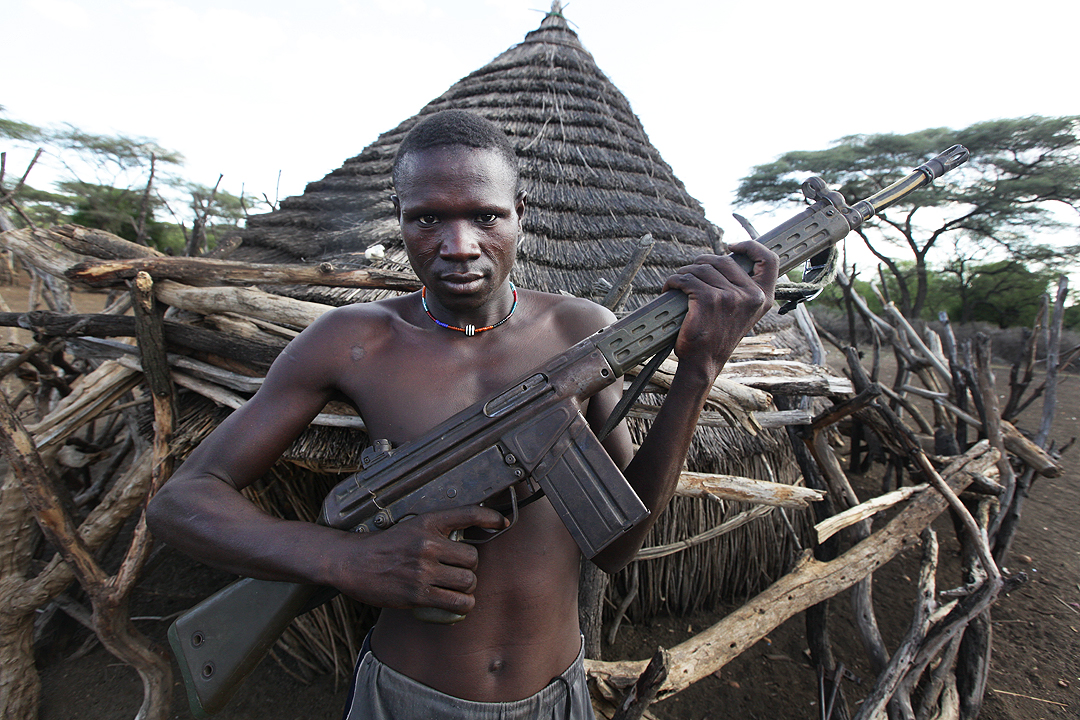
  A South Sudanese man holding a HK G3, May 2011

South Sudan

- Second Sudanese Civil War 1983–2005
- Internal Political-ethnic Conflict 2011–ongoing
- South Sudanese Civil War 2013–2015

Southern East Africa (Southeast Africa)

- Burundian Civil War 1993–2005 and the genocide of Hutus in 1972 and the genocide of Tutsis in 1993
- Uganda–Tanzania War 1978–1979
- Ugandan Bush War 1981–1986
- Lord's Resistance Army insurgency in Uganda, South Sudan and Democratic Republic of the Congo ongoing
- Rwandan Civil War 1990–1993 and the Rwandan genocide against the Tutsi
- Zanzibar Revolution 1964

Externalized conflicts involving Southeast African states

- First Congo War 1996–1997 and Second Congo War 1998–2003
- Kivu Conflict (Laurent Nkunda Rebellion)

Kenya has enjoyed relatively stable governance. However, its politics have been turbulent at times, including the attempted coup d'état in 1982 and the 2007 election riots.

Tanzania has known a stable government since independence although there are significant political and religious tensions resulting from the political union between Tanganyika and Zanzibar in 1964. Zanzibar is a semi-autonomous state in the United Republic of Tanzania.

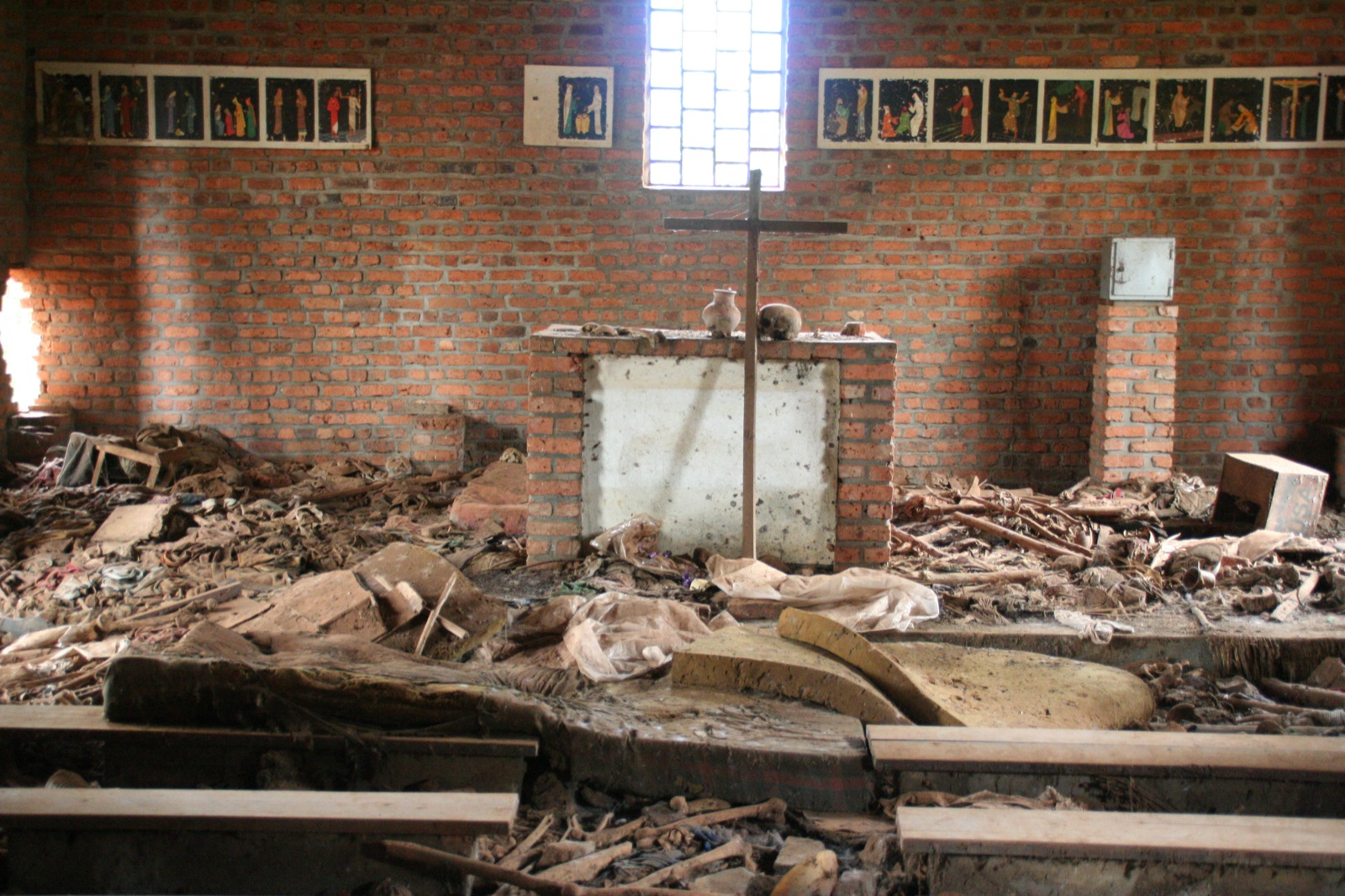
Over 5,000 people seeking refuge in Ntarama church were killed during the 1994 Rwandan genocide.

Tanzania and Uganda fought the Uganda–Tanzania War in 1978–1979, which led to the removal of Uganda's despotic leader Idi Amin.

Burundi, Rwanda, and Uganda have each faced instability and ethnic conflict since independence, most notably, they experienced the 1994 Rwandan genocide and the 1993 Burundi genocide and the subsequent Burundian Civil War. Rwanda and Uganda continue to be involved in related conflicts outside the region.

Djibouti, as well as the Puntland and Somaliland regions of Somalia, have seen relative stability.

South Sudan peacefully seceded from Sudan in 2011, six and a half years after a peace agreement ended the Second Sudanese Civil War. South Sudanese independence was nearly derailed by the South Kordofan conflict, particularly, South Sudanese independence was nearly derailed by a dispute over the status of the Abyei Area, and Abyei and South Kordofan's Nuba Hills both remained sources of tension between Juba and Khartoum as of 2011.

== Geography ==
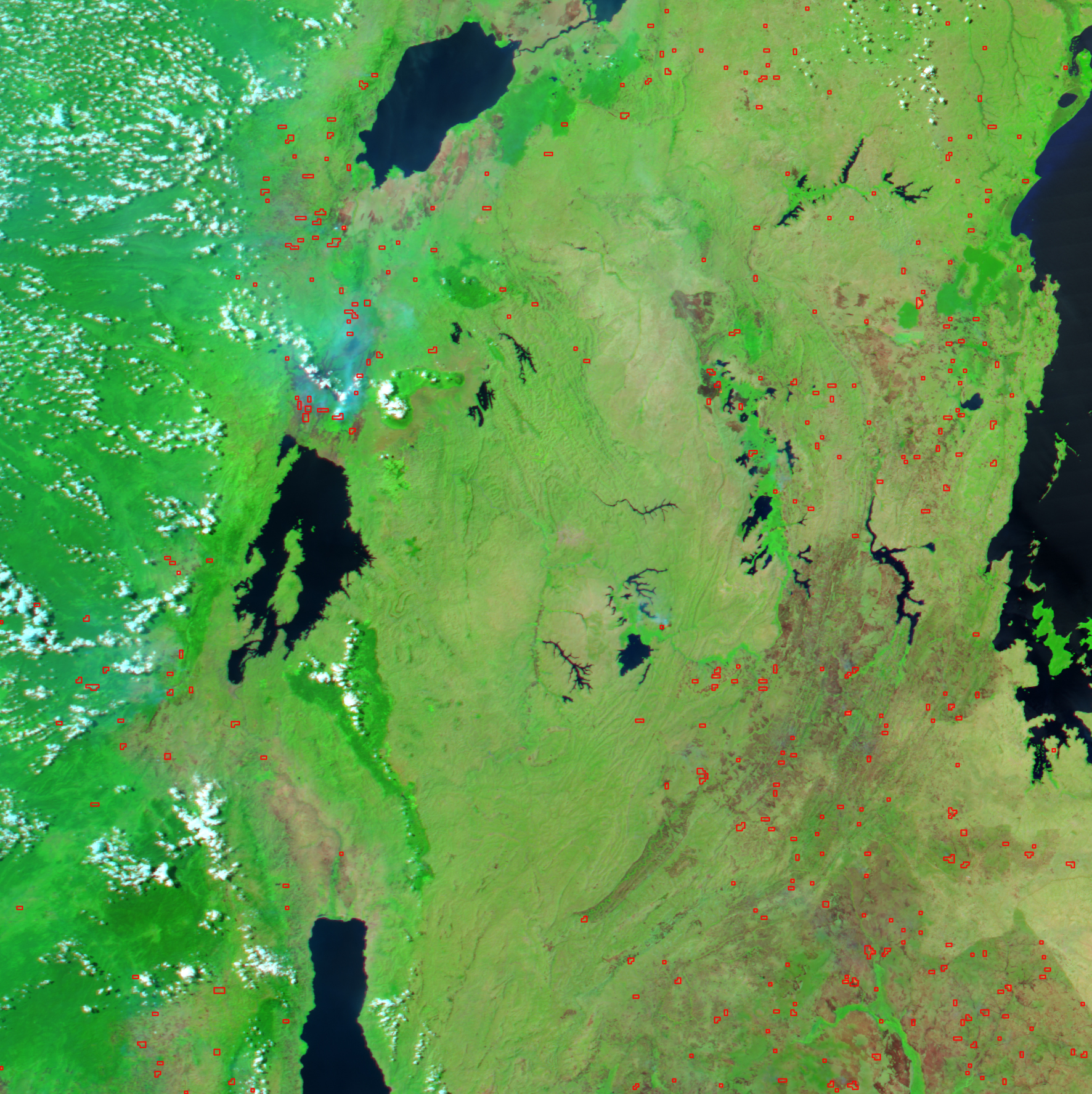
Image of the region between Lake Victoria (on the right) and Lakes Edward, Kivu and Tanganyika (from north to south) showing dense vegetation (bright green) and fires (red)

Some parts of East Africa have been renowned for their concentrations of wild animals, such as the "big five": the elephant, buffalo, lion, black rhinoceros, and leopard, though populations have been declining under increased stress in recent times, particularly those of the rhino and elephant.

The geography of East Africa is often stunning and scenic. Shaped by global plate tectonic forces that have created the East African Rift, East Africa is the site of Mount Kilimanjaro and Mount Kenya, the two tallest peaks in Africa. It also includes the world's second largest freshwater lake, Lake Victoria, and the world's second-deepest lake, Lake Tanganyika.

The unique geography and apparent suitability for farming made East Africa a target for European exploration, exploitation and colonialization in the nineteenth century. Today, tourism is an important part of the economies of Kenya, Tanzania, Seychelles, and Uganda. The easternmost point of the continent, that is Ras Hafun in Somalia, is of archaeological, historical and economical importance.

=== Countries, capitals and largest cities ===
According to the CIA, as of 2017, the countries in the eastern Africa region have a total population of around 537.9 million inhabitants.

Country / Territory	Capital	Largest city by population	Second largest city by population
African Great Lakes
Burundi	Gitega (22,989; 2012 est.)	Bujumbura	Muyinga
Kenya	Nairobi	Nairobi	Mombasa (915,101; 2009 est.)
Rwanda	Kigali	Kigali	Gitarama
Tanzania	Dodoma	Dar es Salaam	Mwanza
Uganda	Kampala (1,507,114; 2014 est.)	Kampala	Gulu
Horn of Africa
Djibouti	Djibouti City (529,000; 2018 est.)	Djibouti City	Ali Sabieh
Eritrea	Asmara	Asmara	Keren
Ethiopia	Addis Ababa	Addis Ababa (2,739,551; 2007 est.)	Dire Dawa
Somalia	Mogadishu (2,572,125)	Mogadishu	Hargeisa
Indian Ocean
Comoros	Moroni	Moroni	Mutsamudu
French Southern Territories	Saint Pierre	Port-aux-Français	–
Madagascar	Antananarivo (1,015,140; 2005 est.)	Antananarivo	Toamasina (326,286)
Mauritius	Port Louis	Port Louis	Beau Bassin-Rose Hill
Mayotte	Mamoudzou	Mamoudzou	Dzaoudzi
Réunion	Saint Denis	Saint Denis	Saint Paul
Seychelles	Victoria	Victoria	Anse Etoile
Northeast Africa
South Sudan	Juba	Juba	Malakal
Southeast Africa
Malawi	Lilongwe (868,800; 2012 est.)	Lilongwe	Blantyre (783,296; 2012 est.)
Mozambique	Maputo	Maputo	Nampula
Zambia	Lusaka	Lusaka	Kitwe
Zimbabwe	Harare	Harare	Bulawayo

=== Climate ===
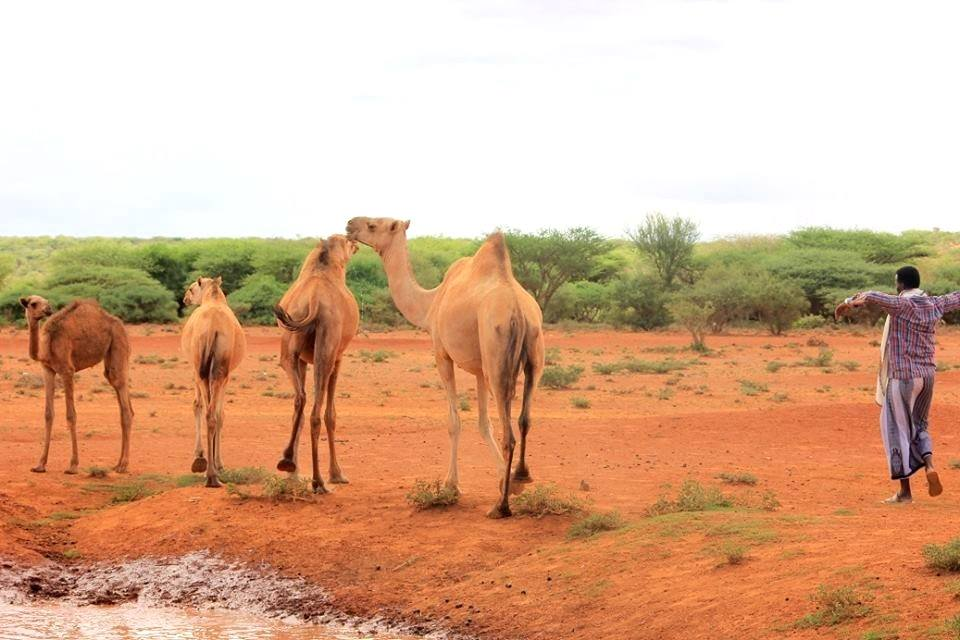
Semi-desert landscape in Somalia

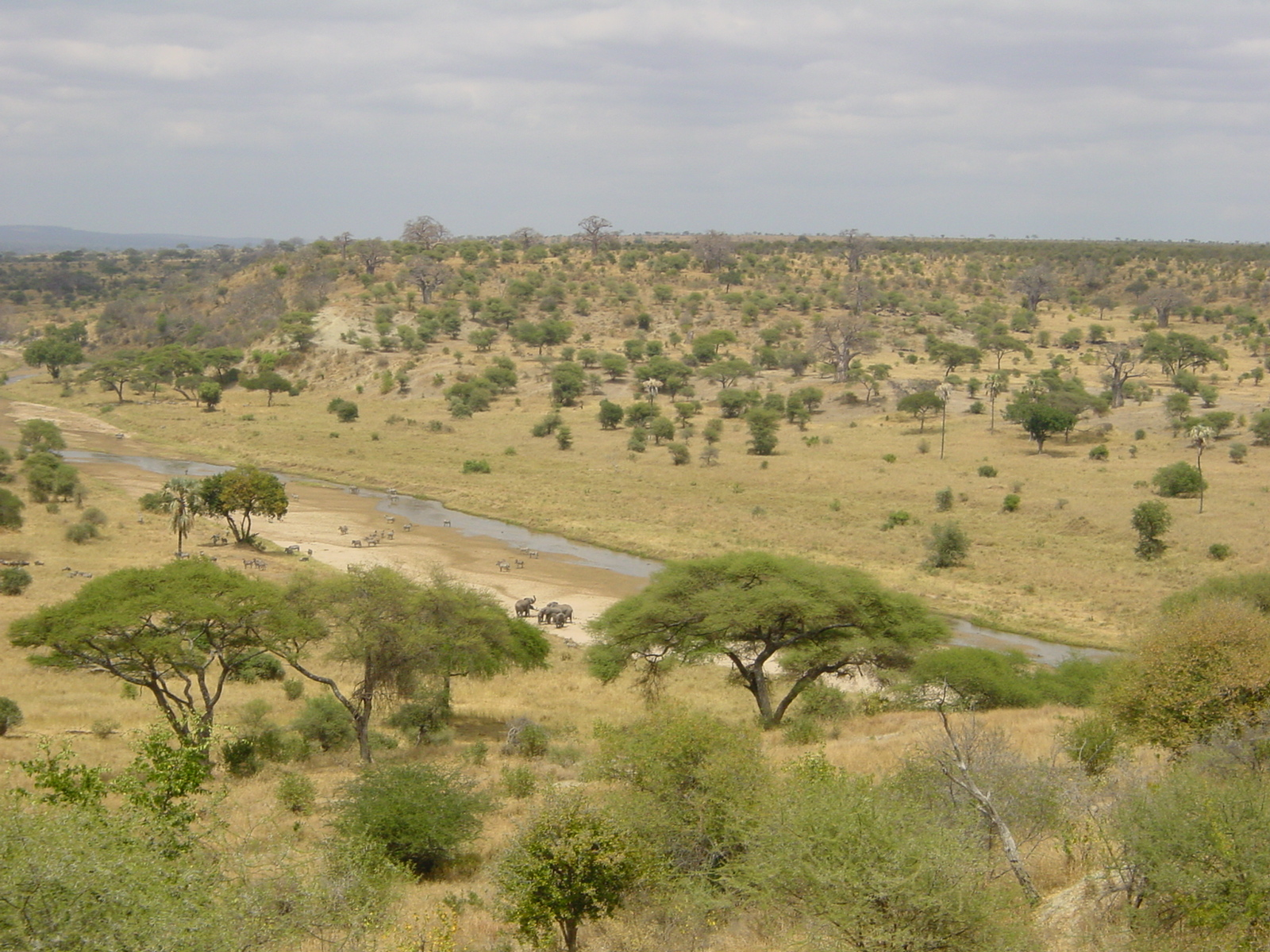
A tree savanna at Tarangire National Park in Tanzania

East Africa has a diverse climate that consists of hot, dry desert regions, cooler regions, and highlands. Its climate generally is rather atypical of equatorial regions, being mostly arid or semi-arid with rainfall totals across much of the lowland regions below 600 millimetres or 24 inches per year. In fact, on the northern coast of Somalia, annual rainfall is less than 100 millimetres or 4 inches and many years can go by without any rain whatsoever. The causes of the low rainfall totals are not fully understood. One factor is presence of the Somali Jet (a fast wind system) in boreal summer, which brings cool southern hemisphere air into East Africa. A second cause is the presence of east to west river valleys in the East African Rift, which channel strong moisture-laden winds from the Indian Ocean away from East Africa and towards the Congo Basin rainforest.

Rainfall generally increases towards the south and with altitude, being around 400 mm (16 in) at Mogadishu and 1,200 mm (47 in) at Mombasa on the coast, whilst inland it increases from around 130 mm (5 in) at Garoowe to over 1,100 mm (43 in) at Moshi near Kilimanjaro. Rainfall in most of East Africa east of the Rwenzoris and Ethiopian Highlands is characterised by two main rainfall seasons, the long rains from March to May and the short rains from October to December. This is usually attributed to the passage of the Intertropical Convergence Zone across the region in those months, but it may also be analogous to the autumn monsoon rains of parts of Sri Lanka, Vietnam, and the Brazilian Nordeste. West of the mountains, the rainfall pattern is more typically tropical, with rain throughout the year near the equator and a single wet season in most of the Ethiopian Highlands from June to September — contracting to July and August around Asmara. Annual rainfall here ranges from over 1,600 mm (63 in) on the western slopes to around 1,250 mm (49 in) at Addis Ababa and 550 mm (22 in) at Asmara. In the high mountains rainfall can be over 2,500 millimetres or 100 inches.

Rainfall variability is influenced by both El Niño events and a positive Indian Ocean Dipole. El Niño events tend to increase rainfall except in the northern and western parts of the Ethiopian and Eritrean highlands, where they produce drought and poor Nile floods. Similarly, a positive Indian Ocean Dipole result in warm sea-surface temperatures off the coast of East Africa and lead to increased rainfall over East Africa. Temperatures in East Africa, except on the hot and generally humid coastal belt, are moderate, with maxima of around 25 °C (77 °F) and minima of 15 °C (59 °F) at an altitude of 1,500 metres (4,921 ft). At altitudes of above 2,500 metres (8,200 ft), frosts are common during the dry season and maxima typically about 21 °C (70 °F) or less.

== Demographics ==
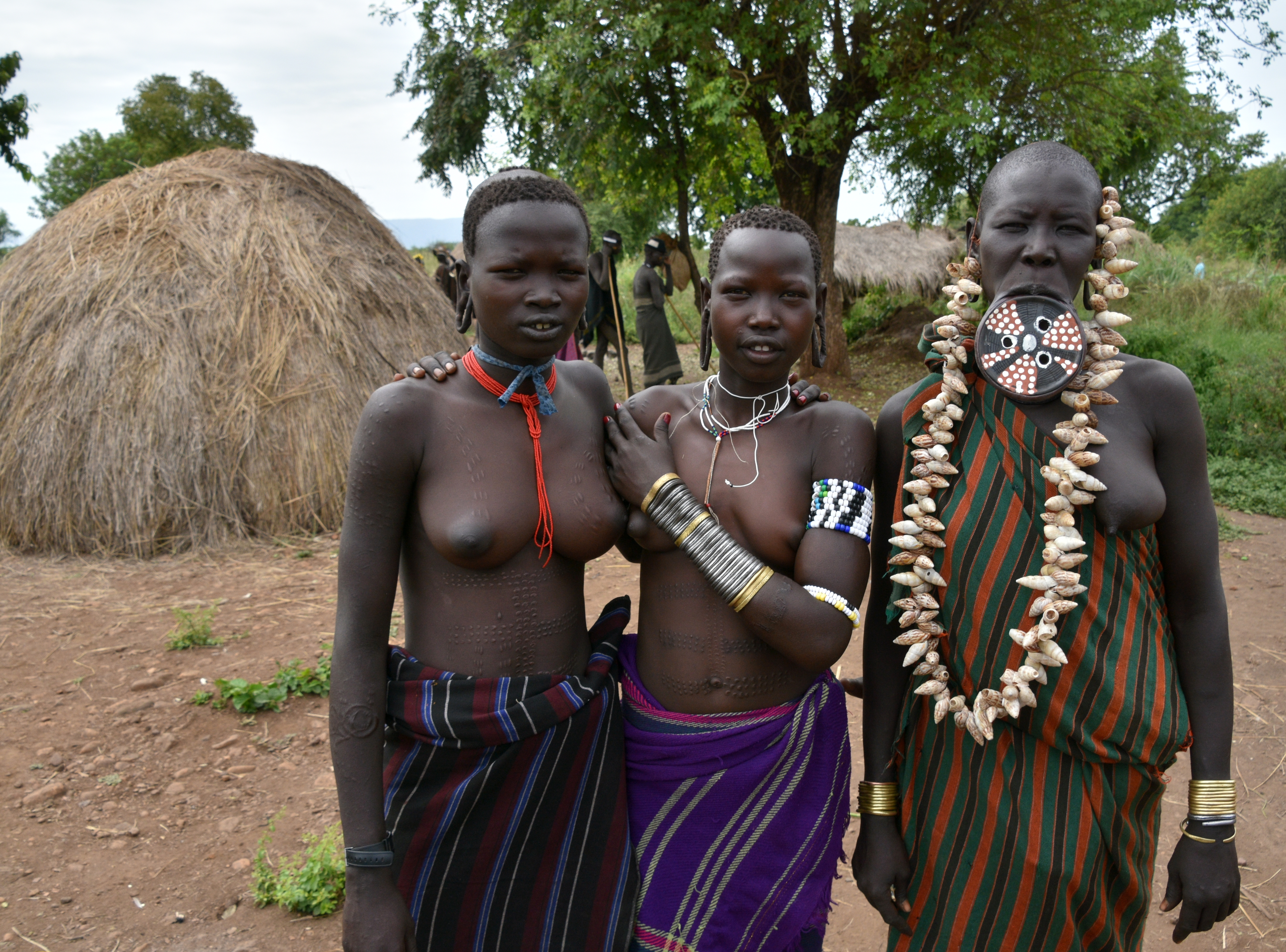
Mursi people in the Southern Nations, Nationalities, and Peoples' Region in Ethiopia

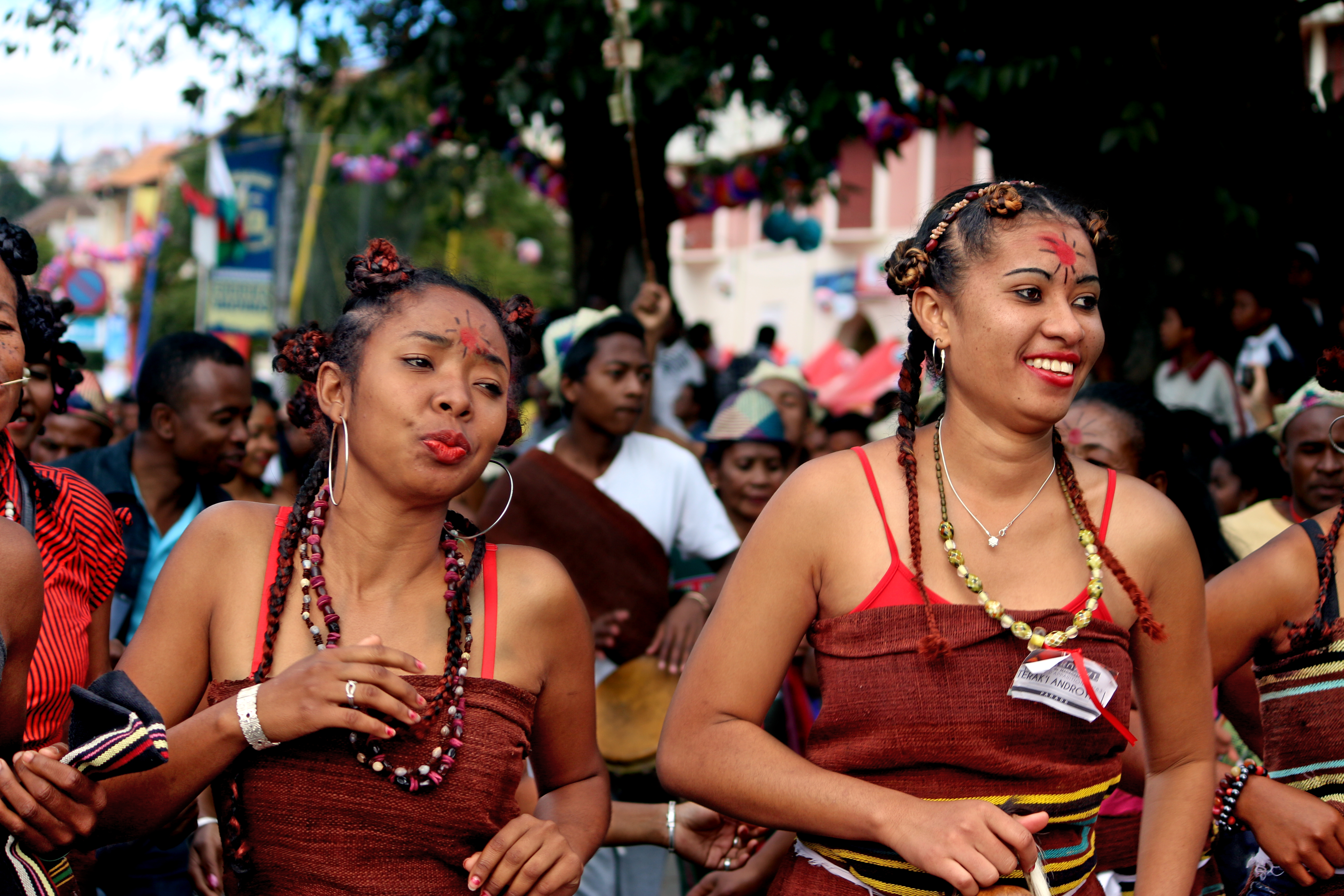
The Malagasy people are an ethnic group indigenous to Madagascar, originating from an admixture of Austronesian and Bantu populations.

Eastern Africa had an estimated population of 260 million in 2000. This was projected to reach 890 million by 2050, with an average growth rate of 2.5% per annum. The 2000 population is expected to quintuple over the course of the 21st century, to 1.6 billion as of 2100 (UN estimates as of 2017). In Ethiopia, there is an estimated population of 102 million as of 2016.

=== Languages ===
Language families, subfamilies and major languages in Africa

In the Horn of Africa and Nile Valley, Afroasiatic languages predominate, including languages of the family's Cushitic (such as Beja, Oromo and Somali), Semitic (such as Amharic, Arabic and Tigrinya), and Omotic (such as Wolaytta) branches.

In the African Great Lakes region, Niger-Congo languages of the Bantu branch are most widely spoken. Among these languages are Kikuyu, Luhya, Kinyarwanda, Kirundi, Kisukuma, Luganda and many others. Swahili, with at least 80 million speakers as a first or second language, is an important trade language in the Great Lakes area. It has official status in Tanzania, Kenya and Uganda.

Nilotic languages, such as Luo, Kalenjin, Maasai and Nuer, are spoken in lesser numbers, primarily in the African Great Lakes and Nile Valley.

Indo-European languages, such as English, French, Portuguese and Italian, remain important in higher institutions in some parts of the larger region.

=== Religion ===
Christianity and Islam are the predominant religions of the region, with traditional African religions and religious syncretism being practiced too. Christianity is the majority religion of the countries in East Africa, with the exception of Comoros, Djibouti and Somalia, where Islam predominates, and Mauritius, where almost half of the population adheres to Hinduism. In Eritrea, the two major religions are Christianity and Islam, although the number of adherents of each faith is uncertain. Among the countries where Christianity is the largest religion, there are sizeable Muslim communities in Ethiopia, and on the Swahili coast in Kenya, Tanzania and Mozambique. In 2020, the Association of Religion Data Archives found that the majority of Eastern Africa was Christian and mostly Protestant.

== Geology ==
=== Tectonic activity ===
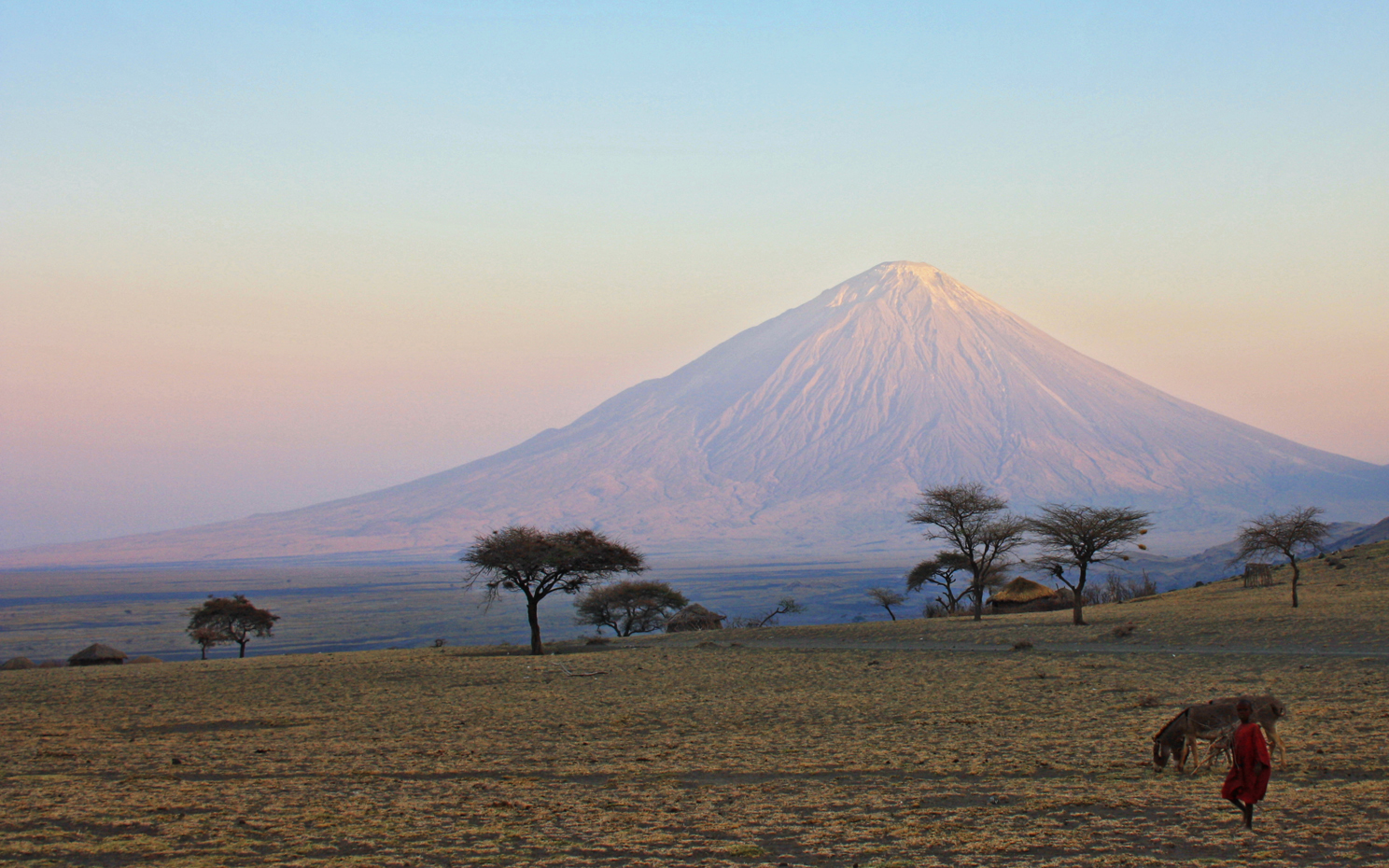
Ol Doinyo Lengai volcano in northern Tanzania

The largest tectonic movement in East Africa is the East African Rift, both the Somali Plate and Nubian Plate are separating at 7mm per annum

== Popular depictions ==
There are movies that have depicted East Africa in various forms. 7 Days in Entebbe, The Last King of Scotland, Out of Africa, Queen of Katwe, The Constant Gardener, Hotel Rwanda, The Good Lie, and Captain Phillips are a few of the critically acclaimed movies. In the video games Halo 2 and Halo 3, East Africa is one of the central locations for the campaigns.

== Economy ==
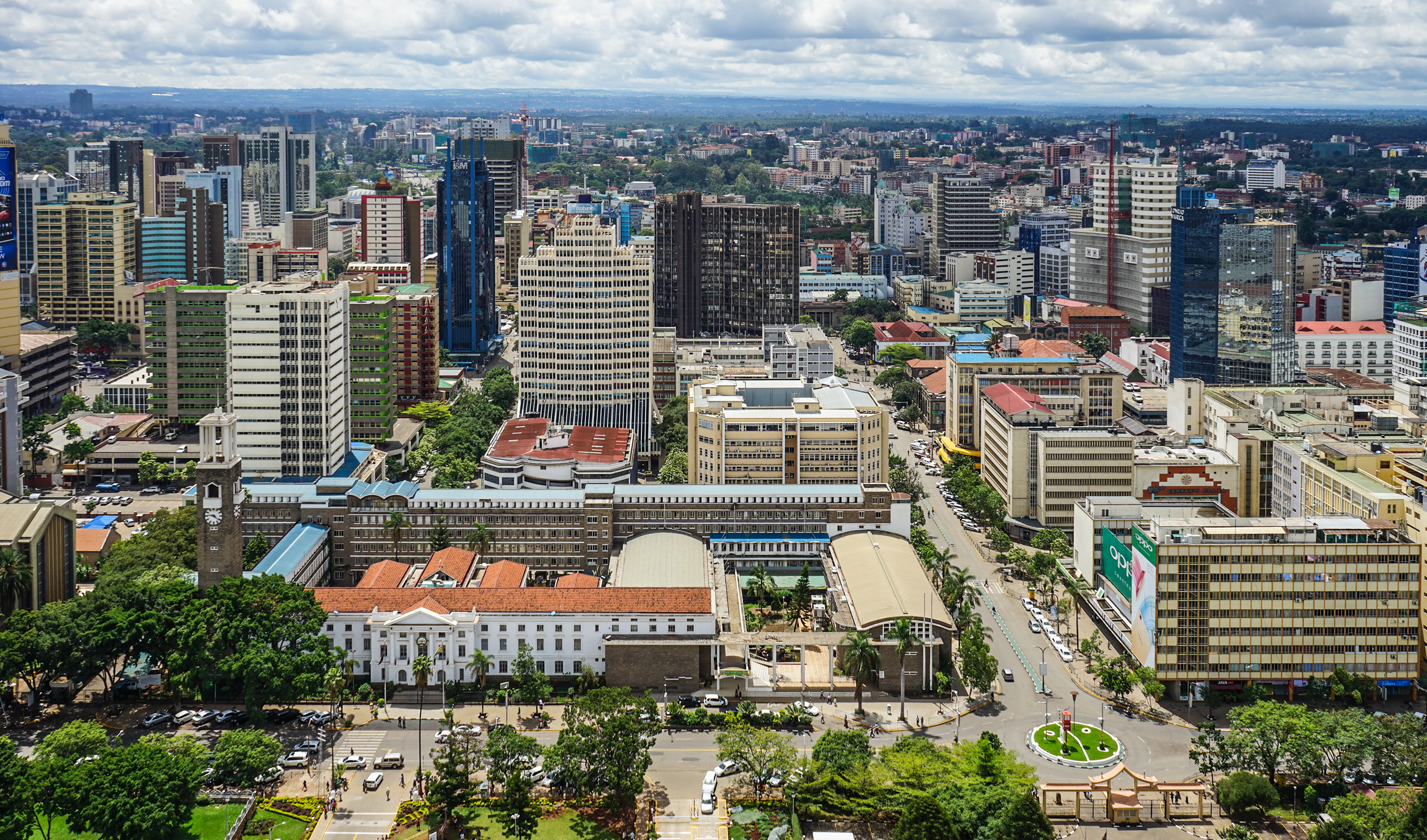
Nairobi is a major financial hub in East Africa.

Agriculture plays a major role in the economy of East Africa, employing the majority of the population and contributing significantly to the GDP. Tourism is especially developed in Tanzania and Kenya, due to safari parks. Nairobi and Addis Ababa are the main financial hubs in East Africa. While East Africa is the fastest growing region in Africa, several countries in the region are struggling economically, with their situation worsened by political instability, such as the economy of South Sudan which stagnated due to the South Sudanese Civil War.

== Culture ==
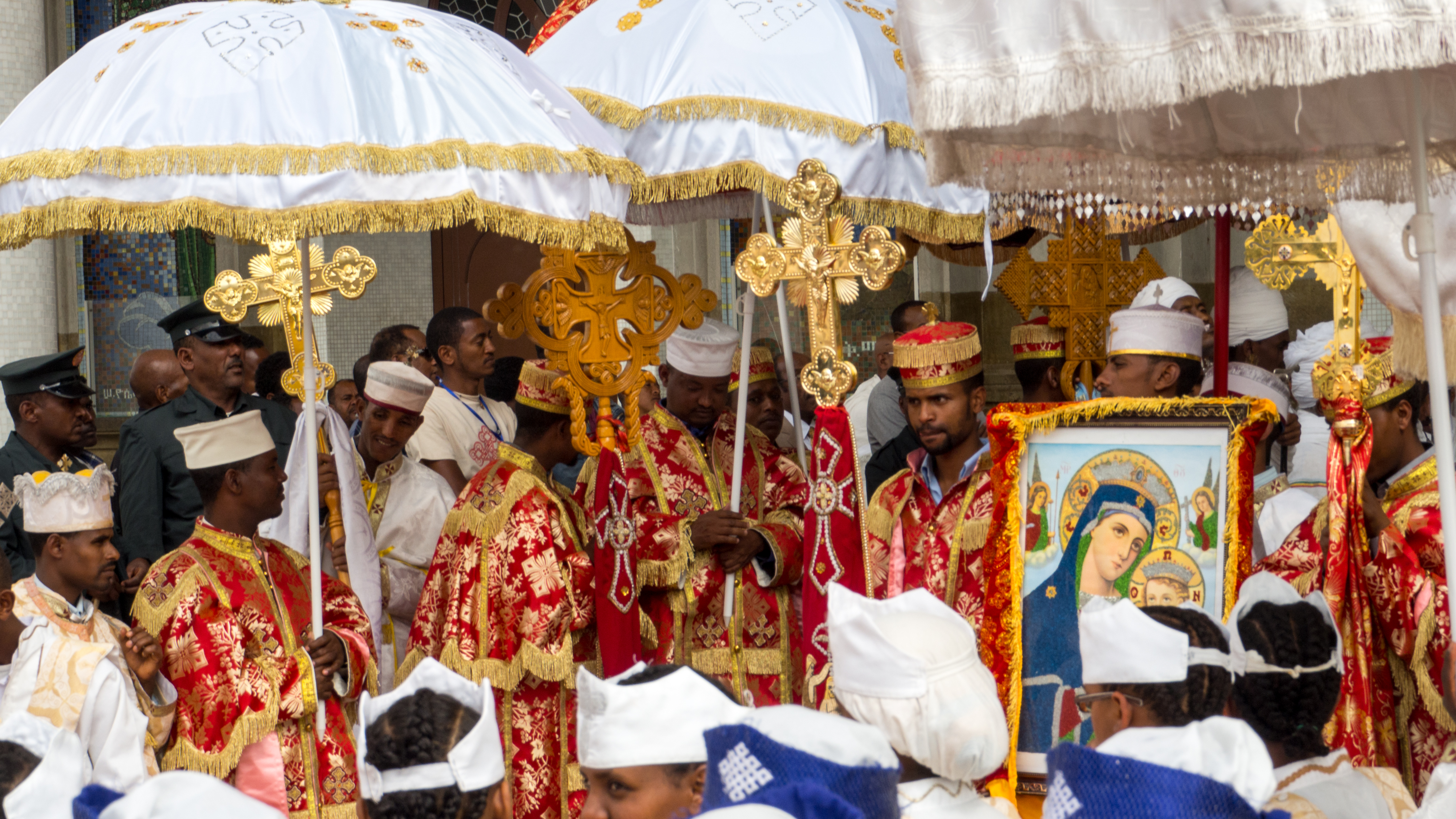
Celebrating Timkat in Ethiopia

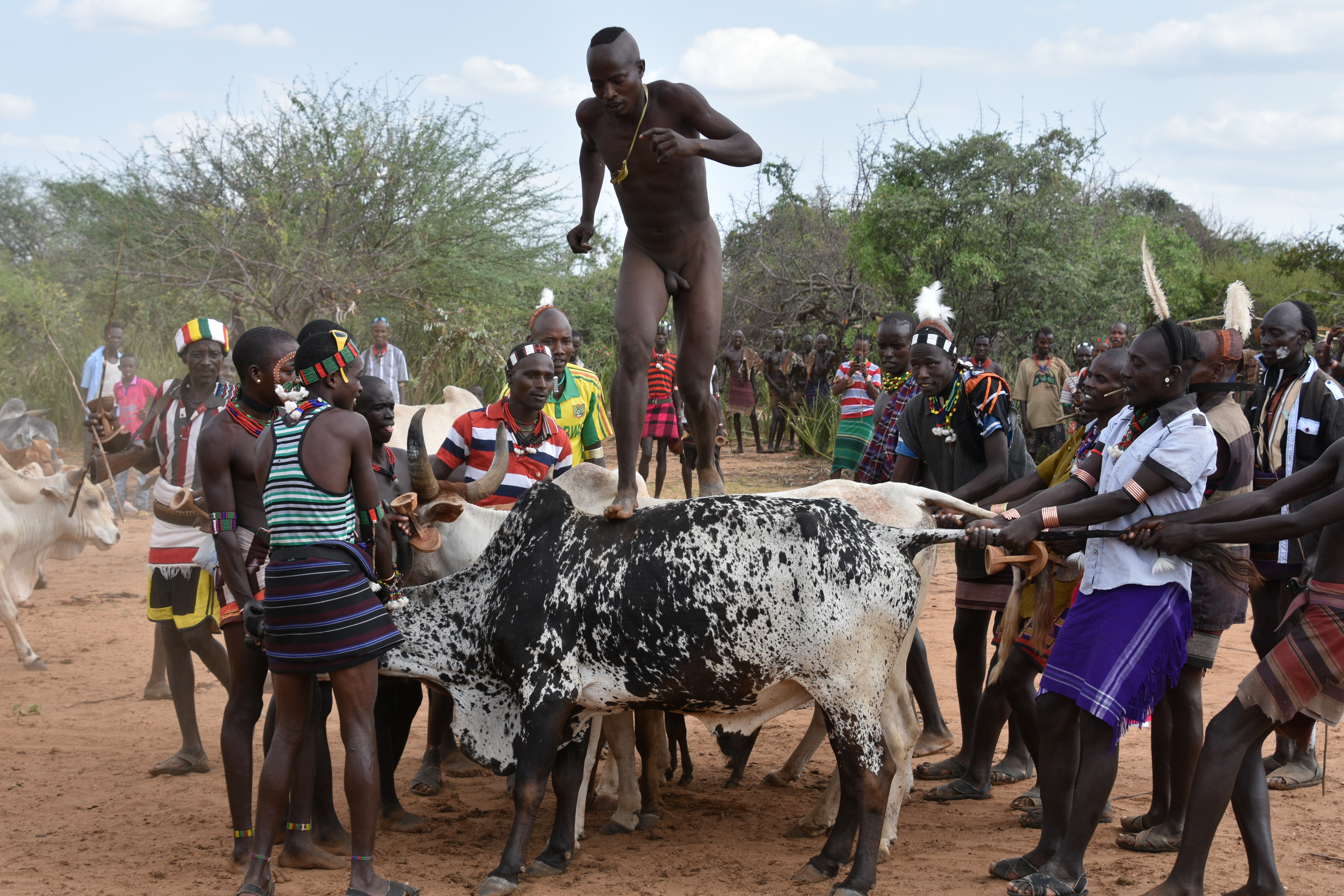
Bull-jumping ceremony among the Hamar people

== See also ==
- African historiography
- Sub-Saharan Africa
- West Africa
- Southern Africa
- Central Africa
- North Africa
- Portuguese conquest of the East African coast
- History of the Jews in East Africa

== Bibliography ==
- Christian Jennings (2005). "Eastern Africa: Regional Survey". In Kevin Shillington (ed.). Encyclopedia of African History. Vol. 1: A–G. New York; London: Fitzroy Dearborn. pp. 378–384?. ISBN 978-1-57958-245-6.
