= Rhapta =

Ancient marketplace

Rhapta (Ancient Greek: τὰ Ῥάπτα and τὰ Ῥαπτά) was an emporion said to be on the coast of Southeast Africa, first described in the 1st century CE. Its location has not been firmly identified, although there are a number of plausible candidate sites. The ancient Periplus of the Erythraean Sea described Rhapta as "the last emporion of Azania", two days' travel south of the Menouthias islands (Chapter 16). The Periplus also states that the city and port were ruled by South Arabian vassals of the Himyarite kingdom, particularly a certain "Mapharitic chieftain."

According to Claudius Ptolemy, Diogenes, a merchant in the Indian trade, was blown off course from his usual route from India, and after travelling 25 days south along the coast of Africa arrived at Rhapta, located where the river of the same name enters the Indian Ocean opposite the island of Menouthias. Diogenes further describes this river as having its source near the Mountains of the Moon, near the swamp whence the Nile was said to also have its source. Ptolemy also mentions another Greek captain, called Theophilos, who took twenty days to travel from the Horn of Africa to Rhapta.

Rhapta is also mentioned by Stephanus of Byzantium and Cosmas Indicopleustes.

Stephanus of Byzantium and Ptolemy write that Rhapta was a metropolis of Barbaria (Ancient Greek: Βαρβαρίας).

According to Huntingford, it is certain that the people of Rhapta did not speak a Bantu language, since the 1st century AD is too early for Bantu speakers to have reached the East African coast. It is possible that the survivors of the 1st century inhabitants are the Iraqw, Gorowa, Alagwa and Burungi. Roland Anthony Oliver states that there is no evidence where Greco-Roman sources allude to the inhabitants of Rhapta being of Bantu origin.

== Name ==
It was named Rhapta (meaning sewn in Greek), due to the sewed boats (ῥαπτῶν πλοιαρίων) which were used there.

== Location ==
G.W.B. Huntingford lists five proposed locations for Rhapta:

- Tanga, at the mouth of the Mkulumuzi and Sigi Rivers
- Pangani, at the mouth of the Ruvu River
- Msasani, three miles north of Dar es Salaam—or Dar es Salaam itself
- Kisuyu
- Somewhere in the Rufiji River delta, opposite Mafia Island.

Huntingford dismisses the first two as being too close to Zanzibar and Pemba islands (which he identifies with Menouthis, and follows the author of the Periplus in locating Menouthis north of Rhapta). He observes that there is no river at Msasani, and thus concludes Kisuyu or the Rufiji delta are the most likely candidates. However, J. Innes Miller points out that Roman coins have been found on Pemba; that the Ruvu emerges near the Kilimanjaro and Meru mountains—which confirm the account of Diogenes; and that an old inscription in Semitic characters has been found near the Pangani estuary, which make Pemba a likely candidate for Rhapta. However, the first evidence of inhabitation starts solely in the seventh century at a site called Tumbe on the northern end of the island, limpidly contradicting these assertions. Furthermore, John Perkins states this: "Some Roman, Byzantine, and Sasanian coins are reported from the East African coast; however, none of these come from excavations, and the surrounding evidence suggests that they probably did not reach the Swahili Coast in antiquity. Evidence for contacts and trade between this part of Africa and the Roman and Persian worlds is mainly recorded in the limited written records."

In recent years, professor Felix Chami has found archaeological evidence for extensive Roman trade on Mafia Island and, not far away, on the mainland, near the mouth of the Rufiji River, which he dated to the first few centuries CE.

== Goods ==
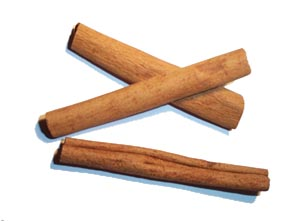
Cinnamon sticks.

Which goods were traded at Rhapta is disputed. The Periplus only states that it was a source of ivory and tortoise shell. J. Innes Miller argues that Rhapta formed an important link in the trade route between what is now modern Indonesia and consumers in the Mediterranean region. Miller notes that ancient authorities, e.g. Herodotus (3.111) state that cinnamon and cassia bark were harvested in Africa, yet these species until recently were found only in Southeast Asia, which would hint at some conflation. Miller points to the well-documented cultural links between Indonesia and East Africa (e.g., the Malagasy language is related to Malay, both people use double outrigger canoes). He then posits that the use of monsoons began far earlier than previously thought, allowing traders to bring their spices westward perhaps as early as the 2nd millennium BC.

It is possible that both the account of the Periplus and at least part of Miller's theory are correct, for the Periplus focuses on the availability of tortoise shell, and its silence about other goods should not be taken as evidence that other goods were not traded.

== See also ==
- Azania
- Menouthias

== Bibliography ==
- Casson, Lionel. 1989. The Periplus Maris Erythraei. (Translation by H. Frisk, 1927, with some updates and improvements). Princeton, Princeton University Press. (This is considered by some the most accurate translation of the Periplus into English, and also includes the Greek text.)
- Chami, F. A. 1999. "The Early Iron Age on Mafia island and its relationship with the mainland." Azania, 34, pp. 1–10.
- Chami, Felix A. 2002. "The Graeco-Romans and Paanchea/Azania: sailing in the Erythraean Sea" in Red Sea Trade and Travel. Presented Sunday 6 October 2002 at the British Museum. Organised by The Society for Arabian Studies.
- Hill, John E. 2004. The Peoples of the West from the Weilue 魏略 by Yu Huan 魚豢: A Third Century Chinese Account Composed between 239 and 265 CE. Draft annotated English translation. See especially Section 15 on Zesan = Azania and notes.
- Huntingford, G. W. B. 1980. Periplus of the Erythraean Sea. London: the Hakluyt Society.
- Miller, J. Innes. 1969. Chapter 8: "The Cinnamon Route". In: The Spice Trade of the Roman Empire. Oxford: University Press. ISBN 0-19-814264-1
- Ray, Himanshu Prabha, ed. 1999. Archaeology of Seafaring: The Indian Ocean in the Ancient Period. Pragati Publications, Delhi.
- Schoff, Wilfred H. 1912. The Periplus of the Erythræan Sea. New York, Longmans, Green, and Co. Second Edition. Reprint, New Delhi, Oriental Books Reprint Corporation. 1974.
