= Azania =

Region of Africa

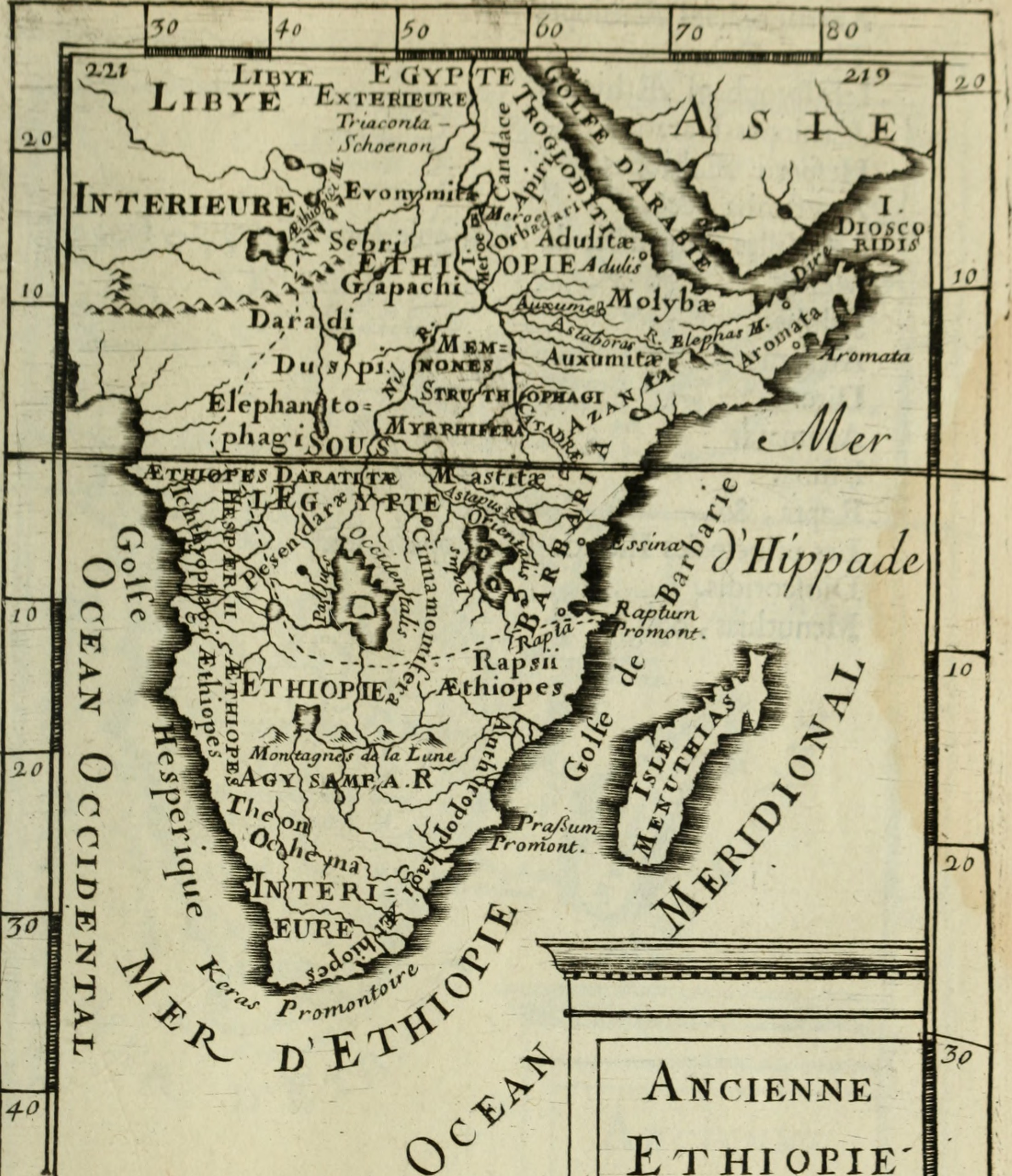
Map of Africa, Description de l'univers (1683); A'zania is circled.

Azania (Ancient Greek: Ἀζανία) is a name that has been applied to various parts of southeastern tropical Africa. In the Roman period and perhaps earlier, the toponym has been hypothesised to have referred to a portion of the Southeast African coast extending from southern Somalia to the border between Mozambique and South Africa. During classical antiquity, Azania was mostly inhabited by Southern Cushitic peoples, whose groups would rule the area until the great Bantu Migration.

In 1933, G.W.B Huntingford proposed a theory of Azanian civilization existing in Kenya and northern Tanzania, between the Stone Age and Islamic period. It was supposed that these people were from Somalia where they eventually perished around the 14th to 15th-century.

== Ancient Azania ==
Azania was a region in ancient Arcadia, which was according to Pausanias named after the mythical king Azan. According to Herodotus, the region contained the ancient town of Paus. The use of this name coincides with a reference in which Pliny the Elder mentions an "Azanian Sea" (N.H. 6.34) that began around the emporium of Adulis and stretched around the south coast of Africa. It may well be that the Greek usage resonated with a term already in use around the Horn of Africa especially in the light of the fact that the term with a different meaning to the Greek Arcadian meaning, was in use in South Asia, Southeast Asia and China, Or perhaps the word Azania is borrowed from the Arabic word Ajamiya or Ajami via the Greek word Ἀζανία. The Greek Travelogue is unlikely to reflect navigation of the African East Coast. The 1st century AD Greek travelogue the Periplus of the Erythraean Sea first describes Azania based on its author's intimate knowledge of the area. According to the Periplus, traded items included awls, knives, glass, and iron implements, although this does not suggest the "Azanians" were unaware of iron smelting. Chapter 15 of the Periplus suggests that Azania could be the littoral area south of present-day Somalia (the "Lesser and Greater Bluffs", the "Lesser and Greater Strands", and the "Seven Courses"). Chapter sixteen describes the emporium of Rhapta, located south of the Puralean Islands at the end of the Seven Courses of Azania, as the "southernmost market of Azania". The Periplus does not mention any dark-skinned "Ethiopians" among the area's inhabitants. They only later appear in Ptolemy's Geographia, but in a region far south, around the "Bantu nucleus" of northern Mozambique. According to John Donnelly Fage, these early Greek documents altogether suggest that the original inhabitants of the Azania coast, the "Azanians", were of the same ancestral stock as the Afro-Asiatic populations to the north of them along the Red Sea. The "Azanians" made extensive use of small sewn boats, which were used to fish and hunt. The Periplus's description of the "Azanians" is brief, merely characterizing them as "Dark-skinned" and "Of great stature". Subsequently, by the 10th century AD, these original "Azanians" had been replaced by early waves of Bantu settlers.

Later Western writers who mention Azania include Claudius Ptolemy (c. 100 – c. 170 CE) and Cosmas Indicopleustes (6th century CE).

== Revival ==
The term was briefly revived in the second half of the 20th century as the appellation given to South Africa by African nationalists such as the Pan Africanist Congress of Azania (PAC) party. In 2025, the African Transformation Movement (ATM) proposed changing the name of the Republic of South Africa to the Republic of Azania. Political analyst Kenneth Mokgatlhe has criticised the proposal.

It has also been applied to the regional state of Jubaland within Somalia.

== See also ==
- Menouthias
- Rhapta
- Zanj Coast

== Bibliography ==
- Casson, Lionel (1989). The Periplus Maris Erythraei. Lionel Casson. (Translation by H. Frisk, 1927, with updates and improvements and detailed notes). Princeton, Princeton University Press.
- Chami, F. A. (1999). "The Early Iron Age on Mafia island and its relationship with the mainland." Azania Vol. XXXIV 1999, pp. 1–10.
- Chami, Felix A. 2002. "The Egypto-Graeco-Romans and Paanchea/Azania: sailing in the Erythraean Sea." From: Red Sea Trade and Travel. The British Museum. Sunday 6 October 2002. Organised by The Society for Arabian Studies.[www.thebritishmuseum.ac.uk/ane/fullpapers.doc]
- Collins, Alan S.; Pisarevsky, Sergei A. (2005). "Amalgamating eastern Gondwana: The evolution of the Circum-Indian Orogens". Earth-Science Reviews. 71 (3–4): 229–270. Bibcode:2005ESRv...71..229C. doi:10.1016/j.earscirev.2005.02.004.
- Huntingford, G.W.B. (trans. & ed.). Periplus of the Erythraean Sea. Hakluyt Society. London, 1980.
- Yu Huan, The Weilue in The Peoples of the West, translation by John E. Hill
  - "Weilue: The Peoples of the West". Depts.washington.edu. 23 May 2004.
