= Menouthias =

Menouthias (Ancient Greek: Μενουθιάς) is an ancient trading town most commonly identified with either Madagascar, Pemba Island, Mafia Island or Zanzibar in Tanzania or East Africa, that existed from at least 50 B.C. Along with Rhapta and Azania, the settlement is mentioned in early Greek writings, such as the Periplus of the Erythraean Sea, which describes Rhapta as "the last marketplace of Azania", two days' travel south of the Menouthias islands.

== See also ==
- Azania
- Rhapta
