= Southeast Africa =

Geographic region

Map of Southeast Africa

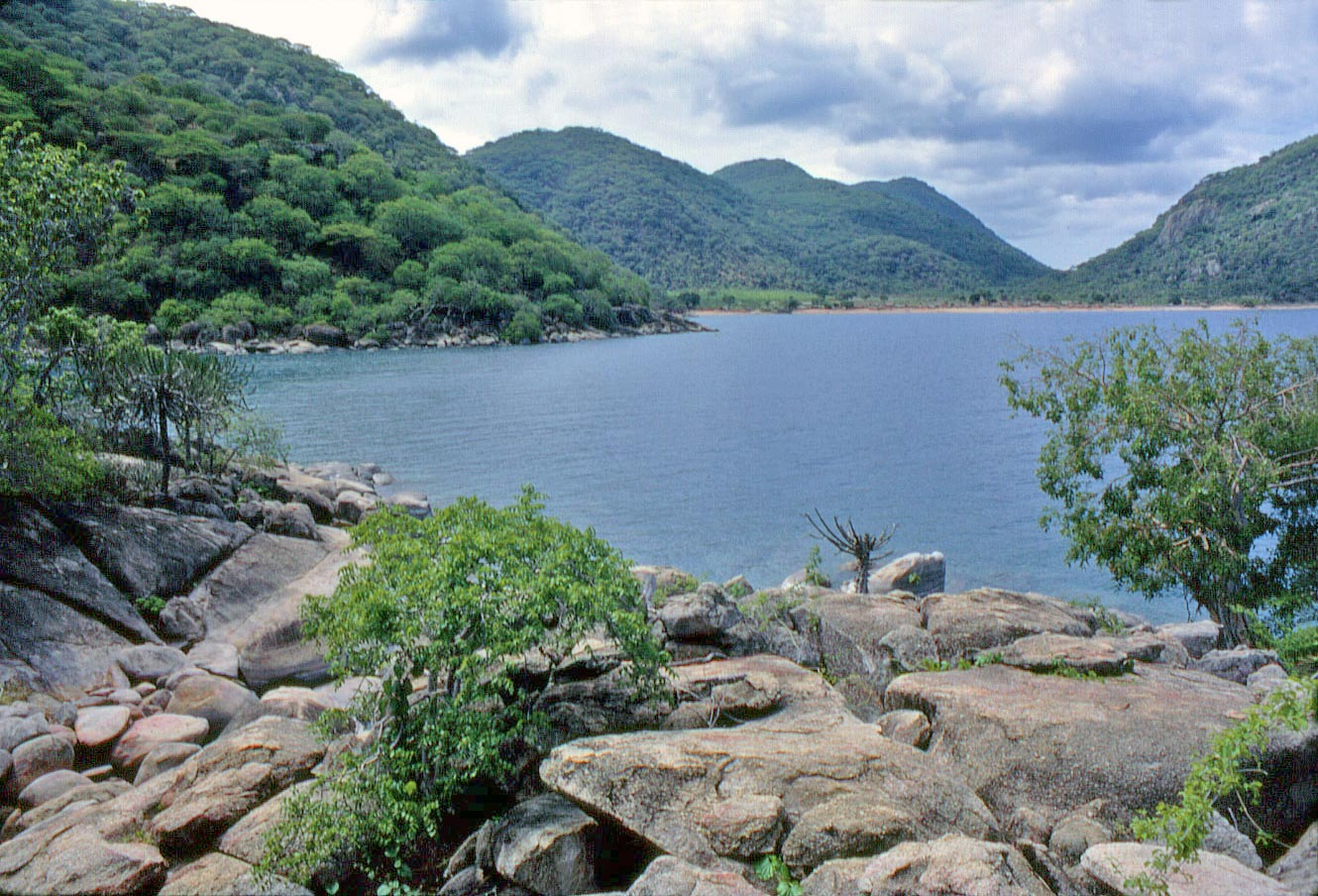
Lake Malawi in 1967

Southeast Africa, or Southeastern Africa, (Note: Though this reference includes Namibia, it was previously referred to as "Southwest Africa" due to its location.) is an African region that is intermediate between East Africa (Note: East Africa at least partially includes Northeast Africa.) and Southern Africa. (Note: Southern Africa includes what was known as Southwest Africa.) It comprises the countries Burundi, Botswana, Eswatini, Kenya, Malawi, Mozambique, Namibia, Rwanda, Tanzania, Uganda, Zambia, Zimbabwe, and sometimes Somalia in the mainland, with the island-nations of Madagascar, Mauritius, Comoros, and Seychelles also sometimes included.

== History ==
=== Prehistory ===
East and southern Africa are among the earliest regions where modern humans (Homo sapiens) and their predecessors are believed to have lived. In September 2019, scientists reported the computerized determination, based on 260 CT scans, of a virtual skull shape of the last common human ancestor to modern humans/H. sapiens, representative of the earliest modern humans, and suggested that modern humans arose between 350,000 and 260,000 years ago through a merging of populations in South and East Africa.

=== Bantu expansion ===
Bantu-speakers traversed from Central Africa into Southeast Africa approximately 3,000 years ago.

=== Modern history ===
In the 19th and 20th centuries, David Livingstone and Frederick Courtney Selous visited Southeast Africa. The latter wrote down his experiences in the book Travel and Adventure in South-East Africa.

== Demographics and languages ==
People include the San people. The Swahili language is spoken, both as an official language and lingua franca, by millions of people.

== Geography ==
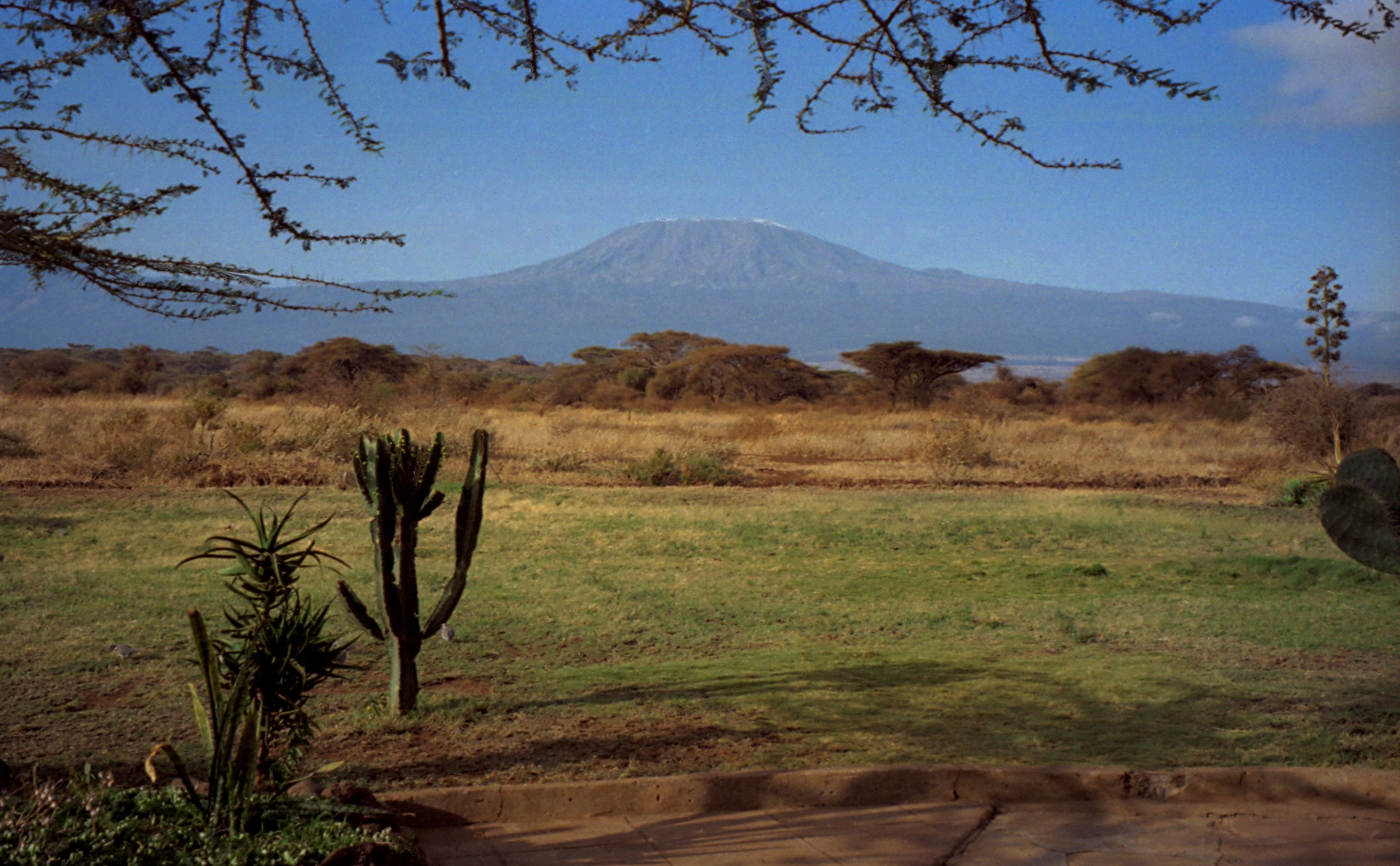
Mount Kilimanjaro, Africa's highest mountain

Lake Malawi and Limpopo River are located in Southeast Africa.

== Wildlife ==
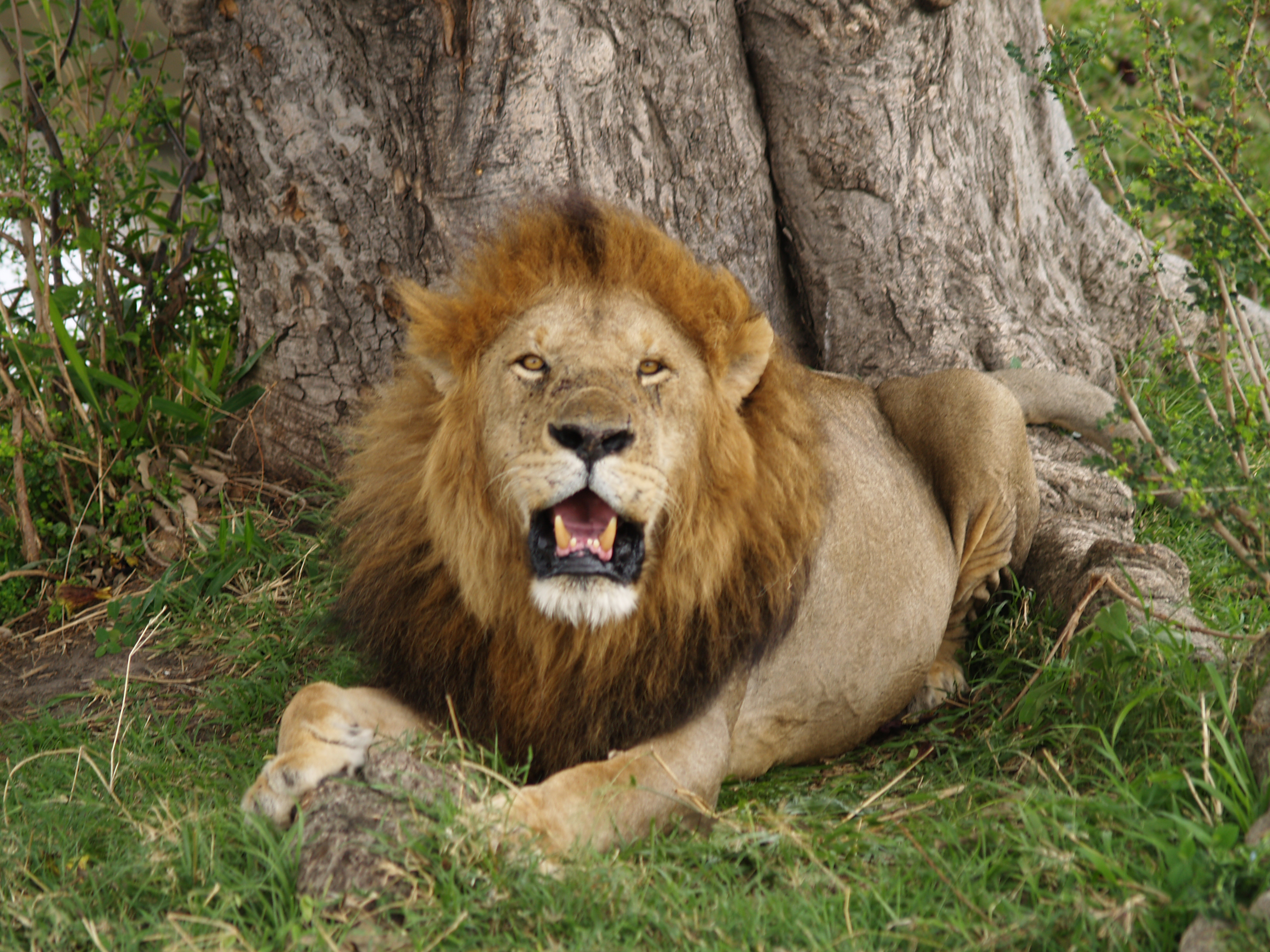
Lion in Masai Mara, Kenya

Fauna includes the cheetah, leopard, lion, Nile crocodile, hyena, Lichtenstein's hartebeest and white rhinoceros.

== See also ==
- Mozambique Channel
- Sub-Saharan Africa
