= Watcher in the Water =

Fictional creature in J.R.R. Tolkien's Middle-earth

- Middle-earth character
- Book illustration by John Howe

In-universe information
- Race: Unknown
- Book(s): The Fellowship of the Ring (1954); The Return of the Shadow (1988); The Treason of Isengard (1989)

The Watcher in the Water is a fictional creature in J. R. R. Tolkien's Middle-earth; it appears in The Fellowship of the Ring, the first volume of The Lord of the Rings. (Note: The Fellowship of the Ring, book 2, ch. 4 "A Journey in the Dark") Lurking in a lake beneath the western walls of the dwarf-realm Moria, it is said to have appeared after the damming of the river Sirannon, and its presence was first recorded by Balin's dwarf company 30 or so years before the beginning of The Fellowship of the Ring.

The origins of the Watcher in the Water are not described in Tolkien's works, but critics have compared it to the legendary kraken and to Odysseus's passage between the devouring Scylla and the whirlpool Charybdis. Its presence in combination with the barrier lake and the formidable Doors of Durin have been likened to the multiple obstacles often found in Norse mythology.

== Literature ==
In The Lord of the Rings, the Fellowship of the Ring are on a quest to Mount Doom to destroy the One Ring made by the Dark Lord Sauron. During their journey, they face two evil choices to cross the Misty Mountains: over the mountain of Caradhras through the Redhorn Gate pass, or through Moria, a dark labyrinth of tunnels and pits. They first try the mountain pass, but the weather proves too severe, and the Fellowship turn back and approach Moria's West Gate, beside which the Watcher lived in a lake. It is said to have appeared after the damming of the local river Sirannon, and its presence was first recorded by Balin's dwarf company 30 or so years before the beginning of The Fellowship of the Ring. When the party approaches the Gate, the Watcher seizes Frodo Baggins with a long, pale-green, luminous, fingered tentacle, succeeded by twenty more. The Company rescue Frodo and retreat into Moria, and the Watcher seals the Doors of the West Gate shut. As Gandalf commented, "Something has crept or been driven out of the dark water under the mountains. There are older and fouler things than orcs in the deep places of the world." He privately notes that the creature reached for Frodo, the Ring-bearer, first out of all the members of the company.

Later, the Fellowship find the Book of Mazarbul, a record of Balin's failed expedition of Dwarves to reclaim Moria. (Note: The Fellowship of the Ring, book 2, ch. 5 "The Bridge of Khazad-dûm") In the last pages of the book, the scribe, revealed to be Ori, relates: "We cannot get out. We cannot get out. They [the Orcs] have taken the Bridge and second hall. ... the pool is up to the wall at Westgate. The Watcher in the Water took Óin. We cannot get out. The end comes ... drums, drums in the deep ... they are coming."

== Concept and creation ==
The "Watcher in the Water", or just "the Watcher", is the only name Tolkien gave to this creature.

An early version of the Fellowship's encounter with the Watcher is found in The Return of the Shadow. Tolkien's account of the creature at this stage is practically the same as in the final published version. Its emergence, physical appearance, abilities, attack on the Fellowship, and the breaking of the Moria Gate are already present in his initial writings. (Note: The Return of the Shadow, ch. 25 "The Mines of Moria")

== Analysis ==
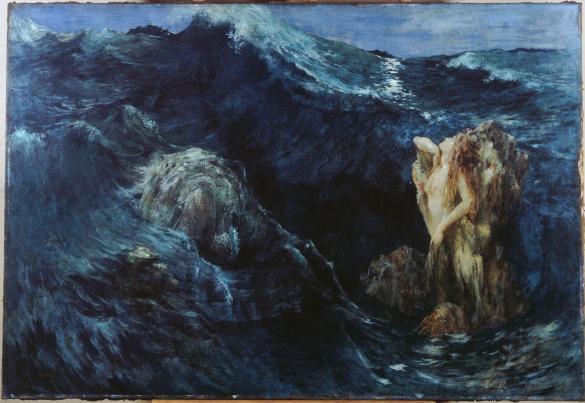
Gateway to Hell: the Fellowship's passage past the Watcher in the Water and through Moria's Doors of Durin has been compared to Odysseus's passage between the devouring Scylla and the whirlpool Charybdis. Painting by Ary Renan, 1894

In The Complete Tolkien Companion, J. E. A. Tyler suggests that the Watcher was a cold-drake: "these dragons rely on their strength and speed alone (the creature that attacked the Ring-bearer near the Lake of Moria may have been one of these)".

The essayist Allison Harl writes that the Watcher may be a kraken created and bred by Morgoth in Utumno, and that it represents a gatekeeper whose goal, in the context of the archetypal journey, is to keep the heroes from entering into new territory, psychologically or spiritually. This "guardian theory" has been echoed by writers such as Joseph Campbell.

The scholar of English literature Charles A. Huttar suggests possible origins for the Watcher in the Classical world. He compares the combination of the tentacled monster and the "clashing gate" when the Fellowship pass through the Doors of Durin, only to have the Watcher smash the rocks behind them, to Greek mythology's Wandering Rocks near the opening of the underworld, and to Odysseus's passage between the devouring Scylla and the whirlpool Charybdis.

Charles Huttar's comparison with perilous passages in Classical mythology
	Tolkien The Lord of the Rings	Apollonius Rhodius Argonautica	Homer Odyssey
Company	Company of the Ring	Jason and the Argonauts	Odysseus and his crew
Perils	Watcher in the Water, Doors of Durin	Wandering Rocks	Scylla and Charybdis
Actions	Watcher smashes the Doors behind them	Rocks threaten to crush ships	Scylla tries to devour travellers; whirlpool Charybdis threatens to sink ship

The scholar Jonathan Evans describes the monster as "the vague Watcher in the Water" and "a many-tentacled creature". He notes Gandalf's description, and compares this with Gandalf's later statement that "the world is gnawed by nameless things" in Moria's deepest places, older even than Sauron "and unknown even to him".

Marjorie Burns, a scholar of English literature, situates the Watcher in the Water as part of a triple obstacle to entering Moria: "ominous obstructing waters, the Watcher within, and highly resistant doors". She comments that such a "piling up of opposition" is characteristic of Norse mythology, in which it is common for there to be massive obstacles, unwelcoming gates, aggressive dogs and "persistent guardians".

Norbert Schürer writes in Mythlore that Tolkien effectively describes the state of the water, the nature of the Watcher, and the situation of the Company of the Ring on their dangerous quest all at once, the aquatic environment "symbolically represent[ing]" the difficulty of the choice to be made.

Norbert Schürer's analysis of symbolism before the gates of Moria
Water body	Description	Interpretation	The decision to be made
Sirannon stream	previously "flowed", "strong and full"; now "a trickle"	as if it has "intent"	The choice is not easy; the Company may hope for a flowing journey, or get mired in dark dirty water
Pool	"sullen", "ominous"	as if it has "agency"	The choice is not easy; the Company may hope for a flowing journey, or get mired in dark dirty water
Creek	"green and stagnant [with a] slimy arm", "dark", "unclean"	as if it was a living body	The choice is not easy; the Company may hope for a flowing journey, or get mired in dark dirty water
Disturbed water	"seething", "pale-green and luminous and wet"	"the awakening of the beast"	The choice is not easy; the Company may hope for a flowing journey, or get mired in dark dirty water

== Adaptations ==
The Watcher in the Water in Peter Jackson's The Fellowship of the Ring

The Watcher in the Water appears in Peter Jackson's The Fellowship of the Ring (2001). In Jackson's adaptation, the Watcher is portrayed as a colossal, octopus-like monster. Jackson stated in the commentaries that the original idea was to have the Watcher drag Bill the pony, who was carrying the party's baggage, underwater. In the concept art gallery feature on the DVD, the artists John Howe and Alan Lee explain that the Watcher was one of the most difficult creatures to design as Tolkien had written so little about it.

The Lord of the Rings Strategy Battle Game by Games Workshop, based on Jackson's film, calls the Watcher in the Water the "Guardian of the Doors of Durin".
