= The Lord of the Rings: Aragorn's Quest =

2010 video game

- Developers: TT Fusion; Headstrong Games (Wii)
- Publisher: Warner Bros. Interactive Entertainment
- Director: Tancred Dyke-Wells
- Producer: Sai Wun Poon
- Designer: Tancred Dyke-Wells
- Programmer: Duncan Ross
- Artist: Jason Howard
- Writer: Justin Cheadle
- Composer: James Hannigan
- Platforms: Wii, Nintendo DS, PlayStation 2, PlayStation 3, PlayStation Portable
- Release: NA: 14 September 2010; NA: 15 September 2010 (PSP); EU: 29 October 2010; AS: 17 September 2010 (PS3)
- Genres: Action-adventure (Wii and PS3); Action role-playing (PS2 and handhelds)
- Modes: Single-player, multiplayer (Wii and PS3)

The Lord of the Rings: Aragorn's Quest is an action-adventure video game released in 2010 by WB Games on various Nintendo and Sony platforms, with Headstrong Games developing a Wii version and TT Fusion developing the game on other platforms.

The game is an adaptation of Peter Jackson's Lord of the Rings film trilogy; The Fellowship of the Ring (2001), The Two Towers (2002) and The Return of the King (2003). Set fifteen years after the War of the Ring, the game features Samwise Gamgee telling his children of the adventures of Aragorn during the conflict; his stories form the majority of the game's content. Aragorn's Quest was the first Lord of the Rings game released by WB Games, who had acquired the rights to make games based on the New Line Cinema film series from Electronic Arts in 2009.

The game was aimed primarily at younger players, offering a simplified and less violent version of the plots of the three films. It received mixed reviews; the game's graphics, level design and accessibility were praised, but critics found the combat repetitive, the narrative too truncated and the overall game too easy.

== Gameplay ==
=== Wii and PlayStation 3 versions ===
Two-player mode in the PS3 version of the game. Aragorn and Gandalf fight a Troll. Aragorn's weapon selection is on the bottom left; Gandalf's power-up spell reference is on the bottom right.

On the Wii and PlayStation 3, Aragorn's Quest is an action-adventure game played from a third-person perspective. The game is divided up into two different gameplay sections. The main game sees the player control Aragorn, as Samwise Gamgee tells his children stories of Aragorn's adventures during the War of the Ring fifteen years previously through eight levels that can either be linear or non-linear, consisting of diverse mandatory and optional quests. The other gameplay section is located in the Shire in the game's present, with the player controlling Sam's son, Frodo in a free-roam overworld, as he helps his fellow Hobbits prepare a party for the arrival of Aragorn. Gameplay in both areas is the same, and the game is structured in such a way that as Frodo learns skills in the Shire, these skills then become available to Aragorn in the main game. If a second player is present, they control Frodo's sister Elanor in the Shire, and Gandalf in the main game. However, the players cannot switch characters - player one must be Aragorn and Frodo, and player two must also be Gandalf and Elanor.

During combat, the player has five basic sword attack moves; an upward swipe, a downward swipe, a left swipe, a right swipe, and a thrust. Later in the game, Aragorn can use charged up versions of each of the five main attacks. The player can also access chain attacks (attacks which increase in power with each successful attack) and special abilities such as "Battle Cry" (which makes allies fight harder) and "Rally" (which makes allies temporarily invulnerable). The Wii version of the game is controlled via the Wii Remote and Nunchuk, becoming one of the few Wii games, including Nintendo's The Legend of Zelda: Twilight Princess and the then-forthcoming The Legend of Zelda: Skyward Sword, to implement sword combat. The PlayStation 3 version can be controlled via either the DualShock 3 or the PlayStation Move.

At most times during the game, the player is accompanied by AI controlled allies. The player can acquire upgrades for these AI companions, such as increasing their attack and defense, finding weapon and armour upgrades or unlocking new combat abilities. In the Wii and PlayStation 3 versions, a second player can drop in and play as Gandalf at any time during the game. Gandalf controls similarly to Aragorn. His main weapon is his staff, which also functions as his long range weapon. He also has the ability to heal Aragorn or grant certain boosts to him by casting spells that mimic the effects of power-up herbs found in Middle-Earth that Aragorn can pick.

=== PlayStation 2 and handheld versions ===
Gameplay in the DS version of the game. The map is on the top of the screen, the gameplay window on the bottom.

The PlayStation 2 and handheld versions of the game are different from the Wii and PS3 version in several ways. For example, they lack a co-op mode or the free-roam Shire overworld. However, it includes an arena mode not featured in the Wii and PS3 versions, and levels set in Caradhras, at the Gates of Moria (including a battle with the Watcher in the Water), and in Dunharrow, areas not found in the Wii/PS3 versions. This version is played from an isometric three-quarter top-down view, and is more of an action role-playing game, featuring stat-management and experience points to spend on special abilities. The Wii/PS3 version does not feature any kind of stat-management or experience points, save for the abovementioned ability to collect items to improve the attack and defense of characters.

== Synopsis ==
=== Background ===
The game is presented against the background of the history of the One Ring. At the dawn of the Second Age, after the defeat of the Dark Lord, Morgoth, the elves forged Rings of Power to help themselves, the dwarves and men rule Middle-earth. However, the elves were unaware that Sauron, Morgoth's closest ally, had survived his master's defeat, and in the guise of Annatar had been the one who taught the Elven-smiths, led by Celebrimbor, how to forge the Rings, whilst, in secret, he forged his own One Ring in the fires of Mount Doom, a Ring far more powerful than any of the others. However, in order for the One Ring to be powerful enough to control the other Rings, Sauron had to transfer most of his power into it. As soon as he put it on, the elves became aware of his ruse, removing and hiding their Three Rings, which Celebrimbor had forged without Sauron's aid. Sauron waged war on the elves, conquering much of Middle-earth and killing Celebrimbor. Thus began the Dark Years, when Sauron took possession of the remaining sixteen Rings, giving seven to the dwarves and nine to men in an effort to corrupt them. The dwarves proved relatively immune to the powers of the Rings, acquiring only a greed for gold, and becoming unconcerned with events in the wider world. Men proved less resilient, and the nine kings given the Rings became Ringwraiths, hooded and mystical servants of Sauron.

In his ongoing efforts to conquer Middle-earth, Sauron regained the allegiance of many of Morgoth's servants from the First Age, and successfully corrupted Númenor. However, in doing so, he expended a great deal of his power, and lost the ability to ever again assume a pleasing disguise. Returning to Mordor, he regained his strength, eventually capturing Minas Ithil. However, realizing that if they did not join together, Sauron would destroy both men and elves, Elendil, King of Arnor, and Gil-galad, King of Noldor, formed the Last Alliance of Men and Elves, and attacked Sauron in his fortress, Barad-dûr. The alliance was victorious, with Isildur cutting the One Ring from Sauron's hand. However, although presented with a chance to destroy the Ring forever, Isildur, already beginning to succumb to its corruption, chose not to do so. As such, although Sauron's physical form was vanquished, his spirit, bound to the Ring, survived. Some time later, Isildur was attacked and killed by a band of orcs, and the Ring was lost in the river Anduin for over two thousand years.

Meanwhile, during the Third Age, a still weakened Sauron covertly established a stronghold at Dol Guldur. In response to this undetermined evil, the Valar sent five Maiar to Middle-earth. Taking the form of wizards, they were led by Saruman. Unsure of the origin of the evil power in Dol Guldur, the wizard Gandalf was sent to investigate. However, Sauron hid from Gandalf, waiting for four hundred years before returning. Around the same time, the One Ring was found by a Hobbit named Sméagol, who became utterly corrupted by it, living in the caves of the Misty Mountains, and physically transforming into a creature known as Gollum. For five hundred years, Gollum was consumed and corrupted by the Ring. Eventually, Gandalf was able to determine the evil presence in Dol Guldur was indeed Sauron. Gandalf reported back to the White Council, but Saruman dissuaded them from moving against Sauron. Only when he learned the One Ring may be in the vicinity of the Gladden Fields did Saruman agree to attack Sauron, hoping to find the Ring himself. The Council drove Sauron from Dol Guldur, unaware that he knew the Ring had been found. Just prior to Sauron's departure, the Ring passed to another hobbit, Bilbo Baggins, who used it to assist in the victory of elves, men and dwarves at the Battle of the Five Armies. Sixty years later, Gollum was captured by Uruk-hai, and taken to Mordor, where he was tortured into revealing the owner and location of the Ring; Bilbo Baggins of the Shire. In the meantime, Bilbo had left the Shire to live in Rivendell, and upon the advice of Gandalf had (very reluctantly) given the Ring to his nephew, Frodo Baggins. With the information given him by Gollum, Sauron, still unable to take physical form, thus sent the Nazgûl to the Shire to retrieve the One Ring. Frodo, and his friends, Samwise Gamgee, Peregrin "Pippin" Took and Meriadoc "Merry" Brandybuck managed to escape the Shire and head towards Bree.

=== Plot ===
The game is set fifteen years after the War of the Ring. Sam (voiced by Sean Astin) is now Mayor of the Shire, and is preparing a party for Aragorn, now King Elessar of Gondor (voiced by Viggo Mortensen, using sound samples from the films). While awaiting his arrival, Sam tells the story of Aragorn's adventures during the War to his four children, Elanor (Mary Mouser), Frodo (Eric Artell), Merry (Bridger Zadina) and Pippin (Elan Garfias). The game alternates between Sam telling the story, and Frodo helping him prepare for the party.

The story begins with Aragorn having met the Hobbits in Bree and successfully hidden them from the Nazgûl. They head for Rivendell, and camp at Weathertop. However, during the night, they are attacked by the Nazgûl. Aragorn is able to temporarily fend them off, but Frodo (Yuri Lowenthal) is stabbed with a Morgul blade. The party continue towards Rivendell, closely pursued by the Nazgûl, and with Frodo "passing into shadow." They soon encounter Arwen (Jennifer Hale), who takes Frodo and rides on ahead. She crosses the river Bruinen and as the Nazgûl attempt to cross after her, she uses elven magic to cause the river to rise, washing them away. She enters Rivendell, taking Frodo to her father, Elrond (Jim Piddock), who heals him.

Meanwhile, a council has been called between the Free Peoples of Middle-earth to determine the fate of the One Ring. The council decide the Ring must be brought to Mordor and cast into the fires of Mount Doom. A fellowship of nine is formed to accompany the Ring; Frodo, Sam, Pippin (Kieron Elliott), Merry (Eric Artell), Gandalf (Tom Kane), Aragorn, Boromir (Steve Blum), Legolas (Crispin Freeman) and Gimli (John Rhys-Davies). The fellowship set out, attempting to cross the Misty Mountains vis the Pass of Caradhras. However, a storm called forth by Gandalf's former friend, the wizard Saruman, now an ally of Sauron, closes the pass. The fellowship decide the only way past the Misty Mountains is to go under them, via the dwarven mines of Moria.

Upon entering Moria, Gimli is devastated to learn rumors regarding Balin and the dwarves are true; they have been wiped out by orcs. The fellowship fight their way to the Chamber of Mazarbul, where they find the tomb of Balin, and a record of how the mines were lost. Fighting their way through a hoard of orcs and trolls, they are attacked by a Balrog. They flee, reaching the Bridge of Khazad-dûm, where Gandalf defeats the Balrog by destroying the bridge as it stands on it. However, as the Balrog falls, it catches Gandalf with its whip, pulling him down after it.

The fellowship leave Moria and pass through Lothlórien. Soon thereafter, they are attacked by a party of Uruk-hai. Frodo and Sam set off to Mordor alone, Boromir is killed, and Merry and Pippin are taken prisoner by the Uruks. Aragorn, Gimli and Legolas set out in pursuit across Rohan, heading towards Saruman's home in Isengard. The trio catch up to see the Uruks wiped out by the Rohirrim, led by Éomer (Chris Edgerly). The Riders tell them that they did not see the hobbits, but suggest that they may have fled into nearby Fangorn Forest. Moving through Fangorn, the trio encounter Elder (Bob Joles), an Ent, who tells them the orcs of Isengard are using the wood of Fangorn to construct weapons and siege towers. They help Elder destroy two construction camps, before he goes to tell the other Ents of Saruman's treachery. Meanwhile, continuing to track Merry and Pippin, the trio encounter Gandalf, resurrected by the Valar to aid in the coming war. He tells them Merry and Pippin are safe with the Ents, and instead, they must travel to Edoras, where the king of Rohan, Théoden (Brian George), has had his mind corrupted by Saruman's magic.

They reach Edoras, and Gandalf is able to expel Saruman from Théoden's mind. Théoden decides to take the people of Rohan to Helm's Deep to stand against Saruman's oncoming army. As Gandalf rides to gather the Rohirrim, the others take shelter in the fortress. Soon, an army of 10,000 Uruk-hai attack. They breach the outer walls, and as Arargorn, Legolas, Gimli, Théoden and the remainder of the Rohan warriors prepare to make a suicide charge, Gandalf arrives with a vast army of Rohirrim, attacking the Uruk-hai from behind whilst the others attack from the front. Saruman's army is decimated. Meanwhile, the Ents march on the tower of Orthanc in Isengard, destroying it, and putting an end to Saruman's involvement in the war.

Followed by Théoden and the Rohirrim, Gandalf races ahead to Minas Tirith to aid Gondor in facing Sauron's army. Meanwhile, Aragorn enlists the support of the Dead Men of Dunharrow, before also heading to Gondor, reaching Minas Tirith in time to aid the defense of the city. Sauron's army is able to breach the walls, and the Witch-king of Angmar faces Gandalf and Aragorn in battle. The Witch-king defeats them, but before he can kill them, the Rohirrim arrive, and he heads to confront them. Aragorn and Gandalf leave the city, joining the Battle of the Pelennor Fields. During the battle, Théoden's niece Éowyn (Eliza Schneider) kills the Witch-king. Following this, the Dead Men of Dunharrow destroy Sauron's army.

With Minas Tirith safe, the army ride to the gates of Mordor to distract Sauron, keeping his eye away from Mount Doom so as to allow Frodo and Sam approach with the Ring. As anticipated, Sauron sends a massive army to confront them. With little chance for victory, they aim only to give Frodo enough time. As the battle rages, Frodo and Sam reach Mount Doom and destroy the Ring. With that, Sauron's tower, Barad-dûr, collapses, and his army is destroyed. Gandalf rescues Frodo and Sam with the help of the Great Eagles, and Aragorn is crowned king of Gondor.

Back in the present day in the Shire, Sam finishes his story just as Aragorn and Arwen arrive. Aragorn presents Sam with the Star of the Dúnedain, and the party begins.

== Development ==
The existence of Aragorn's Quest was initially leaked on 20 May 2009 by the Entertainment Software Association in their list of titles to debut at the upcoming E3 event. The ESA write-up for the game stated, "The Lord of the Rings: Aragorn's Quest is the first Lord of the Rings videogame created specifically for kids and their families with accessible gameplay set in a friendly, colorful rendition of Middle-earth. Players assume the role of Strider and embark on his greatest quests from The Lord of the Rings trilogy. The game offers authentic, action-oriented sword fighting that all ages can play together." The game was officially announced by WB Games in a press release a week later, noting the game was being developed for the Wii by Headstrong Games, but would also be available for Nintendo DS, PlayStation 2 and PlayStation Portable, developed by TT Fusion. The release date was slated for Fall 2009.

Aragorn's Quest would be the first Lord of the Rings game released by WB Games, after they obtained the license for videogames based on the film series from Electronic Arts in March. In an interview with GameSpot, WB Games president Martin Tremblay also revealed the company had acquired the rights to make games based on the literary series as well (these right had previously been held by Vivendi Universal Games), meaning that in the future, Lord of the Rings games would involve WB Games, New Line Cinema and Middle-earth Enterprises (the first game released under this all encompassing agreement was The Lord of the Rings: War in the North).

Aragorn's Quest was first shown on 3 June, at E3 2009, with a demo from the Wii version made available, featuring extracts from the Rivendell and Moria levels. In August, WB Games announced the game would be delayed until Spring 2010. On 10 March 2010, WB Games announced the game would also be available for the PlayStation 3 and would support the PlayStation Move. It was also revealed the PlayStation 3 version would be similar to the Wii version, featuring a two-player co-op option unavailable on the PS2 and handheld versions. With this announcement also came a further delay, pushing the release date back to Fall 2010 for all platforms.

The game was next shown at the following year's E3. Again, only the Wii version was on display, with the Pelennor Fields level available to play. In an interview with GameSpot, Headstrong Games development director Steve Pritchard stated:

What [Warner] asked us to do was turn it into a much broader audience title, stop making it gritty, photorealistic film reference, [sic] and just open it up to a bigger audience. So we took a little bit of a different slant on it. We took a game that we felt was appropriate for a broader audience, but perhaps the violence of the films, we just took it away a little. So for this game, it's very much more family friendly, it's more colourful, but we tried to keep it where the core Lord of the Rings audience wouldn't be turned off by that, which is something we never want to do [...] The Lord of the Rings always will be huge. As a gaming ideal, it's sort of where everything else came from; it's a fantasy game, it's swords, it's bad guys, it's magic, it's everything that's basically core fantasy, and fantasy does have a huge part in gaming.

GameSpot's Jane Douglas noted, "framing the game with a bedtime-storytelling narrator is Headstrong's way of turning the relatively dark fantasy of classic Lord of the Rings into a family-friendly Wii game, with Sam playing up Aragorn's heroism and omitting grislier details." In designing the upbeat visual style of the Wii version, Headstrong Games incorporated visual enhancements that it employed in Nintendo's Battalion Wars duology to create wide open environments filled with visually appealing colour, landmarks and characters. Developers were also faced with the challenge of ensuring that the game's engine was capable of showing many characters onscreen at once without suffering from significant slowdown, so that it could capture the epic action of large-scale battles that occurred towards the end of the film trilogy. The PlayStation 3 port of the game utilizes the EMotion FX 3 character animation system. Due to its rushed development, the PS3 version's North American copies shipped without support for the Move controllers in the game disc's code, requiring a free patch to be downloaded in order for them to be usable.

When asked about whether Aragorn's Quest would also be available on the Xbox 360 and utilize its Kinect sensor, Pritchard stated that there were no plans to develop an Xbox 360 version and the developers have not come up with a way for the game to take advantage of that peripheral. The idea of having a second player take control of Gandalf to assist the first player in the Wii and PS3 versions was seen as an effort to combine the cooperative helper mechanics of the Super Mario Galaxy duology with combat reminiscent of 3-D The Legend of Zelda action-adventure titles, and it was originally planned to have Gandalf's movement controlled automatically with artificial intelligence, allowing the second player to use just a Wii Remote or a Move Controller by itself to control his attacks and spells. However, in the final product, Gandalf's movement is controlled manually with an analog stick, requiring the Nunchuk or Navigation Controller, with the player shaking the former or clicking the latter's analog stick to unleash a staff strike area attack.

Role-playing game artist David Hudnut had a hand in designing the game's cover art.

== Reception ==
Reception

Aggregate score
| Aggregator | Score | | | | |
| Aggregator | DS | PS2 | PS3 | PSP | Wii |
|---|---|---|---|---|---|
| Metacritic | | | 58/100 | | 58/100 |

Review scores
| Publication | Score | | | | |
| Publication | DS | PS2 | PS3 | PSP | Wii |
|---|---|---|---|---|---|
| Edge | | | | | 5/10 |
| GameRevolution | | | | | C− |
| GameSpot | | | | | 7/10 |
| GameZone | | | | | 4/10 |
| IGN | 5/10 | 5/10 | 6/10 | 5/10 | 7/10 |
| Nintendo Life | 6/10 | | | | 5/10 |
| PlayStation Official Magazine – UK | | | 2.5/5 | | |

The game received mixed reviews. Both the PlayStation 3 version and the Wii version hold a score of 58 out of 100 on Metacritic.

Common Sense Media gave high marks for the Wii version, with a score of four stars out of five. Christopher Healy praised the game's accessibility to a wider audience, cooperative mode and uncomplicated depth in his brief four star-rated assessment of the game's quality.

GameSpot's Carolyn Petit scored the Wii version 7 out of 10, saying "despite some flaws, Aragorn's Quest is an engaging adventure across a well-realized version of Middle-earth." She was critical of the responsiveness of the Wii Remote and found the game too easy, but concluded "this is a good adventure for would-be Aragorns of any age. It does a particularly fine job of evoking the memorable locations of Middle-earth, so those with a deep appreciation for Tolkien's books or Jackson's films may have an easier time overlooking the game's faults."

IGN's Craig Harris also scored the Wii version 7 out of 10, and the PlayStation 3 version 6 out of 10, calling the game "a CliffsNotes version of the three films that works better on Wii than it does on PS3." He called the PlayStation 3 version, "a rushed and flawed port of a game made for a significantly weaker system." He was also critical of the PlayStation Move control, preferring the DualShock. He concluded "Lord of the Rings: Aragorn's Quest is a fun and satisfying, if just a tad repetitive, action adventure with good fan service to those of you that love the Tolkien novels and Peter Jackson films." He scored the PS2, PSP and DS versions 5 out of 10, criticising the "mindless button-mashing action that feels more in line with a game like Gauntlet, but with only one character to control, no multiplayer, and incredibly shallow action mechanics."

Nintendo Life's Jamie O'Neill scored the DS version 6 out of 10. He praised the use of stat management in the game, and was complimentary of the graphics, but found the gameplay too easy. He concluded "The portable version of Aragorn's Quest is different enough to provide a satisfying supplement to the Wii game." Spencer McIlvaine scored the Wii version 5 out of 10. He praised the two-player mode, but called the game an "average hack-'n-slash, concluding "while there are some Lord of the Rings games that should not have been forgotten, this one is barely worth playing the first time."

Edge also scored the Wii version 5 out of 10. They were critical of the narrative style, arguing "Sam's telling as a whole really makes little sense - characters and objectives are introduced without explanation, enemies like Saruman and Sauron given no distinction or comprehension." They were also critical of the combat; "the screen is sometimes crowded by enemies and effects to the point of being unreadable, while the automated lock-on system spins and disorients you. With its motion blur, over-enthusiastic collision detection and clumsy geometry, Aragorn's Quest presents circumstances in which you couldn't make meaningful tactical decisions without frustration, and so chooses to make tactics largely obsolete instead."

GameRevolution scored the Wii version a C−, criticising the narrative style and the responsiveness of the Wii Remote. They concluded "the game's biggest flaw is its story, which is ironic due to the fact that the Lord of the Rings trilogy is all about its story [...] between the ineffective dialogue and rushed scenes, it just didn't hold my attention. This is one fantasy-adventure you may want to miss out on."

GameZone's Brian Rowe scored the Wii version 4 out of 10. He too was critical of the story, arguing "the only way to understand the game is to have prior knowledge of the movies/books," and concluding the game "doesn't have any glaring issues that could be considered problematic. Rather, the breezy story, irrelevant quests, and carefree combat fail to inspire any sense of wonder or excitement."
