= Thorin Oakenshield =

Leader of the Dwarves in The Hobbit

- Tolkien character

In-universe information
- Race: Dwarf
- Title(s): King under the Mountain; King of Durin's Folk
- Book(s): The Hobbit (1937); Unfinished Tales (1980)

Thorin Oakenshield (Thorin II) is a fictional character in J. R. R. Tolkien's 1937 novel The Hobbit. Thorin is the leader of the Company of Dwarves who aim to reclaim the Lonely Mountain from Smaug the dragon. He is the son of Thráin II, grandson of Thrór, and becomes King of Durin's Folk during their exile from Erebor. Thorin's background is further elaborated in Appendix A of Tolkien's 1955 novel The Return of the King, and in Unfinished Tales.

Commentators have noted that Thorin is Old Norse both in name and character, being surly, illiberal, independent, proud, aristocratic, and like all Dwarves greedy for gold. Tolkien was a Roman Catholic; from a Christian perspective, Thorin exemplifies the deadly sin of avarice, but is able to free himself from it at the time of his death. This deathbed conversion has been compared to the moral transformation of Ebenezer Scrooge in Charles Dickens's A Christmas Carol.

Thorin appears in Peter Jackson's The Hobbit film series, in the Rankin/Bass animated version, and in the 1982 game of the same name.

== Appearances ==
=== The Hobbit ===
"Long ago in my grandfather Thror's time our family was driven out of the far North, and came back with all their wealth and their tools to this Mountain on the map."

— Thorin describes his background to Bilbo in ch. 1 "An Unexpected Party"

In The Hobbit, Thorin, a Dwarf-King in exile and twelve other Dwarves visited Bilbo Baggins at his home in the Shire. The wizard Gandalf had advised Thorin and the other dwarves to hire Bilbo as a burglar to help them steal their treasure back from the dragon Smaug. Smaug had attacked the Dwarves's mountain, Erebor (also known as the Lonely Mountain), about 150 years before, and had taken both the mountain and the dwarves' treasure. Thorin was determined to get the treasure back. He especially wanted the Arkenstone, the Heart of the Mountain, which was an heirloom of the dwarves' Kingdom. (Note: Tolkien 1937, ch. 1 "An Unexpected Party")

Others took up the song and it rolled loud and high over the lake.

The King beneath the mountains,
The King of carven stone,
The lord of silver fountains
Shall come into his own!

— The people of Lake-town welcome Thorin in ch. 10 "A Warm Welcome"

On their journey, the dwarves and Bilbo were taken captive by a band of trolls; Thorin was the only dwarf not to be taken unawares. After Gandalf rescued the company (letting dawn turn the trolls to stone), they opened the trolls' lair. Thorin found the Elven blade Orcrist in the trolls' cache. (Note: Tolkien 1937, ch. 2 "Roast Mutton") Later, Thorin used Orcrist to fight goblins in the tunnels beneath the Misty Mountains. While the rest of the company battled the goblins, Bilbo found a magic ring in a tunnel under the Misty Mountains and used it to escape from the monster Gollum and from the goblins. (Note: Tolkien 1937, ch. 4 "Over Hill and Under Hill")

When the Dwarves were captured by the Wood-elves of Mirkwood, Thorin insisted that the others not disclose their quest to their captors. (Note: Tolkien 1937, ch. 8 "Flies and Spiders") Bilbo, invisible with his magic ring, evaded capture and organised the company's escape, which they accomplished by floating in barrels out of the Wood-elves' fastness. When Thorin emerged from his barrel at Lake-town, he marched up to the town's leaders and identified himself as King Under the Mountain. (Note: Tolkien 1937, ch. 10 "A Warm Welcome")

"How came you by it?" shouted Thorin in gathering rage.

"I gave it to them!" squeaked Bilbo...

"You! You!" cried Thorin, turning upon him and grasping him with both hands. "You miserable hobbit! You undersized – burglar!"

— Thorin responds angrily to Bilbo's taking of the Arkenstone in ch. 17 "The Clouds Burst"

With provisions from Lake-town, Thorin led the company to Erebor. (Note: Tolkien 1937, ch. 11 "On the Doorstep") Seeing that Smaug was not there, the Dwarves reclaimed some of the treasure; Thorin gave Bilbo "a small coat of mail" made of mithril as the first installment of the payment due for his services. (Note: Tolkien 1937, ch. 13 "Not at Home") (Note: Decades later, in The Lord of the Rings, Bilbo gave the mithril shirt to his relative, Frodo Baggins. Frodo was "staggered" to learn that the mithril shirt's worth "was greater than the value of the whole Shire and everything in it". (Note: Tolkien 1954a, book 2, ch. 4, "A Journey in the Dark")) The Dwarves then learnt from the ancient raven Roäc that Smaug had been killed: Bard the Bowman had managed to shoot Smaug as the dragon was in the process of destroying Lake-town. (Note: Tolkien 1937, ch. 15 "The Gathering of the Clouds")

Faced with demands from Thranduil the Elvenking and Bard for a fair share of the treasure to be distributed to the Wood-elves and the men of Lake-town, Thorin refused to acknowledge their right to any of the hoard. He fortified the Mountain against his new rivals and sent to his cousin Dáin Ironfoot for reinforcements. Thorin was furious when he discovered that Bilbo had stolen the Arkenstone to use as a bargaining chip, and he sent him from the Mountain. Conflict amongst the dwarves, men, and elves was averted only by an invasion of goblins and wargs, whereupon the Dwarves joined forces with the Wood-elves, the men of Lake-town, and the great eagles in the Battle of Five Armies. (Note: Tolkien 1937, ch. 17 "The Clouds Burst")

"If more of us valued food and cheer and song above hoarded gold, it would be a merrier world. But, sad or merry, I must leave it now. Farewell."

— Thorin repents on his deathbed, accepting Bilbo in ch. 18 "The Return Journey"

During the battle, Thorin was mortally wounded, but he made his peace with Bilbo before he died. When Thorin died, he was buried with the Arkenstone. Orcrist was laid upon his tomb. The blade would glow blue if Orcs should approach; thus, they could not take the Mountain by surprise. Thorin was succeeded as leader of Durin's Folk by his cousin Dáin. (Note: Tolkien 1937, ch. 18 "The Return Journey")

=== The Lord of the Rings ===
Part III of Appendix A in The Return of the King gives an overview of the history of Durin's Folk and more of Thorin's background. When Thorin was 53 (young for a Dwarf), he marched with a mighty dwarf-army against the orcs of Moria. After the battle he led his people to establish a foothold in the Blue Mountains west of the Shire. (Note: Tolkien 1955, Appendix A, Part III)

=== Unfinished Tales ===
Unfinished Tales elaborates on Thorin's reasons for accepting Bilbo into his company. As depicted in the story "The Quest of Erebor", Thorin met with Gandalf in Bree shortly before the quest began. Gandalf persuaded him that stealth, rather than force, was needed to infiltrate Erebor; they would therefore need a burglar. Gandalf feared that Sauron could use Smaug as a weapon, and was concerned that Thorin's pride and quick temper would ruin the mission to destroy the dragon. He thought that Bilbo would be a calming influence on Thorin, as well as a genuinely valuable addition to the company. Thorin, who did not think much of Hobbits, reluctantly agreed, calculating that Bilbo's presence would be a small price to pay for Gandalf's help. (Note: Tolkien 1980, part 3, ch. 3 "The Quest of Erebor")

== Origins ==
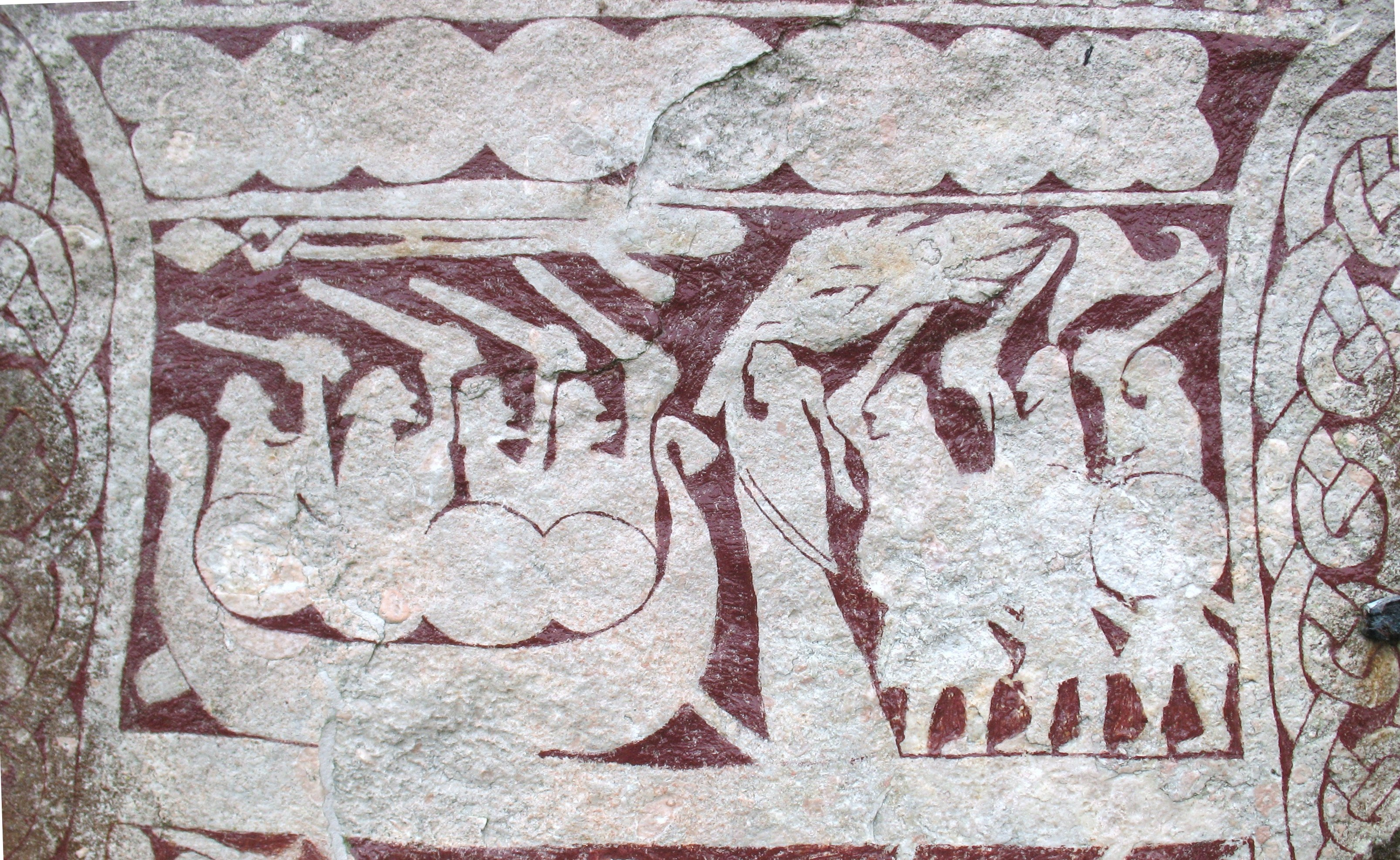
Detail from the Stora Hammars I stone, depicting the Hjaðningavíg

Tolkien adopted Thorin's names from the Dvergatal, the list of Dwarves, in the Old Norse poem "Völuspá", which is part of the Poetic Edda. The name "Thorin" (Þorinn) appears in stanza 12, where it is used for a dwarf, and the name "Oakenshield" (Eikinskjaldi) in stanza 13. The name "Thorin" ultimately derives from that of the Norse god Thor; it means darer or bold one. The names also appear in Snorri Sturluson's Prose Edda.

Dwarfs in Germanic folklore are skilled in metalwork, including making weapons, ships, rings and jewellery; they are knowledgeable and strong. They are characterised as having a strong association with gold, mining, wealth, living underneath mountains, and being long-lived, ungrateful, and getting into arguments about payment. The Tolkien critic Tom Shippey suggests that Tolkien's "master-text" for his Dwarves was the Hjaðningavíg. In that legend, the Dwarves are characterised by revenge, as in "the long and painful vengeance of [Thorin's father] Thráin for [Thorin's grandfather] Thrór", and Shippey argues that Tolkien chose these qualities for his Dwarves.

== Analysis ==
Shippey writes that in chapters 6–8 of The Hobbit, Tolkien explores "with delight that surly, illiberal independence often the distinguishing mark of Old Norse heroes". The philosophers Gregory Bassham and Eric Bronson contrast the way Tolkien introduces hobbits, as "plain, quiet folks who never do anything unexpected", with how Thorin would have "introduce[d] himself, with aristocratic titles and songs of ancient lineage. We do not open the book to read of the wrath of Thorin the way we learn of the wrath of Achilles in the opening lines of The Iliad."

The Tolkien scholar Paul H. Kocher writes that Tolkien characterises Dwarves as having the "cardinal sin of 'possessiveness'", seen sharply when Bard the Bowman makes what Bilbo feels is a fair offer for a share of Smaug's treasure, and Thorin flatly refuses, his "dwarfish lust for gold fevered by brooding on the dragon's hoard".

The Jesuit John L. Treloar, writing in Mythlore, suggests that Tolkien, a Catholic, explores the seven deadly sins in his Middle-earth writings. He states that in The Hobbit, both Smaug and Thorin exemplify avarice, but respond to it differently. In his view, Smaug is evil and lets avarice destroy him, whereas Thorin, sharing the general weakness of Dwarves for this particular vice, nevertheless has sufficient good will to free himself of it at the time of his death.

Bassham and Bronson compare Thorin's deathbed "conversion" from his greed and pride, as he reconciles himself with Bilbo, to Ebenezer Scrooge's "big moral transformation" from grumpy miserliness to generosity and cheerfulness in Charles Dickens's 1843 novella A Christmas Carol.

== Adaptations ==
Richard Armitage as Thorin Oakenshield in Peter Jackson's The Hobbit

In the 1977 animated version of The Hobbit, Thorin is voiced by Hans Conried.

In the 1985 Soviet television play The Hobbit, Thorin was played by Anatoly Ravikovich.

In Peter Jackson's three-film adaptation of The Hobbit (2012–2014), Thorin is portrayed by Richard Armitage. The film adaptation adds to Thorin's quest an arch-enemy in the form of the villainous orc leader Azog, as well as a history of enmity with Thranduil, which began with a dispute between his grandfather Thrór and the Elvenking over the White Gems of Lasgalen. In his review, Erik Kain from Forbes wrote that Thorin stood out as a remarkable character with shades of dark and light, at once heroic and stubborn to a fault.

In the 1982 game The Hobbit Thorin appears as an AI controlled character and one of his seemingly random actions ("Thorin sits down and starts singing about gold", which occurs when the player does nothing for a while) became quite famous. In the 2003 video game, Thorin is voiced by Clive Revill.

== Family tree ==
Durin's Folk, showing the Dwarvish tendency to have few children (and fewer daughters) (Note: Tolkien 1955, Appendix A, part 3, "Durin's Folk") (Note: Names in italics in the family tree are Thorin and his company from The Hobbit.)

Durin I	Dwarves of Moria
Durin VI
Náin I
Thráin I
Thorin I
Glóin
Óin
Náin II
Dáin I	Borin
Frór	Thrór	Grór	Farin
Thráin II	Náin	Fundin	Gróin
Dís (♀)	Thorin II; Oakenshield	Dáin II; Ironfoot	Dwalin, Balin	Glóin	Óin	Ori, Dori, Nori	Bifur, Bofur, Bombur
Fili, Kili	Thorin III; Stonehelm	Gimli
Durin VII
