= Mithril =

Fictional metal in J. R. R. Tolkien's writings

Mithril is a fictional metal found in J. R. R. Tolkien's Middle-earth writings. It is described as resembling silver, but being stronger and lighter than steel. It was used to make armour, such as the helmets of the citadel guard of Minas Tirith, and ithildin alloy, used to decorate gateways with writing visible only by starlight or moonlight. Always extremely valuable, by the end of the Third Age it was beyond price, and only a few artefacts made of it remained in use.

Impenetrable armour occurs in Norse mythology in Hervarar saga ok Heiðreks, a story that Tolkien certainly knew and could have used for his mithril mail-coat. Mithril is the only invented metal in his Middle-earth writings. Chemists note mithril's remarkable properties, strong and light like titanium, perhaps when made into alloys with elements such as titanium or nickel, and in its pure form malleable like gold.

The scholar Charles A. Huttar states that Tolkien treats mineral treasures as having the potential for both good and evil, recalling the association of mining and metalwork in John Milton's Paradise Lost with Satan.

The metal appears in many derivative fantasy works by later authors.

== Tolkien ==
=== Etymology ===
The name mithril comes from two words in Tolkien's Sindarin language—mith, meaning "grey", and ril, meaning "glitter". (Note: Tolkien 1954a, book 2, ch. 4 "A Journey in the Dark") The Dwarves kept their own name for the material secret.

=== Properties ===
In The Hobbit, Thorin Oakenshield described some Dwarven treasures as "coats of mail gilded and silvered and impenetrable" and "a coat of dwarf-linked rings the like of which had never been made before, for it was wrought of pure silver to the power and strength of triple steel." (Note: Tolkien 1937, ch. 12 "Inside Information") A little later the narrator describes "a small coat of mail, wrought for some young elf-prince long ago. It was of silver-steel which the elves call mithril". (Note: Tolkien 1937, ch. 13 "Not At Home" (mention of mithril from 1966 edition onwards))

In The Fellowship of the Ring, the wizard Gandalf explained mithril to the rest of the Fellowship in Moria:

Mithril! All folk desired it. It could be beaten like copper, and polished like glass; and the Dwarves could make of it a metal, light and yet harder than tempered steel. Its beauty was like to that of common silver, but the beauty of mithril did not tarnish or grow dim.

The Noldor of Eregion, the Elvish land to the west of Moria, made an alloy from it called ithildin ("star moon"), used to decorate gateways, portals and pathways. It was visible only by starlight or moonlight. The West Gate of Moria bore inlaid ithildin designs and runes.

=== Abundance ===
In Tolkien's Middle-earth, mithril is extremely rare by the end of the Third Age, as it was now found only in Khazad-dûm. Once the Balrog destroyed Khazad-dûm, the kingdom of the Dwarves in Moria, the only source of new mithril ore was cut off. Before Moria was abandoned by the Dwarves, while it was still being actively mined, mithril was worth ten times its weight in gold. After the Dwarves abandoned Moria and production of new mithril stopped entirely, it became priceless.

Tolkien hints that mithril was found in the lost island kingdom of Númenor (Note: Tolkien 1980, part 3, ch. 1 "The Disaster of the Gladden Fields") and the inaccessible continent of Aman. (Note: Tolkien 1954a, book 2, ch. 1 "Many Meetings")

=== The mithril-coat ===
The principal item made of mithril in the works of Tolkien is the "small coat of mail" that Thorin Oakenshield gave to Bilbo Baggins after it had been retrieved from the hoard of Smaug the dragon. (Note: Tolkien 1937 ch. 13 "Not at Home") Gandalf stated that the value of this mithril-coat was "greater than the value of the whole Shire and everything in it". The mail-shirt was first described in The Hobbit in 1937, but without any mention of mithril. Tolkien first described the shirt as being made of mithril in The Lord of the Rings in 1954, and it was retrospectively mentioned in the third, revised edition of The Hobbit in 1966. In the first 1937 edition, the mail shirt given to Bilbo Baggins is described as being made of "silvered steel".

"Also there is this!" said Bilbo, bringing out a parcel which seemed to be rather heavy for its size. He unwound several folds of old cloth, and held up a small shirt of mail. It was close-woven of many rings, as supple almost as linen, cold as ice, and harder than steel. It shone like moonlit silver, and was studded with white gems.

Bilbo wore the mithril shirt during the Battle of the Five Armies. He donated it to the Mathom-house, a museum in Michel Delving. However he later reclaimed it, and took it with him when he left the Shire for his journey to Rivendell. There, some years later, he gave the shirt to Frodo Baggins when the younger hobbit embarked on his quest in The Lord of the Rings. Frodo wore the mail underneath his tunic and other shirt unbeknownst to the rest of the fellowship. The mail saved Frodo's life when he was struck by an orc chieftain's spear thrust during the battle in the Chamber of Mazarbul, and again when orc-arrows struck him while escaping Moria and while crossing the River Anduin. (Note: Tolkien 1954a, book 2, ch. 9 "The Great River")

When Sam Gamgee believed Frodo to be dead outside Shelob's Lair, he left the shirt with Frodo. (Note: Tolkien 1954, book 4, ch. 10, "The Choices of Master Samwise") Frodo was taken by the orcs, who fought over the shirt. Frodo was saved, but one of the orcs escaped with the shirt. (Note: Tolkien 1955, book 6, ch. 1, "The Tower of Cirith Ungol") In both Tolkien's and Peter Jackson's versions, the shirt was, along with Frodo's other possessions, shown to Frodo's allies at the Battle of the Morannon to imply falsely that he was imprisoned in Barad-dûr. (Note: Tolkien 1955, book 5, ch. 10 "The Black Gate Opens") Gandalf took the shirt and other tokens, but refused any offer of parley.

At the end of the story, Frodo wore the shirt at the celebrations and on the trip home. The shirt saved his life one last time when Saruman, who had taken over the Shire, tried to stab Frodo after Frodo spared his life. (Note: Tolkien 1955, book 6, ch. 8 "The Scouring of the Shire") When he left to sail to Elvenhome, he gave all his possessions to Sam. (Note: Tolkien 1955, book 6, ch. 9 "The Grey Havens")

=== Other objects ===
Artist's impression of the standard of the kings of Gondor, with a crown made of mithril and gold.

Nenya, the Ring of Power wielded by Galadriel, was made of mithril.

The guards of the citadel of Minas Tirith wore helmets of mithril, "heirlooms from the glory of old days". They were the only soldiers in Gondor who still bore the emblems of the lost kings during the days of the stewards. (Note: Tolkien 1955, book 5, ch. 2 "The Passing of the Grey Company")

As Aragorn's ships sailed up the Anduin to relieve the besieged Minas Tirith during the Battle of the Pelennor Fields, the standard flying on his ship showed a crown made of mithril and gold. (Note: Tolkien 1955, book 5, ch. 6 "The Battle of the Pelennor Fields")

After Gimli became lord of Aglarond, he and his Dwarves forged great gates of mithril and steel to replace the gates of Minas Tirith, which had been broken by the Witch-king of Angmar. (Note: Tolkien 1955, Appendix A, part 3.)

The Elendilmir, the Star of Arnor, was a "white star of Elvish crystal upon a fillet of mithril". It was made for Silmariën, mother of Valandil; it passed down to Elendil. It was found in Orthanc when the Ents returned the tower to King Aragorn, evidence that Saruman had found and apparently destroyed Isildur's remains.

Greatest of all, according to legend, was the ship of Eärendil, Vingilótë, which he sailed into the sky, making the gleam of truesilver visible to the world as the Evening and Morning Star. The "Song of Eärendil", written by Bilbo and Aragorn, contains the lines "A ship then new they built for him / of mithril and of elven-glass". The linguist of Elvish languages Anthony Appleyard wrote that this machine, with "no shaven oar nor sail", was evidently of an advanced technology, "sound[ing] suspiciously like most people's image of a spaceship."

== Analysis ==
=== Origins ===
Norse culture contains myths of impenetrable armour, such as the shirt made by elves and used in battle by Örvar-Oddr (Ørvar Odd), as related in the Hervarar saga ok Heiðreks. The saga was translated by Christopher Tolkien, with a commentary, and his father was certainly familiar with the text.

The myth of the impenetrable mail-coat
Hervarar saga ok Heiðreks	Prose translation
Oddr svarar: "ek vil berjask við Angantýr, hann mun gefa stór högg með Tyrfingi, en ek trúi betr skyrtu minni, enn brynju þinni, til hlífðar"	Oddr answers: "I want to fight Angantýr, he will deliver a mighty blow with [his magic sword] Tyrfing, but I trust my shirt better than your armour for protection"

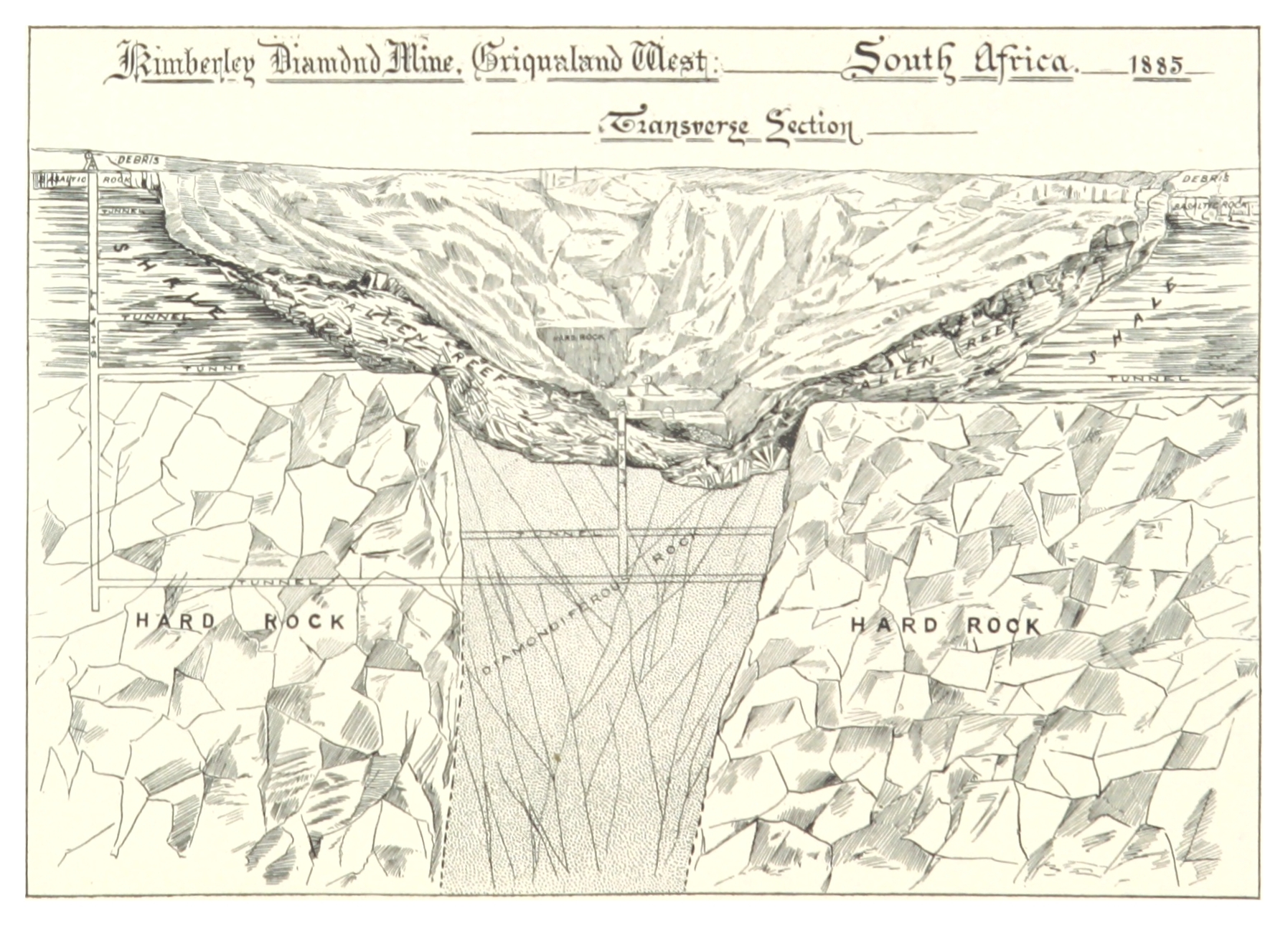
Semi-schematic drawing of Kimberley Diamond Mine in South Africa, 1885. Tolkien was born near deep mines, and may have chosen to use them in his fiction.

The mining executive Danièle Barberis notes that Tolkien was born in Bloemfontein, South Africa, in a busy mining region. She writes that it is "impossible ... not to make parallels" between Tolkien's descriptions of the deep mines of Moria and the exceptional depth of South African mines, some as much as 4,000 metres (13,000 ft) deep.

=== Metallurgy ===
The chemist Suze Kundu describes mithril as a metal, a pure chemical element with "a range of amazing chemical and physical properties" not matched by any real metal, and many applications. Of those that approach it, titanium is light (has a low density) and strong, but it is not malleable (able to be beaten into shape) like mithril. In Kundu's view the nearest material would be a stainless steel alloy of iron with enough nano-scale carbon to make it hard.

The metallurgist James Owen suggests that Mithril could be "an fcc [face-centred cubic] metal like aluminium or nickel, or possibly a bcc [body-centred cubic]" metal like titanium". Owen comments that it could form "strong, stiff, tough alloys" with those elements, suitable for "light sword blades and armour", or used as the pure element, when "it would be soft and malleable" like copper or gold. The geologist William Sarjeant, however, notes that mithril crystallises out "at so high a temperature that it is only found in veins at great depths", and proposes that it may be a native alloy of platinum with another metal, which might be palladium.

=== Significance ===
The scholar of English literature Charles A. Huttar writes that mithril was the only mineral that Tolkien invented. He notes that in Tolkien's underworld, whether the caves at Helm's Deep or the mines of Moria, "beauty and terror [were] side by side". Greed for mithril could unleash the terror of the Balrog, by digging too far down into the dark realm, but at the same time, he writes, the metal was prized for both its beauty and its usefulness, yielding the best armour. He compares the Dwarves' greed for mithril with that of the Barrow-wights for treasure, and indeed that of the dragons in The Hobbit and Beowulf for gold. In his view, these symbolise the evil "inherent in the mineral treasures hidden in the womb of Earth", just as mining and metalwork are associated with Satan in John Milton's Paradise Lost (I, 670–751). Huttar sums up with a reflection on Tolkien's moral vision in the story: just as the characters at every point have to decide for good or ill, so objects have the potential to be both good and evil: "Mithril is both the greatest of treasures and a deadly bane."

The Tolkien critic Paul Kocher interprets the Dwarves' intense secrecy around mithril and their devotion to artistry in metal and stone as "a sublimation of their sexual frustration", given that they have very few dwarf-women and love beauty with a "jealous possessiveness", or (quoting Tolkien) "being engrossed in their crafts".

== Influence ==
The name "mithril" (also spelt mith, mithral, or mythril by different authors) is used in multiple fictional contexts influenced by Tolkien. For example, the Final Fantasy game series, begun in 1987, depicted dwarves and mithril in its early instalments. Writing for CBR, Theo Kogod identified the Companions of the Hall's Mithral Hall as an example of Tolkien's influence on Dungeons & Dragons. He connected its name to mithril and compared the dwarven stronghold with Moria.

== Sources ==
- Libran Moreno, Miryam (2013) [2007]. "Elendilmir". In Drout, Michael D. C. (ed.). The J. R. R. Tolkien Encyclopedia: Scholarship and Critical Assessment. Routledge. pp. 146–147. ISBN 978-0-415-86511-1.
- Tolkien, J. R. R. (1937). The Hobbit. United Kingdom: George Allen & Unwin.
- Tolkien, J. R. R. (1954a). The Fellowship of the Ring. The Lord of the Rings. Boston: Houghton Mifflin. OCLC 9552942.
- Tolkien, J. R. R. (1954). The Two Towers. The Lord of the Rings. Boston: Houghton Mifflin. OCLC 1042159111.
- Tolkien, J. R. R. (1955). The Return of the King. The Lord of the Rings. Boston: Houghton Mifflin. OCLC 519647821.
- Tolkien, J. R. R. (1980). Christopher Tolkien (ed.). Unfinished Tales. Boston: Houghton Mifflin. ISBN 978-0-395-29917-3.
