= Lonely Mountain =

Middle-earth mountain

- Middle-earth location
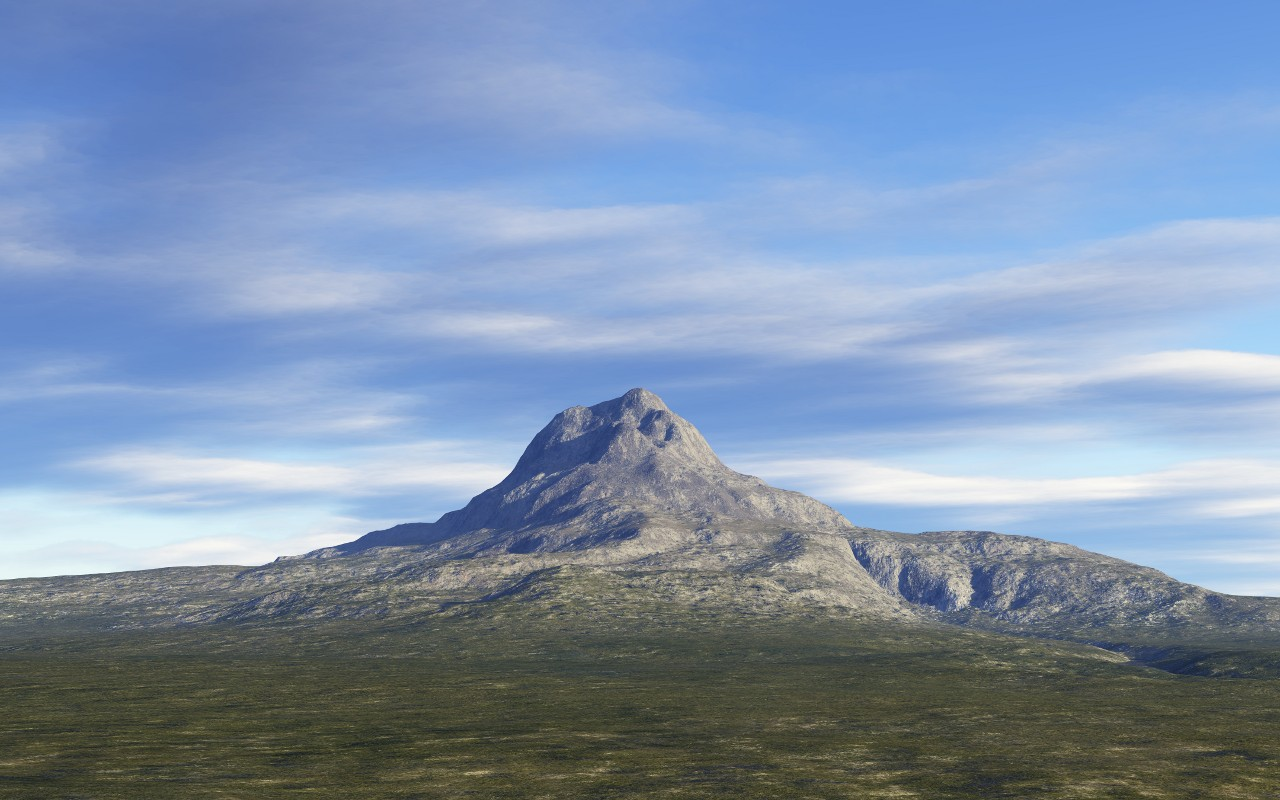
- Artist's depiction

In-universe information
- Other names: Erebor; the Kingdom under the Mountain
- Type: isolated mountain
- Ruled by: Kings of Durin's Folk: [1] T.A. 1999–2210, [2] 2590–2770, [3] 2941–Fourth Age; Smaug: T.A. 2770–2941
- Locations: the Chamber of Thrór, Dale, the Front Gate, the Great Hall, the Secret Door
- Location: Northeast of Mirkwood
- Founder: Thráin I

In J. R. R. Tolkien's legendarium, the Lonely Mountain is a mountain northeast of Mirkwood. It is the location of the Dwarves' Kingdom under the Mountain and the town of Dale lies in a vale on its southern slopes. In The Lord of the Rings, the mountain is called by the Sindarin name Erebor. (Note: Tolkien 1955, book 5, ch. 9 "The Last Debate") The Lonely Mountain is the destination of the protagonists, including the titular Hobbit Bilbo Baggins in The Hobbit, and is the scene of the novel's climax.

The mountain has been described as the goal of Bilbo's psychological quest in The Hobbit; scholars have noted that both it and The Lord of the Rings are structured as quests to a distant mountain, but that the quests have very different motivations. Further, the mountain is a symbol of adventure in The Hobbit, and of Bilbo's maturation as an individual, while to the Dwarves, it stands for the gain of beauty in return for loss of life.

== Fictional mountain ==
Erebor stands hundreds of miles from the nearest mountain range. Tolkien's rendering of Thrór's map in The Hobbit shows it with six ridges stretching out from a central peak that was snowcapped well into spring. The whole mountain is some ten miles in diameter; it contains an immense wealth of gold and jewels. (Note: Tolkien 1937, ch. 1 "An Unexpected Party")

=== Origins ===
Erebor becomes the home of the Folk of Durin, a clan of Dwarves known as the Longbeards, after they are driven from their ancestral home of Khazad-dûm. In the latter days of the Third Age, this Kingdom under the Mountain holds one of the largest dwarvish treasure hoards in Middle-earth. (Note: Tolkien 1955, Appendix A, "Annals of the Kings and Rulers", 3 "Durin's Folk") Dale, a town of Men built between the two southern spurs of Erebor, grew in harmony with the dwarves. The Kingdom under the Mountain is founded by Thráin I the Old, who had discovered the Arkenstone there. His son, Thorin I, leaves the mountain with much of the Folk of Durin to live in the Ered Mithrin (Grey Mountains) on account of the great riches to be found in that range. After dragons plunder their hoards, the Longbeards, led now by Thrór, a descendant of Thorin, return to Erebor to take up the title King under the Mountain. Under Thrór's reign, Erebor becomes a great stronghold where the dwarves are numerous and prosperous.

=== Erebor in The Hobbit ===
Sketch map of Northeast Mirkwood, showing the Elvenking's Halls, the Lonely Mountain of Erebor, and Esgaroth upon the Long Lake

In the Third Age, while the young Thorin II Oakenshield is out hunting, the dragon Smaug flies south from the Grey Mountains, kills all the dwarves he could find, and destroys the town of Dale. Smaug takes over the mountain, using the dwarves' hoard as a bed. King Thrór, his son Thráin II, and several companions escape death by a secret door. While Thrór and Thráin later perish, Thorin lives in exile in the Ered Luin, far to the west. On a journey, he meets the wizard Gandalf. Together they form a plan to reclaim the mountain. Gandalf insists that burglary is the best approach and recommends the hobbit Bilbo Baggins.

Bilbo, Thorin, and Thorin's company of twelve other Dwarves travel to the Lonely Mountain to regain the treasure. They plan to use the secret door, whose key and map Gandalf had obtained from Thráin, whom he had found at the point of death in the pits of Dol Guldur. On Durin's Day, when the setting sun and the last moon of autumn are in the sky together, the day's last sunlight falls on the door and exposes its keyhole. The Hobbit enters the mountain and steals a golden cup. (Note: Tolkien 1937, ch. 11 "On the Doorstep") (Note: Tolkien 1937, ch. 12 "Inside Information")

Smaug, enraged by the theft, emerges from the mountain and flies south to destroy Lake-town, which he suspects is the source of the "thieves". During this attack Smaug is killed by Bard the Bowman; Thorin claims the mountain on learning of Smaug's demise. (Note: Tolkien 1937, ch. 15 "The Gathering of the Clouds") However, the Men of Esgaroth, supported by Thranduil and the Elves of Mirkwood, march in force to the mountain to demand a part of the dragon's hoard as recompense for the destruction. Thorin, mad with greed, refuses all claims and sends word to his second cousin Dáin II Ironfoot, chief of the Dwarves of the Iron Hills, who brings reinforcements. Before battle can begin, an army of Orcs and Wargs descends on Erebor. Dwarves, Elves, and Men join ranks against them, leading to the Battle of Five Armies. Thorin's nephews Fíli and Kíli are killed, and Thorin is mortally injured; (Note: Tolkien 1937, ch. 17 "The Clouds Burst") he dies shortly afterwards. The title of King under the Mountain passes to Dáin. (Note: Tolkien 1937, ch. 19 "The Last Stage")

=== Erebor in The Lord of the Rings ===
With the restoration of the Kingdom under the Mountain, the area becomes prosperous again. Dale is rebuilt under Bard's leadership, and Dwarves and Men reforge their friendship. Some of the Dwarves, led by Balin, leave Erebor to reclaim the ancient Dwarvish Kingdom of Moria. (Note: Tolkien 1954a, book 2, ch. 2 "The Council of Elrond") They established a colony there but five years later Balin is killed by an Orc, and soon afterwards Moria is overrun by Orcs and the rest of the Dwarves are killed. Gimli, a dwarf of Erebor and the son of Glóin, one of Thorin's twelve companions, is chosen to represent his people in the Fellowship of the Ring; he helps Aragorn regain the throne of Gondor. (Note: Tolkien 1954a, book 2, ch. 3 "The Ring Goes South")

In the War of the Ring, an emissary from Sauron, the lord of Mordor, twice comes to Erebor and speaks to Dáin. The messenger asks for assistance in finding Bilbo Baggins and retrieving a stolen ring, and in return offers Moria and three of the seven Dwarf rings to Dáin, who declines to reply. Sauron's northern army, including many Easterlings, then attacks; Dale is overrun, and many Dwarves and Men take refuge in Erebor, which is promptly surrounded. Dáin is killed before the gates of Erebor defending the body of his fallen ally King Brand of Dale. Dáin's son Thorin III Stonehelm and King Bard II withstand the siege and rout Sauron's forces. (Note: Tolkien 1955, Appendix B "The Tale of Years")

== Analysis ==
=== Goal of psychological quest ===
The Jungian psychoanalyst Dorothy Matthews, viewing The Hobbit as a psychological quest, writes that the Lonely Mountain is an apt symbol of Bilbo's maturation as an individual, as the place where he takes on a leadership role and acts and makes decisions independently. The Tolkien scholar Jared Lobdell comments that he is "profoundly unsympathetic" to Matthews's approach, but that she "carries it off well". Lobdell explains, citing C. S. Lewis's essay "Psychoanalysis and Literary Criticism", that many different stories could, for instance, have the same Freudian interpretation, but be quite different as literature. He remarks on the other hand that a psychoanalytic approach is at least richer than a purely materialistic one.

The scholar of children's literature William H. Green calls the Lonely Mountain the fourth and final stage of Bilbo's education. He identifies multiple parallels and repetitions of structure between the stages, each one involving a journey, privation, and "unlikely escape". The Lonely Mountain stage, too, symbolically echoes the first stage in the Shire: before setting out, Bilbo was peacefully smoking a pipe of tobacco at his own front door; at the mountain, the smoke is the dragon's, and its meaning is anything but peaceful. The Christian writer Joseph Pearce views the journey to the Lonely Mountain as a "pilgrimage of grace", a Christian bildungsroman, at its deepest level. Pearce states further that Bilbo's quest to the mountain parallels Frodo's quest to a different mountain, Mount Doom, which he calls "a mirror of Everyman's journey through life".

Two scholars of literature, Paul Kocher and Randel Helms analyse Bilbo's journey to the Lonely Mountain, describing it as the goal of his quest and the point at which it is achieved. Both compare the quest in The Hobbit with that of The Lord of the Rings, noting that the two novels, for all their differences including the reason for the quests, are structurally similar.

Randel Helms's analysis of quest structure in The Hobbit and The Lord of the Rings
Event	The Hobbit	The Lord of the Rings
Start	From Bag End in the Shire	
End of 1st phase	Trip down River Running, nearing Erebor	Trip down River Anduin, nearing Mordor
Approaching the goal	Cross the dragon's withered heath	Cross the evil polluted plain of Gorgoroth
Achieving the quest	Enter hole in side of the Lonely Mountain	Enter hole in side of Mount Doom
Success marked by	Arrival of Great Eagles	
Returning home	Have to stop auction of Bag End	Have to scour the Shire of Sharkey's evil

=== Gain and loss ===
The Tolkien scholar Tom Shippey notes that in The Hobbit, the Lonely Mountain is a symbol of adventure, and the "true end" of the story is the moment when Bilbo looks back from a high pass and sees "There far away was the Lonely Mountain on the edge of eyesight. On its highest peak snow yet unmelted was gleaming pale. 'So comes snow after fire, and even dragons have their ending!' said Bilbo, and he turned his back on his adventure." (Note: Tolkien 1937, ch. 18 "The Return Journey")

Amelia Harper, in the J. R. R. Tolkien Encyclopedia, writes that the mountain's history, as usual for the Dwarves, was a tale of "beauty gained and lives lost".

== Adaptations ==
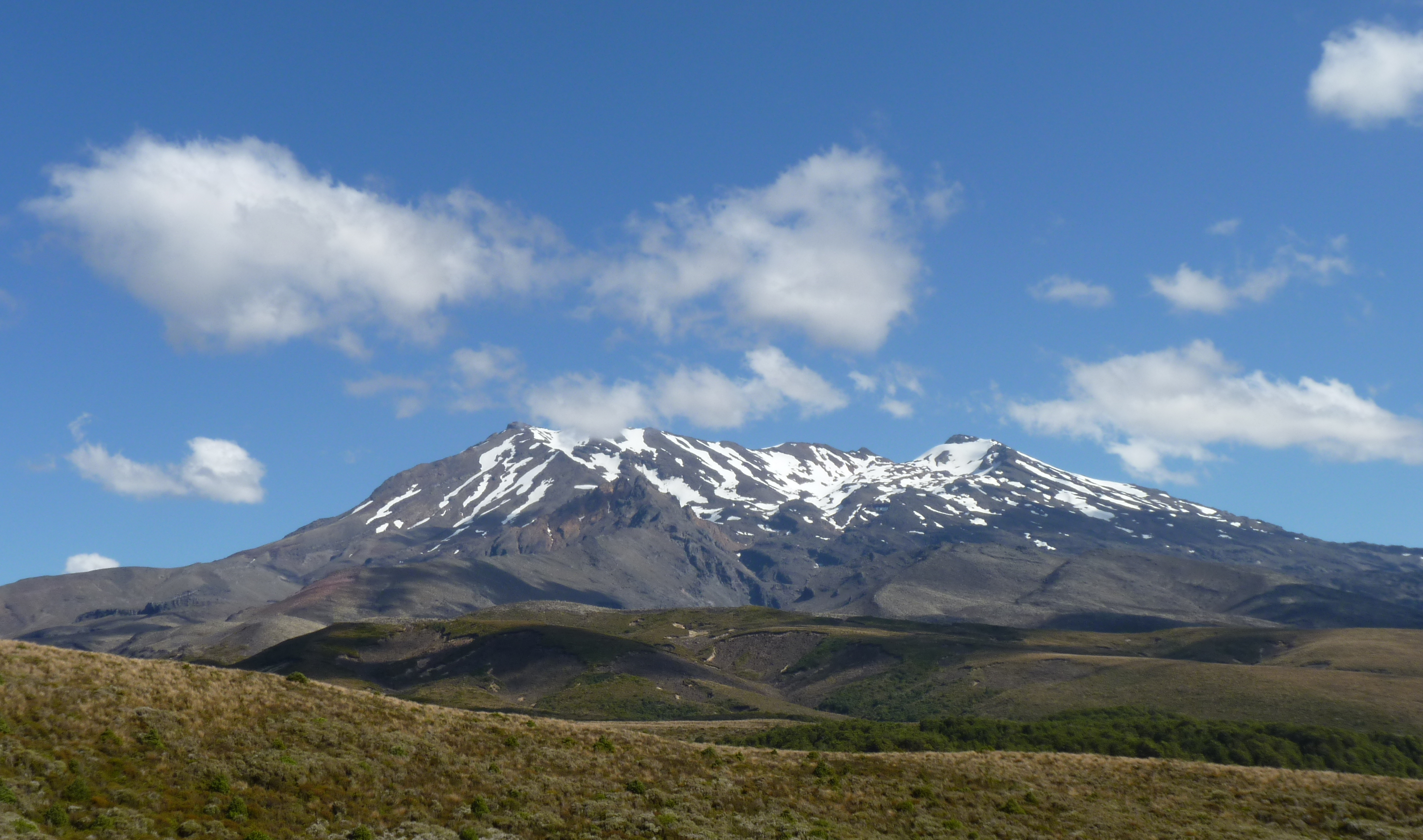
New Zealand's Mount Ruapehu stood in for the Lonely Mountain in Peter Jackson's film adaptations of The Hobbit.

The Lonely Mountain: Lair of Smaug the Dragon is a board game produced in 1985 by Iron Crown Enterprises, designed by Coleman Charlton, which features groups of adventurers, either Dwarves, Elves, Orcs or Men entering Smaug's Lair to capture his treasure before he awakens.

"Erebor", specifically the southern spurs of the Mountain and Dale, is a playable map in The Lord of the Rings: The Battle for Middle-earth II. It has three gates, including the one Tolkien described and two which cannot be closed, to allow those playing as invading forces to easily enter the stronghold.

The Lonely Mountain appears in Peter Jackson's film adaptations of The Hobbit: An Unexpected Journey, The Desolation of Smaug, and The Battle of the Five Armies. The actual setting was Mount Ruapehu in New Zealand.
