= List of The Hobbit characters =

This article describes all named characters appearing in J. R. R. Tolkien's 1937 book The Hobbit. Creatures as collectives are not included. Characters are categorized by race. Spelling and point of view are given as from The Hobbit.

== Hobbits ==
- Bilbo Baggins of Bag End, the protagonist and titular hobbit of the story. (Note: The Hobbit, ch. 1 "An Unexpected Party")
- Bungo Baggins, Bilbo's father. (mentioned only)
- Belladonna Took, Bilbo's mother. (mentioned only)
- The Old Took, Bilbo's maternal grandfather. (mentioned only)
- Grubb, Grubb, and Burrowes, auctioneers managing the liquidation of Bilbo's effects. (Note: The Hobbit, ch. 19 "The Last Stage") Both names are connected with digging.
- The Sackville-Bagginses, acquisitive cousins to Bilbo. They are, further, snobbish and bourgeois.
- Bullroarer Took, a historical figure mentioned as the Old Took's great grand-uncle, and therefore Bilbo's great great great grand-uncle. However, according to the family tree published in Appendix C of The Lord of the Rings, where his name is Bandobras and "Bullroarer" is a nickname, he was the Old Took's grand-uncle, and therefore Bilbo's great great grand-uncle. (Note: The Return of the King, App. C "Family Trees") The name Bandobras appears in the abandoned 1960 revision of The Hobbit. (mentioned only)

== Wizards ==
- Gandalf, the mastermind behind The Hobbit's quest.
- Radagast, a wizard mentioned as a "cousin" of Gandalf. (Note: The Hobbit, ch. 7 "Queer Lodgings") (mentioned only)

== Dwarves ==
- Thrain the Old, ancestor of Thorin and first King under the Mountain, finder of the Arkenstone. (mentioned only)
- Thror, grandfather of Thorin, King under the Mountain when it was conquered by Smaug. Killed by Azog in Moria. (mentioned only)
- Thrain, father of Thorin, whom Gandalf found witless and wandering in the dungeons of the Necromancer. (mentioned only)
- Dain son of Nain, a cousin of Thorin, comes to the aid of Thorin's Company at the Battle of Five Armies, leading more than 500 dwarves. (Note: The Hobbit, ch. 15 "An Unexpected Party"; ch. 17 "The Clouds Burst")

=== Thorin's Company ===
Thorin's Company consisted of the following thirteen dwarves. Their quest in The Hobbit is the main impetus of the plot. (Note: All of the dwarves are introduced in chapter one, where their hood colours and instruments are also given.) Their quest was joined by Bilbo Baggins (the titular hobbit) and occasionally by the wizard Gandalf. Tolkien took the names of Gandalf and 12 of the 13 dwarves – excluding Balin – from the Old Norse Völuspá.

- The Royal House of Durin:
  - Thorin Oakenshield, leader of the Company and hereditary claimant of the kingdom of the Lonely Mountain. He possessed the longest beard in the Company, and wore a gold belt and a sky-blue hood with a large silver tassel. Thorin played the harp.
  - Fili and Kili, sons of Thorin's sister. (Note: The Hobbit, ch. 18 "The Return Journey") The youngest dwarves in the Company and therefore useful for their keen eyesight. They wore blue hoods and grew yellow beards.
- Four of Thorin's third-cousins – two pairs of brothers:
  - Balin. Older brother to Dwalin. He wore a red hood and had a white beard. Bilbo and Balin later became good friends. Balin returns to Bag End to visit Bilbo after the main events in The Hobbit.
  - Dwalin. Younger brother to Balin. He wore a dark green hood and a golden belt, had a blue beard tucked into the belt, and, like his brother Balin, he played the viol. He was the first of the dwarves that Bilbo met.
  - Oin. Brother to Gloin. He wore a brown hood. He and Gloin were charged with starting the campfires.
  - Gloin. Brother to Oin. He wore a white hood. He and Oin were charged with starting the campfires. Gloin openly doubted Bilbo at the start of the quest. Gloin was the father of the character Gimli in The Lord of the Rings. (Note: The Fellowship of the Ring, Bk. 2, ch. 2 "The Council of Elrond")
- Three dwarves who were Thorin's remote kinsmen:
  - Dori. He wore a purple hood. Dori was tasked with carrying Bilbo in the goblin tunnels. He also played the flute.
  - Nori. He wore a purple hood. He also played the flute.
  - Ori. He wore a grey hood. He also played the flute.
- Three dwarves who were "descended from the Dwarves of Moria but were not of Durin's line": (Note: The Return of the King, App. A III "Durin's Folk")
  - Bifur. Cousin to Bofur and Bombur. He wore a yellow hood and played clarinet.
  - Bofur. Brother to Bombur and cousin to Bifur. He wore a yellow hood and played clarinet.
  - Bombur. Brother to Bofur and cousin to Bifur. His primary traits were his fatness and his sympathy for Bilbo's plights. He wore a pale green hood.

== Elves ==
- Elrond, master of Rivendell, the Last Homely House East of the Sea. The Hobbit calls him an elf-friend rather than an elf, one "who had both elves and heroes of the North for ancestors." (Note: The Hobbit, ch. 3 "A Short Rest"; ch. 19 "The Last Stage")
- The Elvenking, king of the Mirkwood Elves. He held the dwarves captive. They were eventually freed by Bilbo. (Note: The Hobbit, ch. 8 "Flies and Spiders") (In The Hobbit he is only called "the Elvenking"; his name "Thranduil" is given in The Lord of the Rings. (Note: The Fellowship of the Ring, Bk. 2, ch. 2 "The Council of Elrond"))
- Galion, the butler of the Elvenking's halls, whose fondness for wine enables Bilbo and the dwarves to escape. (Note: The Hobbit, ch. 9 "Barrels Out of Bond")

== Men ==
- Bard the Bowman, an archer of Lake-town who slew Smaug. Heir of Girion. (Note: The Hobbit, ch. 14 "Fire and Water")
- Beorn the "skin-changer", able to take the form of a bear, who lives between the Misty Mountains and Mirkwood, near the Carrock. He fought against the goblins at the Battle of Five Armies along with the men, elves and dwarves. Beorn may not have been a man; Gandalf states in The Hobbit that he believes the story calling Beorn "... a man descended from the first men who lived before Smaug or the other dragons came into this part of the world" rather than the other common story, that "he is a bear descended from the great and ancient bears of the mountains that lived there before the giants came". In The Lord of the Rings, they refer to his kind as Beornings. (Note: The Fellowship of the Ring, Bk. 2, ch. 1 "Many Meetings")
- Girion, Lord of Dale until it was destroyed by Smaug; his wife and child escaped. (mentioned only)
- The Master of Lake-town, (Note: The Hobbit, ch. 10 "A Warm Welcome") a grasping politician who met his end starving in the wilderness with the wealth he plundered from his own people after the destruction of Lake-town. He is not named explicitly but had the nickname "Moneybags". Balin mentions his successor "the new Master" when he visits Bilbo.

== Trolls ==
- Tom, one of the three trolls who captured the members of the Company. The trolls argued over how to prepare their captives for eating, goaded on by the impersonating voice of Gandalf. They argued until dawn, when the sun's rays turned them to stone. (Note: The Hobbit, ch. 2 "Roast Mutton") (In The Lord of the Rings, the location of this scene is identified as the Trollshaws. (Note: The Fellowship of the Ring, Bk. 1, ch. 12 "Flight to the Ford"; also map of Middle-earth))
- Bert, one of the three trolls who captured the members of the Company.
- William (Bill Huggins), one of the three trolls who captured the members of the Company. "Huggins", unlike "Baggins", is a real surname, meaning "Hugh's son", in a diminutive form.

== Singular characters ==
- Gollum, a creature left largely to mystery in The Hobbit. He lived alone deep under the Misty Mountains on an island in a dark, cold lake. He lost his magic ring, which Bilbo found, and engaged Bilbo in a riddle game in order to stall for time. Ultimately Bilbo escaped with the ring. (Note: The Hobbit, ch. 5 "Riddles in the Dark") In The Lord of the Rings, it is revealed that Gollum is a degenerate hobbit of great age whose name was originally Sméagol. (Note: The Fellowship of the Ring, Bk. 1, ch. 2 "The Shadow of the Past")
- The Necromancer, a shadowy evil character mentioned in The Hobbit. (Note: The Hobbit, ch. 1 "An Unexpected Party"; ch. 19 "The Last Stage") In The Lord of the Rings, the Necromancer is revealed to be Sauron. (Note: The Fellowship of the Ring, Bk. 1, ch. 2 "The Shadow of the Past") (mentioned only)
- Smaug, a great dragon who made the Lonely Mountain his lair. After the Company roused him from his long quiescence, he destroyed Lake-town and was killed by Bard the Bowman.

== Birds ==
- The Lord of the Eagles, a giant eagle who, with the other eagles, bore the Company away from the burning treetops the goblins had trapped them in, (Note: The Hobbit, ch. 6 "Out of the Frying-Pan into the Fire"; ch. 7 "Queer Lodgings") and who aided the allies at the Battle of Five Armies. (Note: The Hobbit, ch. 17 "An Unexpected Party"; ch. 18 "The Return Journey")
- Carc, an intelligent raven who lived upon the Ravenhill beneath the Lonely Mountain in the days of King Thror. (Note: The Hobbit, ch. 15 "The Gathering of the Clouds") (mentioned only)
- Roäc, son of Carc; the leader of the great ravens of the Lonely Mountain.
- The thrush, whose knocking announced the revelation of the keyhole, (Note: The Hobbit, ch. 11 "On the Doorstep") and who carried news of Smaug from the Lonely Mountain to Bard.

== Goblins ==
- Azog, father of Bolg, (Note: The Hobbit, ch. 17 "The Clouds Burst") who killed Thror in Moria. (mentioned only)
- Bolg, who succeeded the Great Goblin, led an army of goblins in the Battle of Five Armies.
- Golfimbul, king of the goblins of Mount Gram, killed by Bullroarer Took at the Battle of the Green Fields. (mentioned only)
- The Great Goblin, whose kingdom lies under the Misty Mountains. Warriors of his realm waylay the Company and take them prisoner. Gandalf kills the Great Goblin when he rescues the Company. (Note: The Hobbit, ch. 4 "Over Hill and Under Hill")
