= Balin (Middle-earth) =

Fictional character created by J.R.R. Tolkien

- Middle-earth character

In-universe information
- Alias: Lord of Moria
- Race: Dwarf
- Book(s): The Hobbit (1937); The Fellowship of the Ring (1954); Unfinished Tales (1980)

Balin is a fictional character in J. R. R. Tolkien's world of Middle-earth. A Dwarf, he is an important supporting character in The Hobbit, and is mentioned in The Fellowship of the Ring. As the Fellowship travel through the underground realm of Moria, they find Balin's tomb and the Dwarves' book of records, which tells how Balin founded a colony there, becoming Lord of Moria, and that he and his companions were killed when the colony was overrun by orcs.

Balin featured in the 1977 Rankin/Bass animated film of The Hobbit; in Peter Jackson's 2012–2014 live-action film series, where he is portrayed by Ken Stott; and in the 2003 video game adaptation where he is voiced by Victor Raider-Wexler.

== Literature ==
The Company of the Ring stood silent beside the tomb of Balin. Frodo thought of Bilbo and his long friendship with the Dwarf, and of Balin's visit to the Shire long ago. In that dusty chamber in the mountains it seemed a thousand years ago and on the other side of the world...

... in them were large iron-bound chests of wood. All had been broken and plundered; but beside the shattered lid of one there lay the remains of a book. It had been slashed and stabbed and partly burned, and it was so stained with black and other dark marks like old blood that little of it could be read...

At last Gandalf looked up. 'It seems to be a record of the fortunes of Balin's folk', he said. 'I guess that it began with their coming to Dimrill Dale nigh on thirty years ago...'

— J. R. R. Tolkien, The Fellowship of the Ring, "The Bridge of Khazad-Dûm"

=== Early life ===
Balin was born in Erebor, the son of Fundin. In the year Balin turned seven, Erebor was sacked by the dragon Smaug, and the Dwarves went into exile. During that period his younger brother Dwalin was born. Their father Fundin was killed in the Battle of Azanulbizar. Balin and his brother settled in the Blue Mountains with their surviving family. Balin and Dwalin were among those who set out with Thráin II in an attempt to return to Erebor, but they lost Thráin under the eaves of Mirkwood. After many days of fruitless searching, they returned to the Blue Mountains. (Note: Tolkien 1955, Appendix A)

=== The Hobbit ===
Balin was a member of Thorin Oakenshield's company of Dwarves who travelled with Bilbo Baggins and Gandalf in the Quest of Erebor, on which the plot of The Hobbit centres. His brother Dwalin and he were the first to arrive at Bilbo's house at the beginning of The Hobbit. He played a viol. He was among those who had been at the Mountain before the dragon came. He had been 7 years old while Thorin had been 24 on that day, making him the second-eldest of the Dwarves in the company. (Note: Tolkien 1937, ch. 1 "An Unexpected Party")

Tolkien describes Balin as "their look-out man": he spotted Bilbo approaching the Green Dragon Inn at Bywater, saw the trolls' fire in the Trollshaws, (Note: Tolkien 1937, ch. 2 "Roast Mutton") and was the first to see the elves in Mirkwood. (Note: Tolkien 1937, ch. 8 "Flies and Spiders") After they escaped the goblins in the Misty Mountains, Balin as look-out for the company failed to notice Bilbo (made invisible by wearing his magic ring), and after this incident he came to respect Bilbo's abilities as a burglar. (Note: Tolkien 1937, ch. 6 "Out of the Frying-Pan into the Fire") Balin served as the de facto spokesman for the party after the Elvenking imprisoned the Dwarves, as they did not at first realise that Thorin had been captured with them as well. (Note: Tolkien 1937, ch. 9 "Barrels Out of Bond")

In the course of the Quest, Balin was the Dwarf who developed the closest friendship with Bilbo. He was the only one who offered to look for Bilbo after he had gone down the secret Erebor passage. (Note: Tolkien 1937, ch. 12 "Inside Information") Some years after the Quest, he and Gandalf visited Bilbo at Bag End, where Balin told of the mountain's glory restored in the years after the Battle of the Five Armies. (Note: Tolkien 1937, ch. 19 "The Last Stage")

=== The Lord of the Rings ===
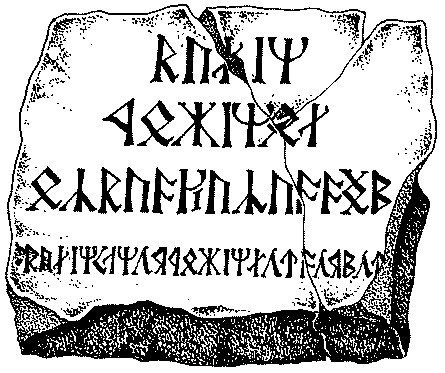
An artist's rendition of Balin's tomb. The runic inscription reads "Balin Son of Fundin, Lord of Moria".

In The Fellowship of the Ring, one of the Dwarves of Thorin's company, Glóin tells the Council of Elrond that Balin had left Erebor and ventured to reclaim Moria with a company of Dwarves including Óin and Ori (two of his companions from the Quest of Erebor), and Flói, Frár, Lóni, and Náli. The fate of Balin's colony was uncertain, as no word had come from Moria in many years. (Note: Tolkien 1954a, book 2, ch. 2 "The Council of Elrond") The Fellowship (which included Balin's cousin, Glóin's son Gimli) later happened upon Balin's tomb in the Chamber of Mazarbul, and learnt of his fate from the Dwarves' book of records, the Book of Mazarbul. It told how Balin discovered Durin's Axe, and established a small colony, but it was overrun by orcs and Balin was killed by an orc archer in Dimrill Dale. Thus he died in the same place as his father, having been self-proclaimed Lord of Moria for less than five years. Balin's tomb was inscribed "Balin Fundinul Uzbad Khazad-Dûmu", with smaller runes beneath giving the translation into English (as the representation of Tolkien’s invented language of Westron): "Balin, son of Fundin, Lord of Moria". (Note: Tolkien 1954a, book 2, ch. 5 "The Bridge of Khazad-dûm")

== Analysis ==
The first page from The Book of Mazarbul, a facsimile artefact created by Tolkien to support the story of Balin's death.

The Tolkien scholar John D. Rateliff writes that Balin is the only Dwarf of Thorin's company whose name does not come directly from the Old Norse poem Völuspá, part of the Poetic Edda. The name appears in Sir Thomas Malory's Middle English prose tale Le Morte d'Arthur, but in Rateliff's view Sir Balin is not nearly as likeable a character.

The Tolkien scholar Tom Shippey notes that in the final scene of The Hobbit, Balin, Bilbo, and Gandalf discuss the connection between prophecy, individual action, and truth. Balin states that the new master of Dale is wise and popular, and the people "are making songs which say that in his day the rivers run with gold." They agree that "after a fashion", the metaphors can indeed be true, that in Shippey's words "romance and reality are differences of presentation not of fact".

When Balin leaves, disastrously, to seek his fortune in Moria, "a shadow of disquiet" came over the Dwarves, as Glóin reports to the Council of Elrond. Shippey writes that the metaphor of the shadow is ominous, and ambiguous: it could mean simple earthly discontent, or it could mean a spell from Mordor: "maybe Balin simultaneously fell [made his own choice] and was pushed [bewitched]."

Tolkien expended enormous effort on constructing a facsimile Book of Mazarbul to resemble the burnt, torn volume abandoned at Balin's tomb, carefully staining and tearing the paper and burning in the burn-marks to make it as authentic as possible. However, his publisher Allen & Unwin chose not to include his artwork in the first edition, prompting Tolkien to remark that without it the text at the start of "The Bridge of Khazad-Dûm" was "rather absurd". (Note: Carpenter 2023, #141 to Allen & Unwin, 9 October 1953)

== Adaptations ==
Ken Stott as a "visually distinctive" Balin in Peter Jackson's film series The Hobbit

Don Messick voiced Balin in Rankin/Bass's 1977 animated version of The Hobbit.

In Jackson's live-action film series of The Hobbit, Balin is portrayed by Ken Stott as reluctant to go on the quest for old gold, whether or not the dragon had stolen it from Balin's ancestors. As such, he is sympathetic to Bilbo, who appears quite unsuitable for the task he is being given.

In the 2003 video game adaptation Balin is voiced by Victor Raider-Wexler.

== Family tree ==
Durin's Folk, showing the Dwarvish tendency to have few children (and fewer daughters) (Note: Tolkien 1955, Appendix A, part 3, "Durin's Folk") (Note: Names in italics in the family tree are Thorin and his company from The Hobbit.)

Durin I	Dwarves of Moria
Durin VI
Náin I
Thráin I
Thorin I
Glóin
Óin
Náin II
Dáin I	Borin
Frór	Thrór	Grór	Farin
Thráin II	Náin	Fundin	Gróin
Dís (♀)	Thorin II; Oakenshield	Dáin II; Ironfoot	Dwalin, Balin	Glóin	Óin	Ori, Dori, Nori	Bifur, Bofur, Bombur
Fili, Kili	Thorin III; Stonehelm	Gimli
Durin VII
