= Moria, Middle-earth =

Underground complex in Middle-earth

Moria
- 'The Lord of the Rings' location
- Durin's emblem, as on Moria's West-gate

In-universe information
- Other name: Khazad-dûm
- Type: Greatest city of the Dwarves, subterranean realm, labyrinth
- Ruled by: Kings of Durin's Folk (to T.A. 1981); Durin's Bane, Azog; Balin; Durin VII
- Geography: Central Misty Mountains
- Lifespan: Years of the Trees – T.A. 1981; Fourth Age
- Founder: Durin

In the fictional history of the world by J. R. R. Tolkien, Moria, also named Khazad-dûm, is an ancient subterranean complex in Middle-earth, comprising a vast labyrinthine network of tunnels, chambers, mines, and halls under the Misty Mountains, with doors on both the western and the eastern sides of the mountain range. Moria is introduced in Tolkien's novel The Hobbit, and is a major scene of action in The Lord of the Rings.

In much of Middle-earth's history, Moria was the greatest city of the Dwarves. The city's wealth was founded on its mines, which produced mithril, a fictional metal of great beauty and strength, suitable for armour. The Dwarves dug too greedily and too deep for mithril, and disturbed a demon of great power: a Balrog, which destroyed their kingdom. By the end of the Third Age, Moria had long been abandoned by the Dwarves, and was a place of evil repute. It was dark, in dangerous disrepair, and in its labyrinths lurked Orcs and the Balrog.

Scholars have identified likely sources for Tolkien's Moria: he had studied a Latin inscription about a lost ring at the temple of Nodens in Gloucestershire, at a place called Dwarf's Hill full of old mine-workings. The name Moria, Tolkien wrote, echoed the name of a castle in a Norwegian folktale, while Gandalf's death and reappearance reminded critics of the resurrection and transfiguration of Jesus. The West Gate that the Watcher in the Water crashes closed behind the Fellowship recalled to commentators the Wandering Rocks of Greek mythology, and Odysseus's passage between the devouring Scylla and the whirlpool Charybdis. Finally, the Fellowship's entry into the darkness via the deadly lake by the West Gate, and its exit into the light via the beautiful Mirrormere, alongside Gandalf's death and reappearance, has been compared to a baptism, a ceremony that combines a symbolic death and the gift of new life.

Moria provided dramatic scenes in Peter Jackson's film The Lord of the Rings: The Fellowship of the Ring, inspired by Alan Lee's illustrations. Its multiple levels of tunnels and halls have served, too, as the basis for a variety of computer and board games.

== Names ==
The name "Moria" means "the Black Chasm" or "the Black Pit", from Sindarin mor, "dark, black" and iâ, "void, abyss". (Note: Carpenter 2023, letter #297 draft to Mr Rang, August 1967) The element mor had the sense "sinister, evil", especially by association with infamous names such as Morgoth and Mordor; indeed Moria itself had an evil reputation by the times in which The Hobbit and The Lord of the Rings are set. The name Moria had (within the fiction) originally applied only to the Black Chasm itself. However, after the Dwarves were forced to abandon Khazad-dûm, its many lamps went out, and the whole subterranean complex became dark. Tolkien borrowed the name Moria itself, but not its meaning, from a book he had read.

Khazad-dûm is the name of the fabulous city-kingdom of the Dwarves, especially in a historical or nostalgic context. In the fictional history, Khazad-dûm was Moria's original name, given by the Dwarves in their own language, Khuzdul. It is rendered (in "translated Westron") as the Dwarrowdelf, an archaic form of what would be the Dwarves' delving in more modern English. Tolkien rhymes dûm with "tomb". (Note: Tolkien 1954a, book 2, ch. 4 "A Journey in the Dark")

== Tolkien's account ==
=== Geography ===
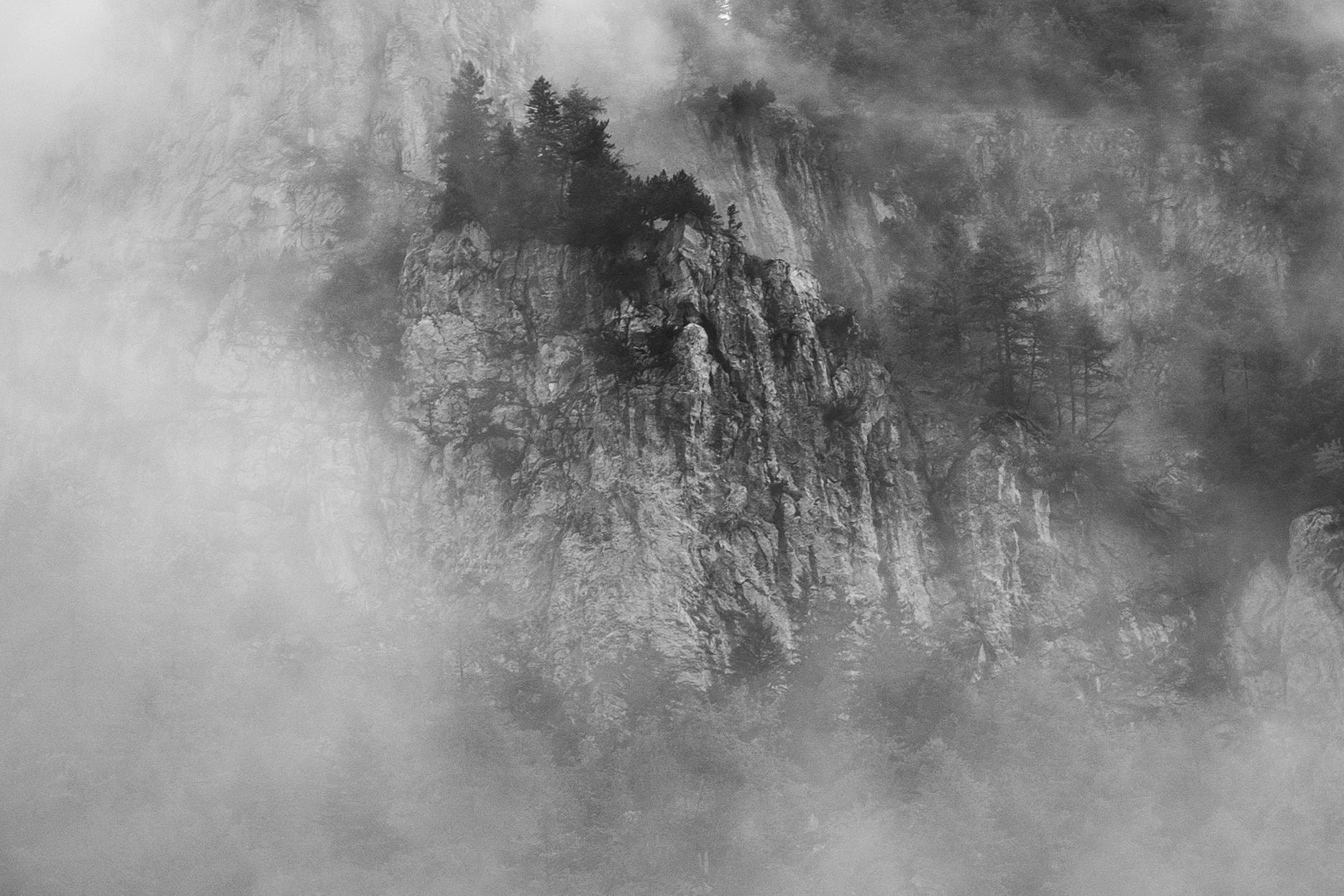
Mist on the Alps: Tolkien's experiences on his 1911 visit gave him the idea for difficulties crossing the Misty Mountains. (Note: Carpenter 2023, letter #306 to Michael Tolkien, October 1968)

Moria was originally a system of natural caves located in Dimrill Dale, a valley on the eastern side of the Misty Mountains. The appearance of the Misty Mountains, and some of the experiences of Tolkien's protagonists, were inspired by his travels in the Swiss Alps in 1911.

The caves led to the Black Chasm, a subterranean abyss, some fifty feet wide and of indeterminate depth, which was crossed only by Durin's Bridge, "a slender bridge of stone, without kerb or rail". It forced any group wishing to cross to go in single file, limiting the power of any attack. (Note: Tolkien 1954a, book 2, ch. 5 "The Bridge of Khazad-dûm")

Moria lay on the western edge of the Middle-earth region of Wilderland. The Mountains of Moria, three of the Misty Mountains' most massive peaks, surrounded Dimrill Dale: Silvertine on the west, Redhorn on the north, and Cloudyhead on the east – in Sindarin respectively Celebdil, Caradhras and Fanuidhol. Their Khuzdûl names, respectively Zirakzigil, (Note: In early editions, the name was mostly hyphenated, as Zirak-zigil, but by 2004 Christopher Tolkien had established that his father preferred the unhyphenated form.) Barazinbar and Bundushathûr, are mentioned by Gimli, as the Fellowship nears Moria. The caves of Moria, where the Dwarf city-kingdom of Khazad-dûm was founded, were situated under Silvertine; their mouth overlooked Dimrill Dale, which contained many waterfalls and a long, oval lake that reflected stars even in daylight. Perceiving these stars as a crown glittering above his head, Durin took this as an auspicious sign, named the lake Kheled-zâram, the Mirrormere, and chose the eastward-facing caves above it for his new stronghold. (Note: Tolkien 1954a, book 2, ch. 6 "Lothlórien")

=== Geology ===
The Dwarves excavated most of Khazad-dûm out of solid rock, leaving polished walls. Minerals included gold, gems and iron ore. However, the principal mineral was mithril, a fabulously precious and versatile metal found nowhere else in Middle-earth. It was the source of Khazad-dûm's huge wealth, but ultimately its mining was the cause of its downfall. Beginning under the Silvertine, the Dwarves mined ever deeper, and down towards the roots of Mount Caradhras. There they unearthed the Balrog, which drove the Dwarves into exile.

Far below even the deepest mines of the Dwarves lay a primordial underworld of tunnels, streams and lakes in perpetual darkness, inhabited by primitive creatures. The tunnels were "gnawed by nameless things" from the beginnings of Arda, (Note: Tolkien 1954, book 3, ch. 5 "The White Rider") and, as Gandalf suggested, from this underworld the Watcher in the Water may have emerged.

=== History ===
Moria was founded by Durin at the end of the Ages of the Stars. During his reign, the precious metal mithril was discovered in the mines, and some of the major structures of Moria were built: Durin's Bridge, the Second Hall, the Endless Stair and Durin's Tower. Durin died before the end of the First Age. He was buried in the royal tombs of Khazad-dûm. (Note: Tolkien 1955, Appendix A: III "Durin's Folk") Orcs constantly attacked the dwarf kingdom; men and dwarves fought together against the orcs. (Note: Tolkien 1996, part 2 ch. 10 "The Shibboleth of Fëanor") The dwarves became friendly with the Elves of Eregion to the west; the Elves assisted in developing Khazad-dûm's mansions, making it "far more beautiful" as it grew westwards through tunnels to the West Gate, (Note: Tolkien 1980, part 2 ch. 4 "Concerning Galadriel and Celeborn") which opened on to Eregion. Celebrimbor, the Lord of Eregion, used ithildin lettering on this gate on behalf of its builder, his friend the dwarf smith Narvi.

In the Second Age, Rings of Power were made by elves in Eregion. Durin III, the King of Khazad-dûm at the time, obtained one of the rings; another was Nenya, made from Moria's mithril; it became Galadriel's ring. When the elves discovered that Sauron, the Dark Lord had made the One Ring, giving him control of all the other rings, the War of the Elves and Sauron broke out. Sauron conquered Eregion, but Khazad-dûm's intervention enabled Elves including Elrond and Celeborn to escape Eregion's destruction and found Rivendell. Khazad-dûm was closed, and its population dwindled. At the end of the Second Age, Khazad-dûm fought Sauron in the War of the Last Alliance, helping to defeat him. (Note: Tolkien 1977, "Of the Rings of Power and the Third Age")

In the Third Age, the more easily accessible seams of mithril were exhausted, and the Dwarves dug deeper until they disturbed a Balrog, a powerful fire-demon. It killed King Durin VI, acquiring the name Durin's Bane, and then Náin I, his son. The Dwarves abandoned Khazad-dûm and fled into Wilderland.

Orcs occupied Moria, while the Balrog haunted its depths. The Orc-chieftain Azog became the master of Moria. Thrór, the heir of the Dwarf-kings of Khazad-dûm, attempted to enter his people's ancestral home, and was killed by Azog. The Dwarves gathered their forces for three years before launching the War of the Dwarves and Orcs in TA 2793. The war culminated in the Battle of Nanduhirion before the east gate of Moria six years later. The Dwarves defeated the Orcs and Azog was beheaded by Dáin Ironfoot. But the victory was Pyrrhic, and the Dwarves did not dare attempt to re-enter Moria and face the Balrog. Despite not knowing the true nature of the Balrog, Dain knew that its power was greater than that of the Dwarf army. Much later, Balin left Erebor to recolonize Moria, but after five years his colony was destroyed by Orcs. (Note: Tolkien 1954a, book 2, ch. 2 "The Council of Elrond")

As the War of the Ring loomed, a messenger from Sauron offered Dáin the return of Moria and three Dwarf-Rings if he helped Sauron to find the One Ring. Dáin refused, sending Glóin and his son Gimli to the Council of Elrond, starting the quest of the Fellowship of the Ring.

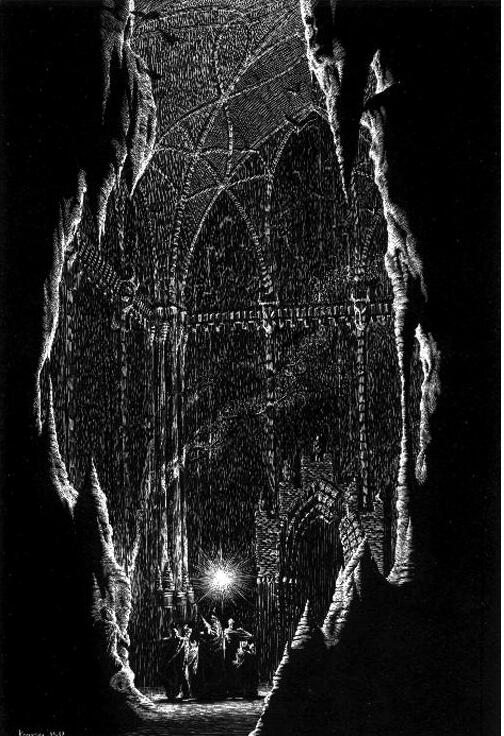
The Fellowship of the Ring in Moria. Scraperboard illustration by Alexander Korotich, 1981

The Fellowship reluctantly passed through Moria in winter, gambling that most of its Orcs had been killed in the Battle of Five Armies. They were attacked by the monstrous Watcher in the Water as they entered the West-gate, and faced further perils in the subterranean passages. They reached the Chamber of Mazarbul, the ancient repository of documents holding Balin's tomb and his colony's chronicle, the Book of Mazarbul. They were attacked there by a Troll and many Orcs, before being approached by the Balrog. Gandalf confronted the Balrog on Durin's Bridge. The two duelled briefly before plunging together into the chasm, allowing the rest of the Fellowship to escape to the Eastern Gates.

Unknown to the Fellowship, Gandalf climbed to the top of Mount Celebdil and continued to fight the Balrog for two days in the Battle of the Peak; both died, but Gandalf returned to Middle-earth as Gandalf the White.

Khazad-dûm lay empty. Some centuries into the Fourth Age, the auspiciously-named Durin VII, a descendant of Dáin Ironfoot, succeeded as the King of the Longbeards and heir of the Kings of Khazad-dûm. (Note: Tolkien 1996, "The Making of Appendix A", (iv) "Durin's Folk") He led his people back to Khazad-dûm, where they remained "until the world grew old and the Dwarves failed and the days of Durin's race were ended".

=== Architecture ===
The city of Khazad-dûm had many levels, linked by flights of stone steps. There were at least six levels above the Great Gates, and many more levels —or Deeps— below it. Every level consisted of a network of arched passages, chambers and many-pillared halls, often with "black walls, polished and smooth as glass". Below the level of the Gates lay treasuries, armouries, dungeons, and mines. The Endless Stair of many thousands of steps rose in an unbroken spiral from the lowest dungeon of Moria to Durin's Tower at the summit of Celebdil; it was destroyed in the battle between Gandalf and the balrog, Durin's Bane.

During the kingdom of Khazad-dûm, the subterranean realm was "full of light and splendour", illuminated by many "shining lamps of crystal". The higher levels had skylights carved through the mountain-side which provided daylight. The East-gate or the Dimrill Gate was the main entrance, looking over Dimrill Dale. It opened into the First Hall of Moria. The West-gate enabled travellers to pass right through the Misty Mountains, thus providing a weather-free alternative to the notorious and arduous Redhorn Pass, 15–20 miles to the north. The J. R. R. Tolkien Encyclopedia notes that Middle-earth gates are important both symbolically and practically: "They mark exclusion or admission. They test character and wisdom. They suggest mystery, secrecy, and privilege."

==== Doors of Durin ====
Tolkien's illustration of the Doors of Durin, with Sindarin inscription in Tengwar script

The Doors of Durin, also called the West-gate or the West-door, formed the western entrance to Moria. When shut, the gates were invisible and impossible to open by physical means. They were however decorated with designs engraved in ithildin made by the elf-Lord Celebrimbor of Eregion and the dwarf Narvi from mithril mined in Moria. The designs included the emblems of Durin, the two trees of the High Elves, and the Star of the House of Fëanor. Tolkien's drawing of the designs on the Doors of Durin was the only illustration in The Lord of the Rings during his lifetime (other than cover-art and calligraphy). In moonlight, a password made the designs visible. The designs contained a second password to open the doors. When the Fellowship entered, the Watcher in the Water, the aquatic guardian of the gates, slammed the doors shut with its tentacles, plunging the Fellowship into darkness. (Note: Tolkien 1954, book 2, ch. 4 "A Journey in the Dark") (Note: Carpenter 2023, #137 to Rayner Unwin, 11 April 1953)

The inscription was in the Elvish language of Sindarin, using the Tengwar script; Gandalf translates it as "The Doors of Durin, Lord of Moria. Speak, friend, and enter. I, Narvi, made them. Celebrimbor of Hollin drew these signs." Scholars have commented that "Moria", an unfriendly Elvish description meaning "The Black Pit", was hardly how a ruler of Khazad-Dûm would choose to describe his realm; and that since the name was not used until the Balrog was awakened in the Third Age, it was also anachronistic. Possible resolutions have been proposed: that Celebrimbor had foresight of the name; that the magic lettering reshaped itself; or that Gandalf indeed saw the Sindarin name "Hadhodrond" on the door, and read it out as "Moria" for the benefit of those listening (and in the same way, he must have seen "Eregion" and read out "Hollin").

== Origins ==
=== Nodens ===
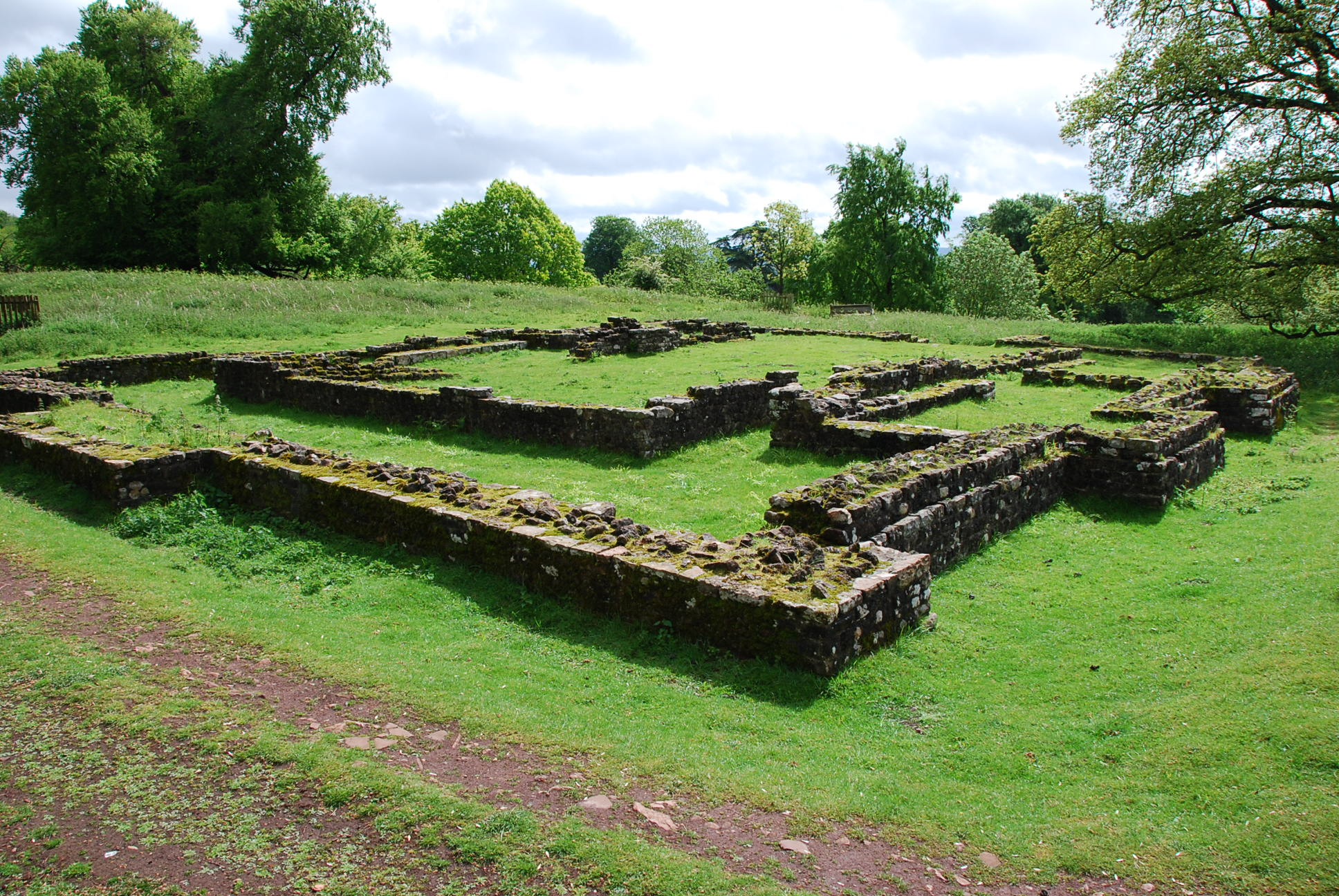
Tolkien visited the temple of Nodens at a place called "Dwarf's Hill" and translated an inscription with a curse upon a ring. It may have inspired his dwarves, mines, rings, and Celebrimbor "Silver-Hand", an Elven-smith who contributed to Moria's building.

In 1928, a 4th-century pagan mystery cult temple was excavated at Lydney Park, Gloucestershire. Tolkien was asked to investigate a Latin inscription there: "For the god Nodens. Silvianus has lost a ring and has donated one-half [its worth] to Nodens. Among those who are called Senicianus do not allow health until he brings it to the temple of Nodens." An old name for the place was Dwarf's Hill, and in 1932 Tolkien traced Nodens to the Irish hero Nuada Airgetlám, "Nuada of the Silver-Hand". (Note: Tolkien, J. R. R., "The Name Nodens", Appendix to "Report on the excavation of the prehistoric, Roman and post-Roman site in Lydney Park, Gloucestershire", Reports of the Research Committee of the Society of Antiquaries of London, 1932; also in Tolkien Studies: An Annual Scholarly Review, Vol. 4, 2007) The Tolkien scholar Tom Shippey thought this "a pivotal influence" on Tolkien's Middle-earth, combining as it did a god-hero, a ring, dwarves, and a silver hand. The J. R. R. Tolkien Encyclopedia notes also the "Hobbit-like appearance of [Dwarf's Hill]'s mine-shaft holes", and that Tolkien was extremely interested in the hill's folklore on his stay there, citing Helen Armstrong's comment that the place may have inspired Tolkien's "Celebrimbor and the fallen realms of Moria and Eregion". The scholar of English literature John M. Bowers notes that the name of the Elven-smith Celebrimbor is the Sindarin for "Silver Hand" and that "because the place was known locally as Dwarf's Hill and honeycombed with abandoned mines, it naturally suggested itself as background for the Lonely Mountain and the Mines of Moria."

=== Norwegian Folktales ===
Moria first appeared in Tolkien's 1937 novel The Hobbit. Tolkien later recalled that the name was "a casual 'echo' of Soria Moria Castle in one of the Scandinavian tales translated by Dasent. ... I liked the sound-sequence; it alliterated with 'mines', and it connected itself with the MOR element in my linguistic construction." The tales translated by Dasent were from the 1852 collection Norwegian Folktales. A historic source is the Poetic Edda, with which Tolkien was familiar; the protagonist in the Skírnismál notes that his quest will involve misty mountains, orcs, and giants.

== Analysis ==
The Tolkien scholar Jane Chance observes that the fall of the dwarves, first those of Durin, then those of Balin, is brought about through avarice, their greed for Moria's deeply-buried mithril. She identifies this as "their internal vice", which the Balrog "monstrously projects". Chance notes further that Balin meets his death at the lake Mirrormere, "a very dark mirror in which he is blind to himself."

The scholar Clive Tolley notes that the contest between the wizard Gandalf and the evil Balrog on Durin's Bridge somewhat recalls a shamanistic contest but that a far closer parallel is medieval vision literature, giving the example of St Patrick's Purgatory and even Dante's Divine Comedy.

Scholars such as Chance and Jerram Barrs have recognised the death of Gandalf the Grey (at the hands of the Balrog), and his reappearance as Gandalf the White, as a transfiguration, the change in colour hinting at "a parallel with Christ's own death and resurrection".

The professor of English literature Sue Zlosnik notes that the fantasy world in Tolkien's invented mythology for England is constructed with elaborate detail. She cites Humphrey Carpenter's biographical account of Tolkien's "painstaking crafting" of The Book of Mazarbul that appears in Moria, complete with "burnt and tattered" pages, and Tolkien's disappointed wish for a facsimile of this artefact to appear in the first edition of Fellowship of the Ring. In Zlosnik's view, this sort of detail recalls Horace Walpole's love of the "Gothic".

Erin Derwin, writing in The Artifice, compares the fellowship's time in Moria with Siegfried Sassoon's First World War poem "The Rear-Guard", in which he describes "groping along the tunnel" in a labyrinth of dark trenches, with "muttering creatures underground", recalling, Derwin suggests, the awakening of the Orcs and the Balrog by the hobbit Pippin.

The scholar of English literature Charles A. Huttar compares this "clashing gate" that crashed shut behind the travellers to the Wandering Rocks that in Greek mythology lie near the opening of the underworld, Hades, and, along with the monstrous Watcher in the Water, to Odysseus's passage between the devouring Scylla and the whirlpool Charybdis.

The first page from The Book of Mazarbul, artwork created by Tolkien to support the story. The publishers did not include it in the first edition of The Lord of the Rings. (Note: Carpenter 2023, #141 to Allen & Unwin, 9 October 1953)

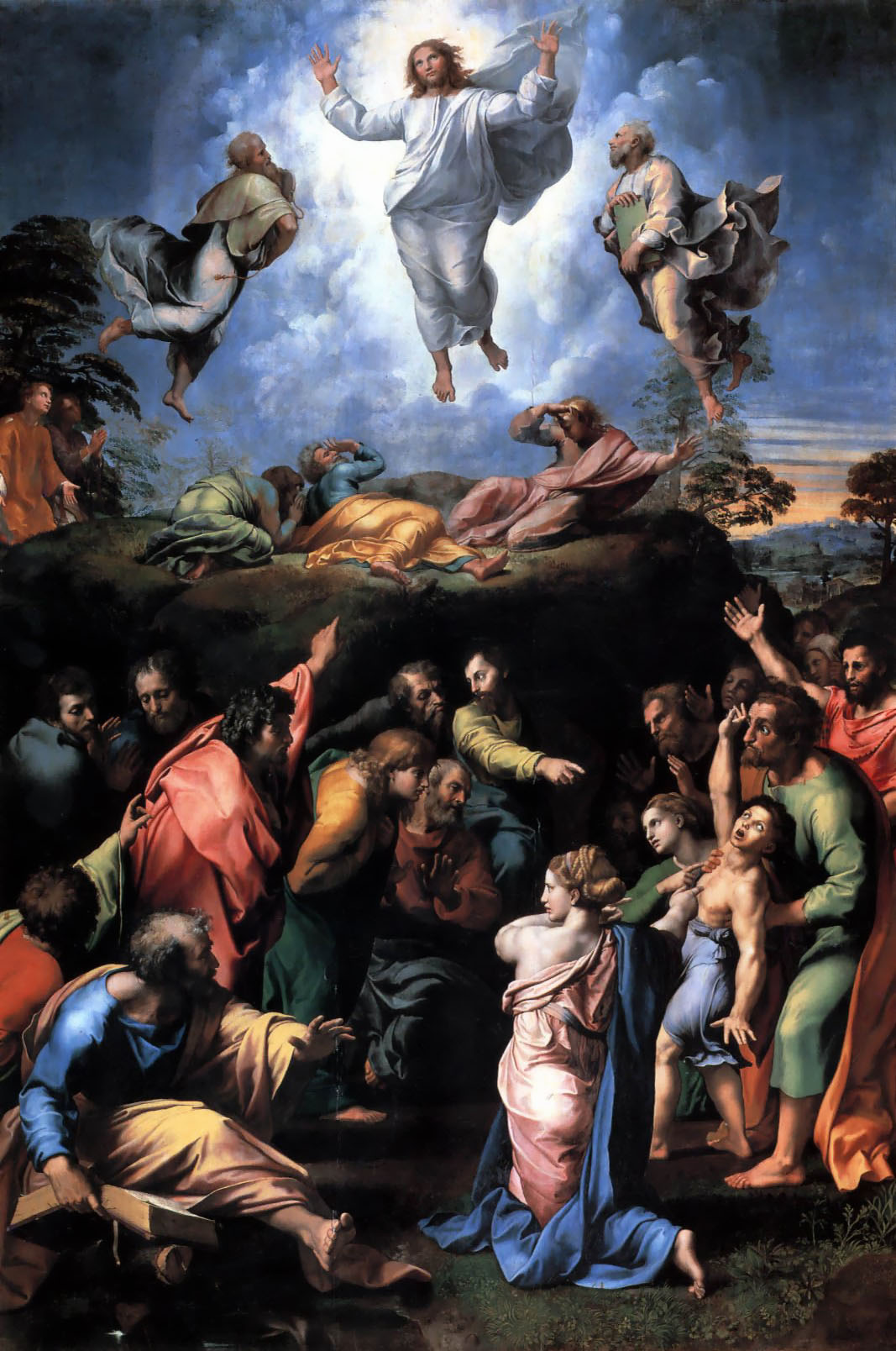
Scholars such as Jane Chance have compared Gandalf's death in Moria and subsequent reappearance as "the White" to Christ's Transfiguration, as in this painting by Raphael, c. 1520.

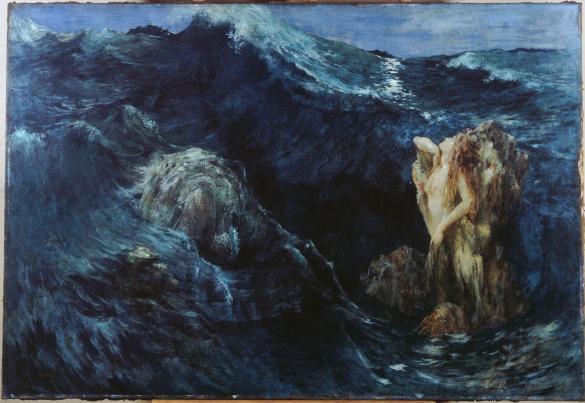
Gateway to Hell: the Fellowship's passage through the West-gate has been compared to Odysseus's passage between the devouring Scylla and the whirlpool Charybdis. Painting by Ary Renan, 1894

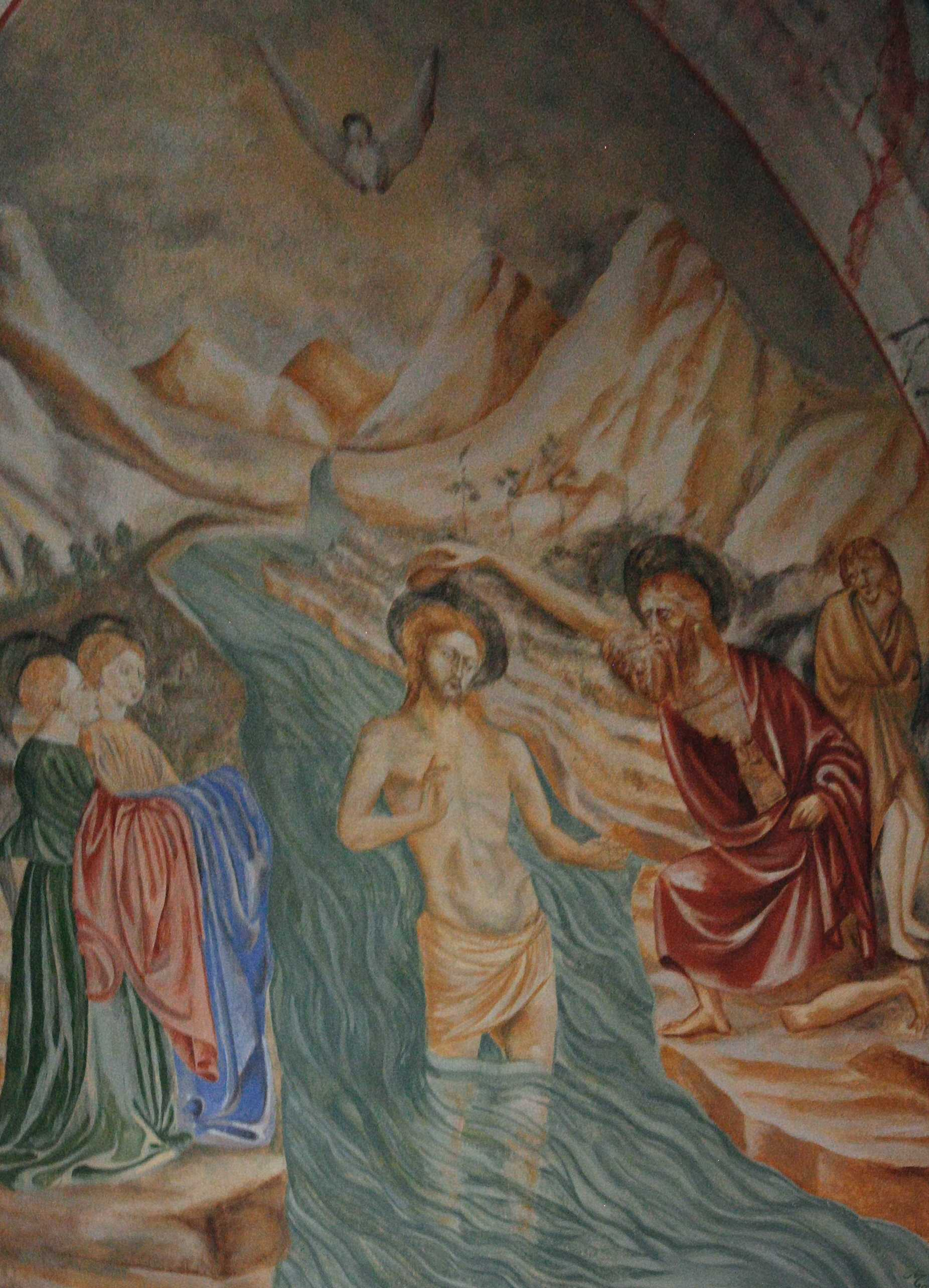
Matthew Dickerson writes that Moria, symbolising both Tomb and Womb, can be seen as a place of Baptism. Detail of painting by Jean Bozia, 1825

Matthew Dickerson, writing in The J. R. R. Tolkien Encyclopedia, suggests that of all the caves, barrows, tunnels and underground kingdoms in Tolkien's writings, Moria is "the most significant". He writes that these dark places, home to many of the major events in the stories, from the Paths of the Dead to Gollum's various tunnels and the Glittering Caves of Aglarond serve as symbols of darkness and death, the Tomb, or of fertility and new life, the Womb. Moria, he argues, citing Hugh Keenan's description of the two contrasting lakes at the Fellowship's entrance and exit from Moria, and giving the example of Gandalf's death and rebirth, functions as both Womb and Tomb. In Christianity, he notes, Baptism is at once a symbolic death and the gift of new life.

Matthew Dickerson's analysis of Moria's symbolism
"Tomb"	"Womb"
Baptism
Gandalf falls to his death in the Black Chasm	Gandalf is reborn as "the White"
Entrance lake: Monstrous Watcher in the Water offers death	Exit lake: Beautiful Mirrormere (Kheled-Zaram) offers life

Tolkien was asked whether the name Moria meant the biblical mountains of Moriah, where Abraham was to sacrifice his son, Isaac. Tolkien wrote that his mind did not work that way, explaining that Moria meant "Black Chasm" in Sindarin, the root Mor occurring in Mordor, Morgoth, Morgul. He went on "As for the 'land of Morīah' (note stress): that has no connection (even 'externally') whatsoever."

== Adaptations ==
=== Film ===
Jackson's depiction of the underground halls of Moria was largely inspired by Alan Lee's illustration.

Peter Jackson's portrayal of Moria in his The Lord of the Rings: The Fellowship of the Ring movie was mostly inspired by Alan Lee's illustrations. Lee worked as the project's conceptual artist in New Zealand throughout the making of the film trilogy. Moria was modelled for the film at 1/12 scale.

=== Games ===
The roguelike computer game Moria was modelled on The Lord of the Rings events. The goal in the game is to reach the bottom of a maze-like simulation of the Mines of Moria and kill a Balrog.

Moria is featured in board games such as Reiner Knizia's Lord of the Rings.

The first expansion pack of the MMORPG The Lord of the Rings Online named Mines of Moria takes place almost entirely in Moria, which has several levels. The uppermost is the path of Durin's Way, which pierces the mountain to reach the cliffs of Zirak-Zigil. The main levels of Moria span from the Doors of Durin to Dolven-View, Zelem-Melek, Nud-Melek and the East doors, known as the First Hall. Further down in the subterranean realm are the Silvertine Lodes and the Redhorn Lodes, and the furthest depths contain the submerged Water-Works, the fiery Flaming Deeps, and the Foundations of Stone, where Gandalf and the Balrog fought before ascending the Endless Stair.

=== Music ===
The Dutch composer Johan de Meij wrote a movement in his Symphony No. 1 "The Lord of the Rings" called "Journey in the Dark", that was directly inspired by Moria. The movement is split into two sections, "The Mines of Moria" and "The Bridge of Khazad-dûm", and it depicts the events that take place there in The Fellowship of the Ring (novel).
