= Charles A. Huttar =

American academic (born 1932)

Charles A. Huttar is an emeritus professor of English at Hope College, known for his work on the Inklings including J. R. R. Tolkien, C. S. Lewis, Owen Barfield, and Charles Williams. He has twice won the Mythopoeic Society's Scholarship Award.

== Biography ==
Charles Adolph Huttar was born in 1932. He was educated at Wheaton College, and gained his PhD at Northwestern University in 1956. He became a professor of English literature at Hope College in 1966, retiring from there in 1996.

He is a longtime member of the Conference on Christianity and Literature and the Guild of Scholars of the Episcopal Church. He has written numerous papers on the Oxford literary group the Inklings, including J. R. R. Tolkien, C. S. Lewis, Owen Barfield, and Charles Williams. In addition, he studied medieval and early modern literature.

== Awards and distinctions ==
- 1992 Mythopoeic Society's Scholarship Award
- 1997 Mythopoeic Society's Scholarship Award

== Books ==
- 1971 Imagination and the Spirit: Essays in Literature and the Christian Faith Presented to Clyde S. Kilby
- 1991 Word and Story in C. S. Lewis (co-edited) ISBN 9781556355875
- 1996 The Rhetoric of Vision: Essays on Charles Williams (co-edited) ISBN 0838753140
- 2005 Scandalous Truths: Essays by and about Susan Howatch (Bloomsbury Academic) ISBN 9781575910963
