= Dragons in Middle-earth =

Race from J. R. R. Tolkien's legendarium

Dragons

In-universe information
- Created by: Morgoth (Melkor)
- Creation date: First Age
- Home world: Middle-earth
- Base of operations: Ered Mithrin, Withered Heath, Lonely Mountain
- Sub-races: Fire-drakes; Cold-drakes

J. R. R. Tolkien's Middle-earth legendarium features dragons based on those of European legend, but going beyond them in having personalities of their own, such as the wily Smaug, who has features of both Fafnir and the Beowulf dragon.

Dragons appear in the early stories of The Book of Lost Tales, including the mechanical war-dragons of The Fall of Gondolin. Tolkien went on to create Smaug, a powerful and terrifying adversary, in The Hobbit. Dragons are only mentioned in passing in The Lord of the Rings.

Tolkien's conception of the dragon has been adopted both in games loosely based on his Middle-earth writings, and by other fantasy authors. Several taxa, both extinct and living, have been named after Tolkien's dragons, including species of girdled lizards, shield bugs, and ants which have been named Smaug.

== Development ==
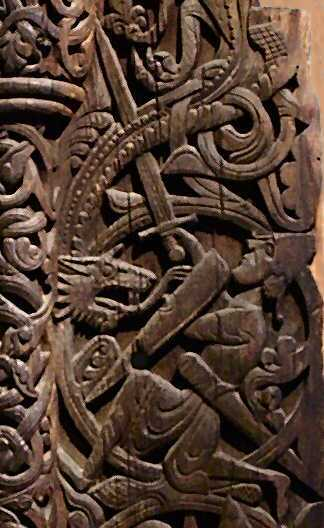
Sigurd kills the dragon Fafnir. Wood-carving in Hylestad Stave Church, 12th–13th century. Smaug resembles Fafnir in several respects.

Dragons are already present in The Book of Lost Tales. Tolkien had been fascinated with dragons since childhood. (Note: Tolkien, J. R. R. (1947), On Fairy-Stories, Unwin Paperbacks (1975), p. 44; ISBN 0 04 820015 8) As well as "dragon", Tolkien called them "drake" (from Old English draca, in turn from Latin draco and Greek δράκων), and "worm" (from Old English wyrm, "serpent", "dragon"). (Note: Tolkien 1984b, ch. 2 "Turambar and the Foalókë") Tolkien named four dragons in his Middle-earth writings. Like the Old Norse dragon Fafnir, they are able to speak, and can be subtle of speech. In the earliest drafts of "The Fall of Gondolin", the Lost Tale that is the basis for The Silmarillion, the Dark Lord Morgoth (here called Melkor) sends mechanical war-machines in the form of dragons against the city; some serve as transport for Orcs. These do not appear in the published Silmarillion, edited by Christopher Tolkien, in which real dragons attack the city. As in the later conception of the dragons in the Legendarium, the winged dragons had not yet been devised by Morgoth at the time of the Fall of Gondolin. The first winged dragons appeared at the same time as Ancalagon the Black. In the late Third Age, the dragons bred in the Northern Waste and Withered Heath north of the Grey Mountains. (Note: Tolkien 1955, Appendix B, "The Third Age")

== Characteristics ==
In Tolkien's works, dragons are quadrupedal, and may be either flightless, like Scatha (Note: Tolkien 2024, no. 177: "Scatha the Worm") and Glaurung, or winged, like Smaug. Winged dragons first appeared during the War of Wrath, the battle that ended the First Age. (Note: Tolkien 1977, ch. 24 "Of the Voyage of Eärendil and the War of Wrath") Some dragons, known as "Fire-drakes" ("Urulóki" in Quenya), are capable of breathing fire. It is not entirely clear whether the "Urulóki" were only the first dragons such as Glaurung that could breathe fire but were wingless, or to any dragon that could breathe fire, and thus include Smaug. (Note: Tolkien 1977, ch. 13 "Of the Return of the Noldor") In Appendix A of The Lord of the Rings, Tolkien mentions that Dáin I, King of the Dwarves, and his son Frór were killed by a "Cold-drake", prompting their people to leave the Grey Mountains. (Note: Tolkien 1955, Appendix A, "Durin's Folk") It is commonly assumed that this indicates a dragon which could not breathe fire. Dragon-fire (even that of Ancalagon the Black) is described as not being hot enough to melt the One Ring; however, four of the Dwarven Rings are consumed by Dragon-fire. (Note: Tolkien 1954a, book 1, ch. 2 "The Shadow of the Past") All Tolkien's dragons share a love of treasure (especially gold), subtle intelligence, immense cunning, great physical strength, and a hypnotic power called "dragon-spell". They are extremely powerful and dangerous but mature very slowly. Because of this, Melkor's first attempts to use them against his enemies failed, as they were not yet powerful enough to be useful in battle.

== Named dragons ==
Tolkien named only four dragons in his Middle-earth writings. Another, Chrysophylax Dives, appears in Farmer Giles of Ham, a story separate from the Middle-earth corpus. Chrysophylax is a fire-breathing dragon, described as "cunning, inquisitive, greedy, well-armoured, but not over bold".

=== Glaurung ===
Glaurung, first introduced in The Silmarillion, is described as the Father of Dragons in Tolkien's legendarium, and the first of the Urulóki, the Fire-drakes of Angband. He is a main antagonist in The Children of Húrin, in which he sets in motion events that bring about the protagonist Túrin Turambar's eventual suicide before being slain by him. (Note: Tolkien 2007, ch. 17 "The Death of Glaurung") Glaurung is shown to use his ability to control and enslave Men using his mind to wipe the memory of Túrin's sister Nienor, though it was restored after Glaurung had perished. He is described as having four legs and the ability to breathe fire, but no wings. (Note: Tolkien 2007, ch. 14 "The Journey of Morwen and Niënor to Nargothrond")

=== Ancalagon the Black ===
Ancalagon the Black (Sindarin: rushing jaws from anc "jaw", and alag "impetuous" (Note: Tolkien 1987, The Etymologies, pp. 348, 362)) was a dragon bred by Morgoth during the First Age, as told in The Silmarillion. He was one of Morgoth's most powerful servants, the mightiest of all dragons, and the first of the winged "fire-drakes". He arose like a storm from the pits of Angband beneath the Iron Mountains, as a last defence of the realm of Dor Daedeloth. Near the end of the War of Wrath that pitted Morgoth's armies against the army of the godlike Valar, Morgoth sent Ancalagon to lead a flight of dragons from his fortress of Angband to destroy his enemies. So powerful was the assault that the army of the Valar was driven back from the gates of Angband. Eärendil in his airborne ship Vingilot, aided by Thorondor and his great Eagles, battled Ancalagon's dragons for an entire day. At length Eärendil gained the upper hand, throwing Ancalagon down on the peaks of Thangorodrim, destroying both Ancalagon and the towers. With his last and mightiest defender slain, Morgoth was defeated and made captive, thus ending the War of Wrath.

=== Scatha ===
Scatha was a mighty "long-worm" of the Grey Mountains. (Note: Tolkien 1955, Appendix A, "The House of Eorl") In a poem, Scatha was a "blind and cold…wingless drake" capable of freezing people "with fear and his cold breath". Little is known of Scatha except that he was slain by Fram in the early days of the Éothéod, the ancestors of the Riders of Rohan. Scatha's name was likely taken from Anglo-Saxon sceaða, "injurious person, criminal, thief, assassin". (Note: Tolkien, J. R. R. (1967), Nomenclature of The Lord of the Rings, in Wayne G. Hammond & Christina Scull (2005), The Lord of the Rings: A Reader's Companion, HarperCollins, p. 762; ISBN 0 00 720308 X) After slaying Scatha, Fram's ownership of his recovered hoard was then disputed by the Dwarves of that region. Fram rebuked this claim, sending them instead Scatha's teeth, with the words, "Jewels such as these you will not match in your treasuries, for they are hard to come by." This led to his death in a feud with the Dwarves. The Éothéod retained at least some of the hoard, and brought it south with them when they settled in Rohan. The silver horn that Éowyn gave to Merry Brandybuck after the War of the Ring, crucial in The Scouring of the Shire, came from this hoard.

=== Smaug ===
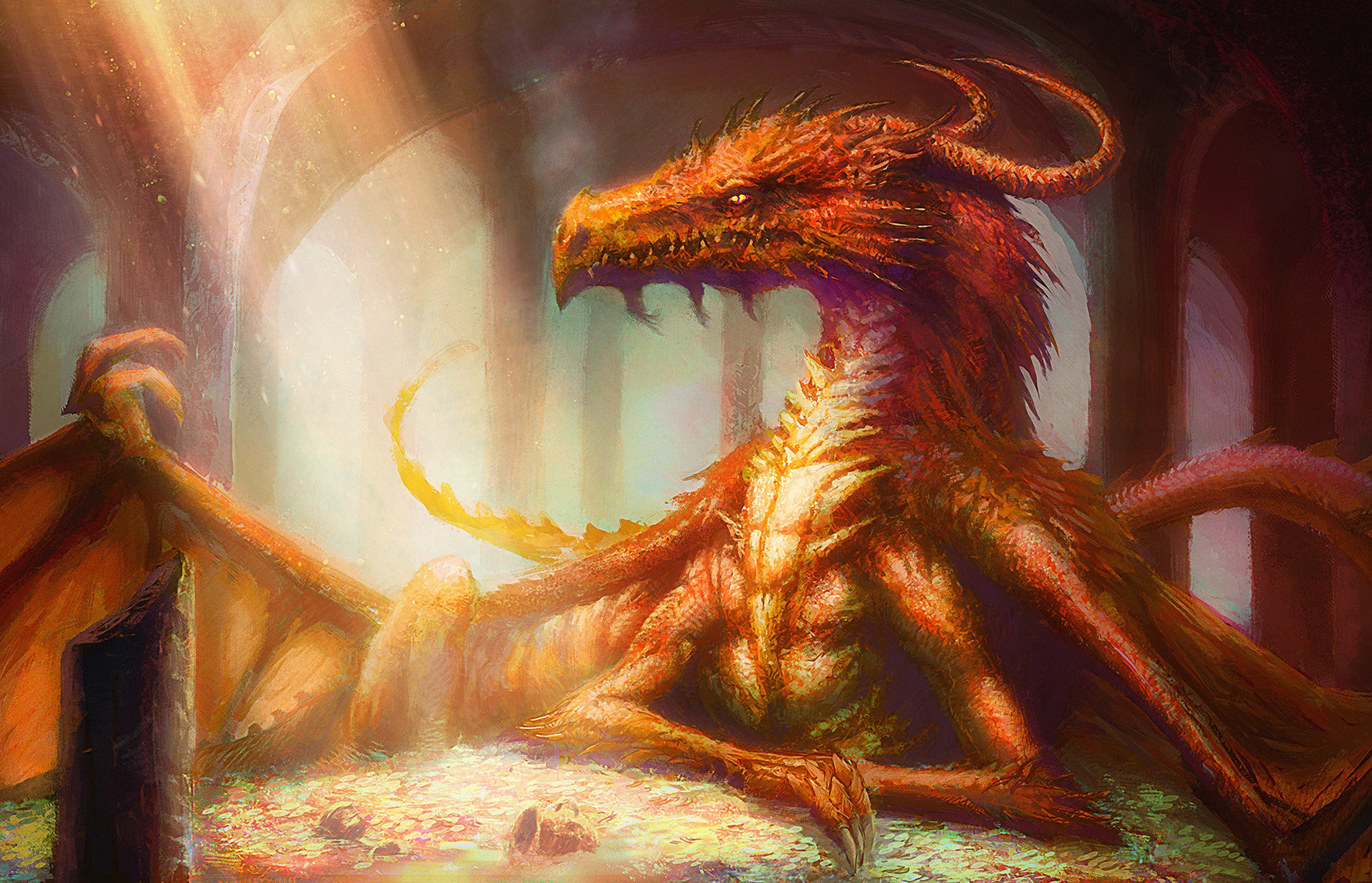
Smaug in fan art

Smaug was the last named dragon of Middle-earth. He was slain by Bard, a descendant of Girion, Lord of Dale. A deadly winged fire-breathing dragon, he was red-gold in colour and his underbelly was encrusted with many gemstones from the treasure-pile he commonly slept upon once he had taken control of Erebor (the Lonely Mountain). The Arkenstone was buried right in the pile he slept on, but Smaug never noticed it. Smaug had only a single weakness: there was a hole in his jewel encrusted underbelly on his left breast area. The hobbit Bilbo Baggins discovered this weakness, and the information led to Smaug's death above Esgaroth. (Note: Tolkien 1937, ch. 14 "Fire and Water" and throughout)

== Analysis ==
Tolkien's dragons were inspired by medieval stories, including those about Fafnir in Germanic mythology and the Beowulf dragon. The folklorist Sandra Unerman writes that Smaug's ability to speak, the use of riddles, the element of betrayal, his enemy's communication via birds, and his weak spot could all have been inspired by the talking Germanic dragon Fafnir of the Völsunga saga. Łukasz Neubauer writes that Tolkien's friend C. S. Lewis was similarly inspired by Fafnir. He compares the two men's use of dragons in their mythologies, noting that Tolkien's usage is both more visible and better documented.

The scholar of Icelandic literature Ármann Jakobsson writes that with the encounter with Smaug, the story in The Hobbit becomes "more unexpected, entangled, ambiguous, and political". He argues that Tolkien was effectively translating the subtext of his Old Norse sources, creating in his dragon a far more subtle, uncanny, and frightening monster than those in the earlier, more or less unconnected, travel narrative episodes.

The use of dragons as an allegorical device lasted until the early 20th century. Tolkien makes clear that he prefers the actual dragon, draco (just meaning "dragon" in Latin), to any kind of abstract or moralising usage, which Tolkien names draconitas. The Tolkien scholar Thomas Honegger notes that Tolkien pointed out that "a 'good dragon' is a beast that displays the typical characteristics of draco without becoming a mere allegorical representative of draconitas (the vice of avarice)." In Honegger's view, Tolkien's innovation, seen best in Smaug, is his creation of "a distinct 'dragon personality'". Whereas Glaurung is a mythical element, and Ancalagon is merely ferocious, Smaug and Chrysophylax Dives "go beyond both the 'primitive' draco ferox ("fierce dragon") of myths and legends as well as the whimsical draco timidus ("timid dragon") of contemporary children's literature." Thus, Honegger concludes, Tolkien's "good dragons" admit their mythical ancestry but are at the same time recognisably modern characters.

== Legacy ==
When Iron Crown Enterprises gained the licensing rights for games made from Tolkien's books, they expanded the selection of named dragons beyond the Middle-earth canon in both Middle-earth Role Playing and The Wizards, a trading card game set in Middle-earth. In the real-time strategy game The Lord of the Rings: The Battle for Middle-earth II, based on Peter Jackson's film trilogy, there is a dragon named Drogoth. In The Lord of the Rings: War in the North, players encounter the dragon Úrgost.

Honegger writes that Tolkien's conception of dragons "as intelligent beings with a distinct personality" has been adopted by fantasy authors with a wide range of styles, including Barbara Hambly, Ursula K. Le Guin, Anne McCaffrey, Christopher Paolini, and Jane Yolen.
