= Lego The Lord of the Rings =

Lego theme

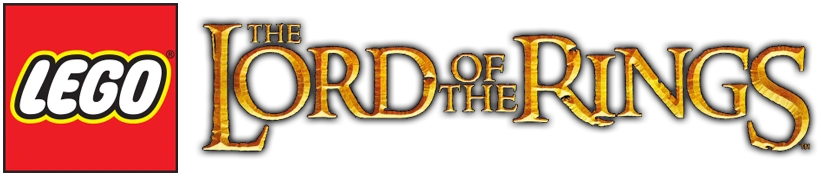
- Subject: The Lord of the Rings
- Licensed from: Warner Bros., New Line Cinema and Metro-Goldwyn-Mayer (The Hobbit only)
- Availability: 2012-2015, 2023–present
- Total sets: 44
- Characters: Frodo Baggins, Gandalf the Grey, Aragorn "Strider" Elessar II, Samwise Gamgee (Sam), Arwen Undómiel, Gimli, Peregrin Took (Pippin), Meriadoc Brandybuck (Merry), Legolas Greenleaf, Saruman the White, Elrond, Boromir, Bilbo Baggins, Gollum, Éomer, Théoden, Gríma Wormtongue, Lurtz, Haldir, The Mouth of Sauron, Galadriel, Thorin Oakenshield II, Balin, Dwalin, Kíli, Fíli, Dori, Nori, Ori, Óin, Glóin, Bifur, Bofur, Bombur, The Goblin King, Yazneg, Smaug, Necromancer, Bard the Bowman, Tauriel, Thranduil, Master of Lake-town, Beorn, Radagast the Brown. Azog the Defiler, Bain and Witch-King
- Official website

Lego The Lord of the Rings (stylized as LEGO The Lord of the Rings) is a Lego theme based on The Lord of the Rings film trilogy directed by Peter Jackson and the novel by J. R. R. Tolkien. It is licensed from Warner Bros., New Line Cinema and Metro-Goldwyn-Mayer (The Hobbit only). The theme was first introduced in 2012. The first sets appeared in 2012, to coincide with a release of the video game Lego The Lord of the Rings. Subsequent sets based on The Hobbit film trilogy would also be released and the video game Lego The Hobbit was released in 2014. The product line was discontinued by the end of 2015. Later, the theme was relaunched in January 2023 with three new sets released as the part of the Lego BrickHeadz theme. In February 2023, The Lego Group unveiled a new Rivendell set that released on 8 March 2023 as the part of the Lego Icons theme. Further, a Barad-Dûr set released on 1 June 2024, also as part of the Icons theme.

== Overview ==
Lego The Lord of the Rings was based on The Lord of the Rings film trilogy. The product line focuses on the fictional world of Middle-earth, the films follow the hobbit Frodo Baggins as he and the Fellowship embark on a quest to destroy the One Ring, to ensure the destruction of its maker, the Dark Lord Sauron. The Fellowship eventually splits up and Frodo continues the quest with his loyal companion Sam and the treacherous Gollum. Meanwhile, Aragorn, heir in exile to the throne of Gondor, along with Legolas, Gimli, Boromir, Merry, Pippin and the wizard Gandalf, unite to rally the Free Peoples of Middle-earth in the War of the Ring in order to aid Frodo by distracting Sauron's attention.

In November 2012, Lego The Hobbit was based on The Hobbit film trilogy. The product line focuses on the tale of Bilbo Baggins, who is convinced by the wizard Gandalf to accompany thirteen Dwarves, led by Thorin Oakenshield, on a quest to reclaim the Lonely Mountain from the dragon Smaug. In addition, The Lego Group built a life-sized model of the Hobbit home of Bilbo Baggins as it appears in The Hobbit: An Unexpected Journey film.

In May 2013, Rich-K and Big J had designed a Helm's Deep model contained a total of 150,000 Lego bricks and 1,700 mini-figures that based on The Lord of the Rings film trilogy.

In December 2013, Alice Finch and David Frank had designed The Rivendell model contained a total of 200,000 Lego bricks that based on The Lord of the Rings film trilogy.

== Development ==
Lego The Lord of the Rings and Lego The Hobbit was inspired by The Lord of the Rings and The Hobbit film trilogy. The Lego construction toy range was based on the film trilogy and developed in collaboration with Warner Bros. Consumer Products. The construction sets were designed to recreate the story and characters of the film trilogy in Lego form.

== Launch ==
Lego The Lord of the Rings theme was launched at the American International Toy Fair in 2012 and Lego The Hobbit was launched in few months later. As part of the marketing campaign, The Lego Group released seven Lego sets based on the film.

== Characters ==
=== Lego The Lord of the Rings ===
- Frodo Baggins: A young hobbit who inherits the One Ring from his uncle Bilbo.
- Gandalf the Grey: An Istari wizard and mentor to Frodo. (Note: Gandalf also make a cameo in The Lego Movie and The Lego Movie 2: The Second Part. Voiced by Todd Hanson.)
- Aragorn "Strider" Elessar II: A Dúnedain ranger and heir to Gondor's throne.
- Samwise Gamgee (Sam): Better known as Sam, a hobbit gardener and Frodo's best friend.
- Arwen Undómiel: An elven princess of Rivendell and Aragorn's lover.
- Gimli: A dwarf warrior who accompanies the Fellowship to Mordor after they set out from Rivendell.
- Peregrin Took (Pippin): Better known as Pippin, a hobbit who travels with the Fellowship on their journey to Mordor.
- Meriadoc Brandybuck (Merry): Better known as Merry, a distant cousin of Frodo.
- Legolas Greenleaf: A prince of the elves' Woodland Realm and a skilled archer.
- Saruman the White: The fallen head of the Istari Order who succumbs to Sauron's will through his use of the palantír.
- Elrond: The Elven-Lord of Rivendell who leads the Council of Elrond, which ultimately decides to destroy the Ring.
- Boromir: A prince of the Stewards of Gondor who journeys with the Fellowship towards Mordor.
- Old Bilbo Baggins: Frodo's uncle who gives him the Ring after he decides to retire to Rivendell.
- Gollum: A wretched hobbit-like creature whose mind was poisoned by the Ring after bearing it for centuries.
- Éomer: Théoden's nephew and previous Chief Marshal of the Riddermark who was exiled by Gríma.
- Théoden: The King of Rohan, who is under Saruman's spell until Gandalf heals him so he can lead his people once more.
- Gríma Wormtongue: An agent of Saruman at Edoras, who renders Théoden incapable of decisions, and desires Éowyn.
- Lurtz: The commander of Saruman's Orc forces.
- Haldir: The leader of the Lórien Elves sent by Elrond and Galadriel to defend Helm's Deep.
- The Mouth of Sauron: Sauron's ambassador at the Black Gate.

=== Lego The Hobbit ===
- Young Bilbo Baggins: A hobbit hired by the wizard Gandalf to accompany 13 dwarves on a quest to reclaim the Lonely Mountain from the dragon Smaug.
- Gandalf the Grey: A wizard who recruits Bilbo and helps to arrange the quest to reclaim the dwarves' lost treasure in Erebor.
- Galadriel: The elven co-ruler of Lothlórien along with her husband, Lord Celeborn.
- Thorin Oakenshield II: The leader of the Company of dwarves who has set out to reclaim his birthright as King of the Lonely Mountain from Smaug.
- Balin: Dwalin's brother. He is described in the novel as "always their look-out man".
- Dwalin: Balin's brother.
- Kíli: Thorin's nephew and Fíli's younger brother.
- Fíli: Thorin's nephew and Kíli's older brother.
- Dori: Nori and Ori's brother.
- Nori: Dori and Ori's brother.
- Ori: Dori and Nori's brother.
- Óin: Gloin's brother.
- Glóin: Óin's brother.
- Bifur: Bofur and Bombur's cousin.
- Bofur: Bombur's brother and Bifur's cousin, described as "a disarmingly forthright, funny and occasionally brave Dwarf".
- Bombur: Bofur's brother and Bifur's cousin; described in the novel as fat and clumsy.
- Gollum: a wretched hobbit-like creature corrupted by the One Ring.
- The Goblin King: The king of the caverns of Goblin Town in the Misty Mountains.
- Yazneg: Azog's second-in-command.
- Smaug: An enormous, powerful and psychopathic great dragon of Middle-earth who claimed the Lonely Mountain, its vast treasures and the surrounding human areas.
- Necromancer: A mysterious sorcerer residing in Dol Guldur with the ability to summon the spirits of the dead, who is later revealed to be the Dark Lord Sauron.
- Bard the Bowman: A skilled archer living in Esgaroth and the heir of Girion, the last king of old Dale.
- Tauriel: The elven chief of the Mirkwood Guards serving under Thranduil, who develops romantic feelings towards Kili and falls in love with him.
- Thranduil: The aloof and cold-hearted Elven king of the northern part of Mirkwood (the Woodland Realm).
- Master of Lake-town: The pompous and greedy mayor of the settlement of Men at Lake-town near the Lonely Mountain.
- Legolas Greenleaf: An elf from Mirkwood and the prince of the Woodland Realm - he is Thranduil's son.
- Beorn: A skin-changer who can assume the appearance of a great black bear.
- Radagast the Brown: An Istari wizard whose wisdom is based on nature and wildlife.
- Azog the Defiler: An orc and the nemesis of Thorin Oakenshield, on whom he seeks revenge for losing his forearm and hand in battle.
- Bain: Bard's son, who is described as "confident and brave and ready to do battle if required even though he is still a boy.
- Witch-King: The lord of the Nazgûl.

== Construction sets ==
According to BrickLink, The Lego Group released a total of 17 Lego sets and promotional polybags associated with Lego The Lord of the Rings and 24 sets and promotional polybags associated with Lego The Hobbit. The product line was eventually discontinued by the end of 2014. Later, the theme was relaunched in 2023 with three new sets released as the part of the Lego BrickHeadz theme.

=== Lego The Lord of the Rings sets ===
On 16 December 2011, The Lego Group announced a partnership with Warner Bros. and New Line Cinema. It was officially announced by The Lego Group that the seven sets based on The Lord of the Rings film trilogy was released on 16 May 2012. The seven sets being released were Gandalf Arrives (set number: 9469), Shelob Attacks (set number: 9470), Uruk-Hai Army (set number: 9471), (Note: Uruk-Hai Army (set number: 9471) can combine with The Battle of Helm's Deep (set number: 9474).) Attack of Weathertop (set number: 9472), The Mines of Moria (set number: 9473), The Battle of Helm's Deep (set number: 9474) and The Orc Forge (set number: 9476). In addition to the sets, two polybag sets were released as promotions, which were Frodo with cooking corner (set number: 30210) and Uruk-Hai with ballista (set number: 30211). These included five key chains with a key chain attached to the minifigures of the Mordor Orc, Gandalf the Grey, Gimli, Frodo Baggins and Bilbo Baggins. Later, it was announced that the Lego The Lord of the Rings video game would be released on 30 October 2012 and would also include a Elrond minifigure as a free gift.

In 2013, it was announced that four sets was released on 1 June 2013. The four sets being released were The Wizard Battle (set number: 79005), The Council of Elrond (set number: 79006), Battle at the Black Gate (set number: 79007) and Pirate Ship Ambush (set number: 79008). Tower of Orthanc (set number: 10237) was an exclusive set released on 1 July 2013. The set consists of 2359 pieces with five minifigures. Each of the sets featured eight core characters, named Frodo Baggins, Gandalf the Grey, Aragorn, Samwise Gamgee (Sam), Gimli, Peregrin Took (Pippin), Meriadoc Brandybuck (Merry) and Legolas Greenleaf. A Cave Troll, Corsair Pirate, Gollum, Lurtz, Mordor Orc, Ringwraith, Soldier of the Dead, Rohan Soldier and Uruk-Hai were also introduced for each of the sets. The theme was designed primarily for children aged 8 to 14. The series acted as a thematic replacement for the popular Lego Castle theme, featuring many of the same elements. Most of the sets are similar to the Lego Castle theme. The Lego Group also used this license for the characters, starter pack and fun packs in the Lego Dimensions toys-to-life video game.

=== Lego The Hobbit sets ===
In 2012, it was officially announced by The Lego Group that the six sets based on The Hobbit film trilogy was released on 27 November 2012. The six sets being released were Riddles for the Ring (set number: 79000), Escape from Mirkwood Spiders (set number: 79001), Attack of the Wargs (set number: 79002), An Unexpected Gathering (set number: 79003), Barrel Escape (set number: 79004) and The Goblin King Battle (set number: 79010). In addition to the sets, four polybag sets were released as promotions, named Mirkwood Elf Guard (set number: 30212), Gandalf at Dol Guldur (set number: 30213), Legolas Greenleaf (set number: 30215) (Note: This polybag set is a free gift for qualify purchase of The Hobbit: The Desolation of Smaug Blu-ray.) and Lake-town Guard (set number: 30216). (Note: This polybag set only available at Toys "R" Us.)

In 2013, it was announced that four sets was released on 2 December 2013. The four sets being released were Dol Guldur Ambush (set number: 79011), (Note: Dol Guldur Ambush (set number: 79011) can combine with Dol Guldur Battle (set number: 79014).) Mirkwood Elf Army (set number: 79012), Lake-town Chase (set number: 79013) and Dol Guldur Battle (set number: 79014).

In 2014, it was announced that the Lego The Hobbit video game would be released on 8 April 2014 and would also include a Bilbo Baggins minifigure as a free gift. Later, it was announced that the four sets would be released on 18 October 2014. The four sets being released were Witch-King Battle (set number: 79015), Attack on Lake-town (set number: 79016), The Battle of Five Armies (set number: 79017) and The Lonely Mountain (set number: 79018). Each of the sets feature 15 core characters, named Bilbo Baggins, Gandalf the Grey, Thorin Oakenshield II, Balin, Dwalin, Kíli, Fíli, Dori, Nori, Ori, Óin, Glóin, Bifur, Bofur and Bombur. The Goblin King, Goblin Scribe, Warg, Mirkwood Elf Chief, Mirkwood Elf Guard, Goblin Soldier, Lake-town Guard, Mirkwood Elf, Gundabad Orc, Hunter Orc, Smaug and Gwaihir were also introduced for each of the sets. The theme was designed primarily for children aged 8 to 14.

=== Lego Games sets ===
Two board game sets were released as a part of Lego Games theme. The two board game sets were The Hobbit: An Unexpected Journey (set number: 3920) was released on 3 October 2012 and later The Battle of Helms Deep (set number: 50011) was released on 1 August 2013. The two board game sets based on The Hobbit film trilogy and The Lord of the Rings film trilogy.

==== The Hobbit: An Unexpected Journey ====
The Hobbit: An Unexpected Journey (set number: 3920) was released on 3 October 2012 as a part of Lego Games theme and based on The Hobbit film trilogy. The set consists of 389 pieces with dice, game board and 4 micro figures. The set included Lego micro figures of Gandalf the Grey, Kili the dwarf, Fili the dwarf and Dwalin the dwarf.

==== The Battle of Helms Deep ====
The Battle of Helms Deep (set number: 50011) was released on 1 August 2013 as a part of Lego Games theme and The Lord of the Rings film trilogy. The set consists of 338 pieces with dice, game board and 28 micro figures. The set included Lego micro figures of Aragorn, Haldir, Eowyn, Gimli, Legolas, King Théoden, 4 Rohirrim swordsmen, Uruk-Hai archer, 5 Uruk-Hai Berserkers, Uruk-Hai leader and 11 Uruk-hai swordsmen.

=== Lego BrickHeadz sets ===
Frodo & Gollum (set number: 40630), Gandalf the Grey & Balrog (set number: 40631) and Aragorn & Arwen (set number: 40632) were released on 1 January 2023 and based on The Lord of the Rings film trilogy as the part of the Lego BrickHeadz theme.

=== Lego Icons sets ===
Rivendell (set number: 10316) was released on the 8th of March 2023 as the part of the Lego Icons theme. The set consists of 6,167 pieces with 15 minifigures, divided in 3 sections. Lego minifigures of Frodo Baggins, Samwise Gamgee, Merriadoc "Merry" Brandybuck, Peregrin "Pippin" Took, Legolas, Gimli, Boromir, Aragorn, Elrond, Arwen, Bilbo Baggins, elves and were included. Lego Design Master, Mike Psaiki explained, "We know many of our fans have been anticipating a set like this for a long-time – but a great Lego The Lord of the Rings set is never late, it arrives precisely when it means to! It was important to us that we created something really special in this recreation of Rivendell. We aimed to add as much detail as possible and create an engaging experience throughout the build to delight fans recreating scenes or proudly displaying Elrond's home. We are really pleased with the final design and how we have brought Rivendell to life in brick form."

Lego designers Mike Psiaki, Wes Talbott, Chris Perron and Ashwin Visser discussed the development of Rivendell (set number: 10316). Psiaki said, "For the development of this, we're collaborating with Warner Brothers," and continued, "They're the ones that made the Hobbit movies, and then I'm not an expert on this, I guess they currently own the rights to the Lord of the Rings film trilogy. They were quite good to work with. They have a good understanding of the limitations and capabilities of LEGO bricks. And so a lot of the suggestions we made, they're very much on board with. They gave us access to a lot of great reference material from production – a lot of images that we could go through. So yeah, it was a super great collaboration, we didn't work directly with anyone that had done any of the production design in the original film trilogy, which could have been awesome. But they had plenty of resources for us to get what we needed to make this model as authentic as it is."

== Web shorts ==
The product line was accompanied by a series of animated short films that was released on YouTube.

=== Lego The Lord of the Rings (2012 web shorts) ===
The 4 web shorts have been released on YouTube.

#	Title	Release date	Notes
1	Lego The Lord of the Rings - Mini-movie: Part 1	August 6, 2012	Lego The Lord of the Rings animated series
2	Lego The Lord of the Rings - Mini-movie: Part 2	August 6, 2012	Lego The Lord of the Rings animated series
3	Lego The Lord of the Rings - Mini-movie: Part 3	August 6, 2012	Lego The Lord of the Rings animated series
4	Lego The Lord of the Rings - Mini-movie: Part 4	August 26, 2015	Lego The Lord of the Rings animated series

=== Lego The Hobbit (2014 web shorts) ===
The 8 web shorts have been released on YouTube.

#	Title	Release date	Notes
1	Middle-earth Motors	January 8, 2014	Lego The Hobbits stop motion series. It was created by BrotherhoodWorkshop.
2	Dwarven Dreams	March 14, 2014	Lego The Hobbits stop motion series. It was created by BrotherhoodWorkshop.
3	The Rings of Power	May 6, 2014	Lego The Hobbits animated series
4	Thorin Oakenshield Great Escape	May 22, 2014	Lego The Hobbits animated series
5	Hungry Little Hobbit™	July 15, 2014	Lego The Hobbits stop motion series
6	The Aggravation of Smaug	July 28, 2014	Lego The Hobbits stop motion series
7	Bard the Bowman The Beginning	November 20, 2014	Lego The Hobbits stop motion series
8	The Making of The Aggravation of Smaug	November 20, 2014	Lego The Hobbits stop motion series

== Video games ==
=== Lego The Lord of the Rings (2012) ===
Lego The Lord of the Rings is a Lego-themed action-adventure video game developed by Traveller's Tales, that was released on Nintendo 3DS, Nintendo DS, PlayStation Vita, Microsoft Windows, Wii, PlayStation 3, and Xbox 360. The OS X version of the game, published by Feral Interactive, was released on 21 February 2013. The Android and iOS was released on 7 November 2013.

Based on The Lord of the Rings film trilogy, the game follows the original but spoofed storylines of The Fellowship of the Ring, The Two Towers and The Return of the King, taking players through the epic story events, "re-imagined with the humour and endless variety of Lego play". The game utilises music and voice acting taken from all three films of the film trilogy. Developer Traveller's Tales has stated they toned down the slapstick humour found in other Lego-licensed titles. The game follows the events in the films; however, like the Lego Star Wars series, some scenes from the films have been altered to become more family friendly or just provide comic relief to the player.

On 1 January 2019, all digital sales of the game were halted. This was confirmed a few days later by publisher Warner Bros. Interactive. The game was later re-added to Steam on 27 April 2020. (Note: Later, it was no longer available on Steam.)

=== Lego The Hobbit (2014) ===
Lego The Hobbit is a Lego-themed action-adventure video game developed by Traveller's Tales. The game was released by Warner Bros. Interactive Entertainment on 8 April 2014 in North America, and 11 April in Europe. The game is a follow-up to Lego The Lord of the Rings based on the first two Hobbit films; An Unexpected Journey and The Desolation of Smaug. (Note: The Hobbit: The Battle of the Five Armies DLC it was cancelled.) It was released on PlayStation 3, PlayStation 4, PlayStation Vita, Xbox 360, Xbox One, Wii U, Nintendo 3DS, OS X and Microsoft Windows.

On 1 January 2019, all digital sales of the game were halted. This was confirmed a few days later by publisher Warner Bros. Interactive. The game was later re-added to Steam on 27 April 2020 and on PSN Store on 6 May 2020.

=== Lego Dimensions (2015) ===
The crossover toys-to-life game Lego Dimensions developed by Traveller's Tales features content based on the original The Lord of the Rings. A "Starter Pack" includes an additional level that recreates the events of the original film and adds Gandalf as a playable character. Additional "Fun packs" add Gollum, Shelob the Great, Legolas and Gimli as playable characters.

== Other media ==
=== Lego Ideas ===
A project based on Minas Tirith was uploaded to the Lego Ideas site on March 4, 2021, and it was created by GJC15344. The project hopes to reach 10,000 supporters in order for Lego to consider to make it into an official set. The project is based on Minas Tirith from the original The Lord of the Rings film trilogy and includes characters such as Gandalf the White, Pippin, Lord Denethor and Faramir.

== Reception ==
In November 2012, The Battle of Helm's Deep (set number: 9474) was listed as one of the Top 20 Toys for Christmas by Play.com, and The Mines of Moria (set number: 9473) was awarded "DreamToys" in the Construction category by the Toy Retailers Association.

In October 2013, Lego The Lord of the Rings video game was listed as one of the BAFTA Kids' Vote Top 10s.

In January 2021, a Lego The Lord of the Rings fan build had set the Guinness Record for the "World's Largest Mini Brick Build" with a Lego build consisting of 150 million pieces.

In September 2022, The Battle of Helm's Deep (set number: 9474), The Mines of Moria (set number: 9473), The Tower of Orthanc (set number: 10237), The Lonely Mountain (set number: 79018), The Council of Elrond (set number: 79006) and An Unexpected Gathering (set number: 79003) was listed on the "Six of the best Lego The Lord of the Rings and The Hobbit sets" by Lego fansite BrickFanatics.

Rivendell (set number: 10316) received positive reviews, described by Gizmodo as a "must have" for fans of the franchise, but criticised its price of US$500.

== See also ==
- Lego Castle
- Lego Games
- The Lego Movie
- The Lego Movie 2: The Second Part
- Lego BrickHeadz
