= The Hobbit (film series) =

2012–2014 trilogy by Peter Jackson

- Cover of The Hobbit: The Motion Picture Trilogy
- Directed by: Peter Jackson
- Screenplay by: Fran Walsh; Philippa Boyens; Peter Jackson; Guillermo del Toro
- Based on: The Hobbit by J. R. R. Tolkien
- Produced by: Carolynne Cunningham; Zane Weiner; Fran Walsh; Peter Jackson
- Starring: Ian McKellen; Martin Freeman; Richard Armitage; Benedict Cumberbatch; Evangeline Lilly; Lee Pace; Luke Evans; James Nesbitt; Ken Stott; Stephen Fry; Cate Blanchett; Ian Holm; Christopher Lee; Hugo Weaving; Elijah Wood; Orlando Bloom; Andy Serkis
- Cinematography: Andrew Lesnie
- Edited by: Jabez Olssen
- Music by: Howard Shore
- Production companies: New Line Cinema; Metro-Goldwyn-Mayer Pictures; WingNut Films
- Distributed by: Warner Bros. Pictures
- Release dates: 14 December 2012 (An Unexpected Journey); 13 December 2013 (The Desolation of Smaug); 17 December 2014 (The Battle of the Five Armies)
- Running time: 474 minutes (Theatrical edition); 532 minutes (Extended edition)
- Countries: New Zealand; United States
- Language: English
- Budget: $700–745 million
- Box office: $2.938 billion

The Hobbit is a trilogy of fantasy adventure films directed by Peter Jackson. The films are subtitled An Unexpected Journey (2012), The Desolation of Smaug (2013), and The Battle of the Five Armies (2014). The films are based on J. R. R. Tolkien's 1937 novel The Hobbit, but much of the trilogy was inspired by the appendices to his 1954–55 The Lord of the Rings, which expand on the story told in The Hobbit. Additional material and new characters were created specially for the films. The series is a prequel to Jackson's The Lord of the Rings film trilogy.

The screenplays were written by Fran Walsh, Philippa Boyens, Jackson, and Guillermo del Toro, who had been chosen to direct before his departure from the project. The films take place in the fictional world of Middle-earth, sixty years before the beginning of The Lord of the Rings and follow hobbit Bilbo Baggins (Martin Freeman), who is convinced by the wizard Gandalf the Grey (Ian McKellen) to accompany thirteen Dwarves, led by Thorin Oakenshield (Richard Armitage), on a quest to reclaim the Lonely Mountain from the dragon Smaug (Benedict Cumberbatch). The films expand upon certain elements from the novel and other source material, such as Gandalf's investigation at Dol Guldur which leads him to the Necromancer, and the heroes' pursuit by the orcs Azog and Bolg, who seek vengeance against Thorin and his kindred.

The films feature an ensemble cast that includes James Nesbitt, Ken Stott, Evangeline Lilly, Lee Pace and Luke Evans, with several actors reprising their roles from The Lord of the Rings, including Cate Blanchett, Orlando Bloom, Ian Holm, Christopher Lee, Hugo Weaving, Elijah Wood, and Andy Serkis. Other actors include Sylvester McCoy, Manu Bennett, Mikael Persbrandt, Lawrence Makoare, and Stephen Fry. Returning for production, among others, were illustrators John Howe and Alan Lee, art director Dan Hennah, cinematographer Andrew Lesnie, and composer Howard Shore, while props were again crafted by Wētā Workshop, with visual effects managed by Weta Digital.

The first film in the trilogy premiered at the Embassy Theatre in Wellington on 28 November 2012. 100,000 people lined the red carpet on Courtenay Place, and the entire event was broadcast live on television in New Zealand and streamed over the Internet. The second film of the series premiered at the Dolby Theatre in Los Angeles on 2 December 2013. The final film premiered at the Odeon Leicester Square in London on 1 December 2014. The series received mixed reviews, being widely considered as inferior to Jackson's The Lord of the Rings films, but was a financial success and became one of the highest-grossing film series of all time, grossing over $2.9 billion worldwide. It was nominated for various awards and won several, although not as many as the original trilogy.

== Films ==
=== An Unexpected Journey ===
Before his 111th birthday, (Note: As depicted in The Lord of the Rings: The Fellowship of the Ring (2001)) the Hobbit Bilbo Baggins writes a story of his adventure for his nephew, Frodo.

Many years ago, the Dwarf king Thrór led his kin to prosperity under the Lonely Mountain until the dragon Smaug arrived. Smaug destroyed Dale, drove the Dwarves from their mountain, and took their gold. Thrór's grandson, Thorin Oakenshield, appealed to Elf king Thranduil for help, but was denied, causing him to hate Elves.

In the Shire, 51-year-old Bilbo is tricked by the wizard Gandalf the Grey into hosting a dinner for Thorin and his company of Dwarves: Balin, Dwalin, Fíli, Kíli, Dori, Nori, Ori, Óin, Glóin, Bifur, Bofur, and Bombur. Gandalf aims to recruit Bilbo as the company's "burglar" to assist them in their quest to enter the Lonely Mountain. Reluctant at first, Bilbo changes his mind after the company leaves without him the next day, racing to join them. Traveling onward, they are captured by three Trolls. Bilbo delays the Trolls from eating them until dawn, and Gandalf exposes them to sunlight, turning them to stone. The company discovers the Trolls' cave, where they find treasure and Elven blades. Thorin and Gandalf each take an Elf-made blade, Orcrist and Glamdring, respectively; Gandalf gives an Elven dagger to Bilbo.

The wizard Radagast the Brown finds the company and tells Gandalf about his encounter with the Necromancer, a sorcerer who has been corrupting Greenwood with dark magic, at Dol Guldur. Chased by Orcs, Gandalf leads them through a hidden passage to Rivendell. There, Lord Elrond discloses a hidden indication of a secret door on the company's map of the Lonely Mountain, which will be visible only on Durin's Day. Gandalf approaches the White Council — consisting of Elrond, Galadriel and Saruman the White — and presents a Morgul blade, the Witch-king of Angmar's weapon, which Radagast obtained from Dol Guldur as a sign that the Necromancer is linked to an eventual return of Sauron. Saruman expresses concern about the Dwarves' quest and requests Gandalf to end it. However, Gandalf secretly reveals to Galadriel that he anticipated this and had the Dwarves move forward without him.

The company ventures into the Misty Mountains and evades fighting Stone Giants. They seek refuge in a cave but are captured by Goblins and taken to their leader, the Great Goblin. Bilbo becomes separated from the Dwarves and falls into a crevice where he meets Gollum, who accidentally drops a golden ring. Bilbo pockets the ring and confronts Gollum. They play a riddle game, wagering that if Bilbo wins, he will be shown the way out; if he loses, Gollum will eat him. Bilbo tricks Gollum and wins, but Gollum realizes his ring is missing. Chased by Gollum, Bilbo discovers the ring grants him invisibility. As he escapes, Bilbo briefly considers killing Gollum, but spares him out of pity.

The Great Goblin informs the Dwarves that Azog, an Orc war-chief who killed Thrór and lost a hand to Thorin outside of Moria, has placed a bounty on Thorin. Gandalf arrives, helps the Dwarves escape, and kills the Great Goblin. Bilbo reunites with the group and hides his new ring. The company is ambushed by Azog and takes refuge in trees. Thorin charges Azog but is injured by his Warg. Bilbo saves Thorin and confronts Azog, just as eagles summoned by Gandalf to rescue them arrive.

The company escapes to Carrock, where Gandalf heals Thorin, who then renounces his disdain for Bilbo. They see the Lonely Mountain in the distance, where the sleeping Smaug is awoken by a thrush knocking a snail against a stone.

=== The Desolation of Smaug ===
Following their battle with Azog and his Orc party, (Note: As depicted in The Hobbit: An Unexpected Journey (2012)) Thorin Oakenshield and his company are ushered by Gandalf to the nearby home of Beorn, a skin-changer who can take the form of a bear. That night, Azog is summoned to Dol Guldur by the Necromancer, who commands him to marshal his forces for war. Azog delegates the hunt for Thorin to his son Bolg.

After telling the company about the dangers of Mirkwood, including the Necromancer's rise and the Wood-elves being dangerous, Beorn escorts the company to the borders of Mirkwood, where Gandalf discovers Black Speech imprinted on an old ruin. This, and a prior request by Galadriel, prompts him to investigate the tombs of the Nazgûl. Before leaving the company, he warns them to remain on the path. They lose their way in the forest and are ensnared by giant spiders. Bilbo frees the dwarves with the help of the invisibility ring and begins to understand its dark influence when he drops the ring and brutally kills a giant centipede to retrieve it.

The remaining spiders are killed by the Wood-elves led by Tauriel and Legolas, who capture the Dwarves and bring Thorin before their king, Thranduil. Thorin confronts the king about neglecting the Dwarves of Erebor following Smaug's attack 60 years earlier and is consequently imprisoned with the other Dwarves. Having avoided capture, Bilbo helps them escape in empty wine barrels sent downstream. They are pursued by Wood-elves and ambushed by Bolg and his Orc party, resulting in a three-way battle as they rush down the river in the barrels. The Dwarves escape both groups of pursuers, but Kíli is wounded with a Morgul shaft. Thranduil seals off his kingdom when an Orc captive reveals that an evil army is amassing in the south, but Tauriel decides to leave and assist the Dwarves, and Legolas goes after her. Gandalf and Radagast investigate the tombs of the Nazgûl and find them empty. Gandalf discovers that the Nine have been called to Dol Guldur, deducing that Sauron has returned and is preparing for war.

The company is smuggled into Esgaroth by a bargeman called Bard. Thorin promises the Master of Laketown a share of the mountain's treasure, and they are given arms and sent off to the mountain. Due to his injury, Kíli is forced to remain behind at Bard's home, tended to by Fíli, Óin, and Bofur. Bilbo discovers the hidden entrance in the Lonely Mountain and is sent inside to retrieve the Arkenstone. However, he accidentally awakens Smaug, who reveals his knowledge of the dwarves' plot.

In Laketown, Bard, a descendant of Dale's last ruler, prepares his ancestor's last black arrow in fear of an attack by Smaug, but is arrested by the Master. Bolg and his Orcs infiltrate Laketown and attack the four Dwarves, but Tauriel and Legolas arrive to defeat them, while Bolg escapes.

Meanwhile, Gandalf enters Dol Guldur alone after sending Radagast to warn Galadriel of their discovery at the tombs. The Necromancer overpowers Gandalf and reveals himself as Sauron. Gandalf is captured, as he watches helplessly as Azog and an Orc army march from Dol Guldur towards the Lonely Mountain. Inside the mountain, during a long chase, Bilbo and the Dwarves rekindle the mountain's forge using Smaug's flames and melt a large golden statue, hoping to bury Smaug alive in the molten gold. They do so, but Smaug emerges from the gold, stumbles out of the mountain and flies off to destroy Laketown as Bilbo watches in despair.

=== The Battle of the Five Armies ===
Bilbo and the Dwarves watch from the Lonely Mountain as the dragon Smaug sets Laketown ablaze. Bard breaks out of prison and kills Smaug with the black arrow. Smaug's falling body crushes the Master of Laketown and his cronies, who were escaping on a boat with the town's gold. Bard becomes the new leader of Laketown and guides its people to seek refuge in the ruins of Dale. Thorin, now possessing the vast treasure in the mountain, searches obsessively for the Arkenstone, which Bilbo had previously found but kept hidden. (Note: As depicted in The Hobbit: The Desolation of Smaug (2013)) Upon hearing that Laketown survivors have fled to Dale, he orders the entrance of the Lonely Mountain sealed off.

Meanwhile, Galadriel, Elrond, and Saruman arrive at Dol Guldur and free Gandalf, sending him to safety with Radagast. They battle and defeat the Nazgûl and then face a formless Sauron, whom Galadriel banishes to the East. Azog, marching on Erebor with his vast Orc army, sends his son Bolg to Mount Gundabad to summon their second army. Legolas and Tauriel witness the march of Bolg's army, bolstered by Orc berserkers and giant bats.

Thranduil and an Elf army arrive in Dale to reclaim treasure held by Dwarf king Thrór. To avoid war, Bard attempts to negotiate with Thorin, asking him to share the gold previously promised to Laketown, but Thorin refuses. That night, Gandalf arrives to warn Bard and Thranduil of Azog's army, but Thranduil dismisses him. Bilbo sneaks the Arkenstone out of Erebor and gives it to Thranduil and Bard to trade for treasures and prevent war.

The next morning, a combined army of Elves and Lake-town men approaches the Lonely Mountain, and Thranduil and Bard reveal that they have the Arkenstone. Thorin believes it to be a ruse, but Bilbo reveals the truth, at the same time reprimanding Thorin for his greed. Thorin nearly kills Bilbo but is stopped by Gandalf. Thorin's cousin, Dáin arrives with his Dwarf army, and a battle looms until Azog's forces arrive. As Dáin leads his forces to face the Orcs, Gandalf convinces Thranduil to join forces against Azog's army. Azog splits his army, sending some of his forces to attack Dale, so Bard and Lake-town army return to the city to defend it.

Inside Erebor, Thorin, realising his greed and selfishness, regains his sanity and leads his company to join the battle. He rides with Dwalin, Fíli, and Kíli to Ravenhill to kill Azog. Meanwhile, Tauriel and Legolas arrive to warn the Dwarves of Bolg's arrival, and Bilbo volunteers to relay the news to Thorin, using his magic ring to move through the combat unseen. Azog kills Fíli as Bilbo and the other Dwarves are forced to watch. Bolg overpowers Tauriel and kills Kíli, who has come to her aid. Legolas battles Bolg and eventually kills him. The Great Eagles arrive with Radagast and Beorn, and the Orcs are finally defeated. In the climax, Thorin engages Azog in a duel and kills him, but is fatally wounded. Bilbo reconciles with the dying Thorin, while Tauriel mourns Kíli. Thranduil advises Legolas to seek out a ranger in the north who goes by the name Strider.

Thorin's company settles back into Erebor with Dáin as their new king. Bilbo bids farewell to the company's remaining members and journeys home to the Shire with Gandalf. As the two part ways on the outskirts of the Shire, Gandalf admits his knowledge of Bilbo's magic ring and warns him of it, although Bilbo assures him that he had lost the ring. Bilbo returns to Bag End to find his belongings being auctioned off because he was presumed dead. He stops the sale and tidies up his home, revealing he still possesses the ring. Sixty years later, Bilbo happily receives a visit from Gandalf on his 111th birthday. (Note: As depicted in The Lord of the Rings: The Fellowship of the Ring (2001))

== Development ==
=== First stages ===
Jackson and Walsh first expressed interest in doing The Hobbit in 1995, at that time envisioning it as the first of a trilogy (parts two and three would have been based on The Lord of the Rings). Frustration arose when Jackson's producer, Harvey Weinstein, discovered that Saul Zaentz had production rights to The Hobbit, but that distribution rights still belonged to Metro-Goldwyn-Mayer's United Artists (which had kept those rights, believing that filmmakers would prefer to adapt The Hobbit rather than The Lord of the Rings). The United Artists studio and its parent company Metro-Goldwyn-Mayer were for sale in the mid-1990s, but the Weinsteins' attempts to buy the movie rights from United Artists were unsuccessful. Weinstein asked Jackson to go forward with adapting The Lord of the Rings. Ultimately, The Lord of the Rings was produced by New Line Cinema, not the Weinsteins, and their rights to film The Hobbit were set to expire in 2010. In September 2006, the new ownership and management of MGM, led by Harry Sloan expressed interest in teaming up with New Line and Jackson to make The Hobbit.

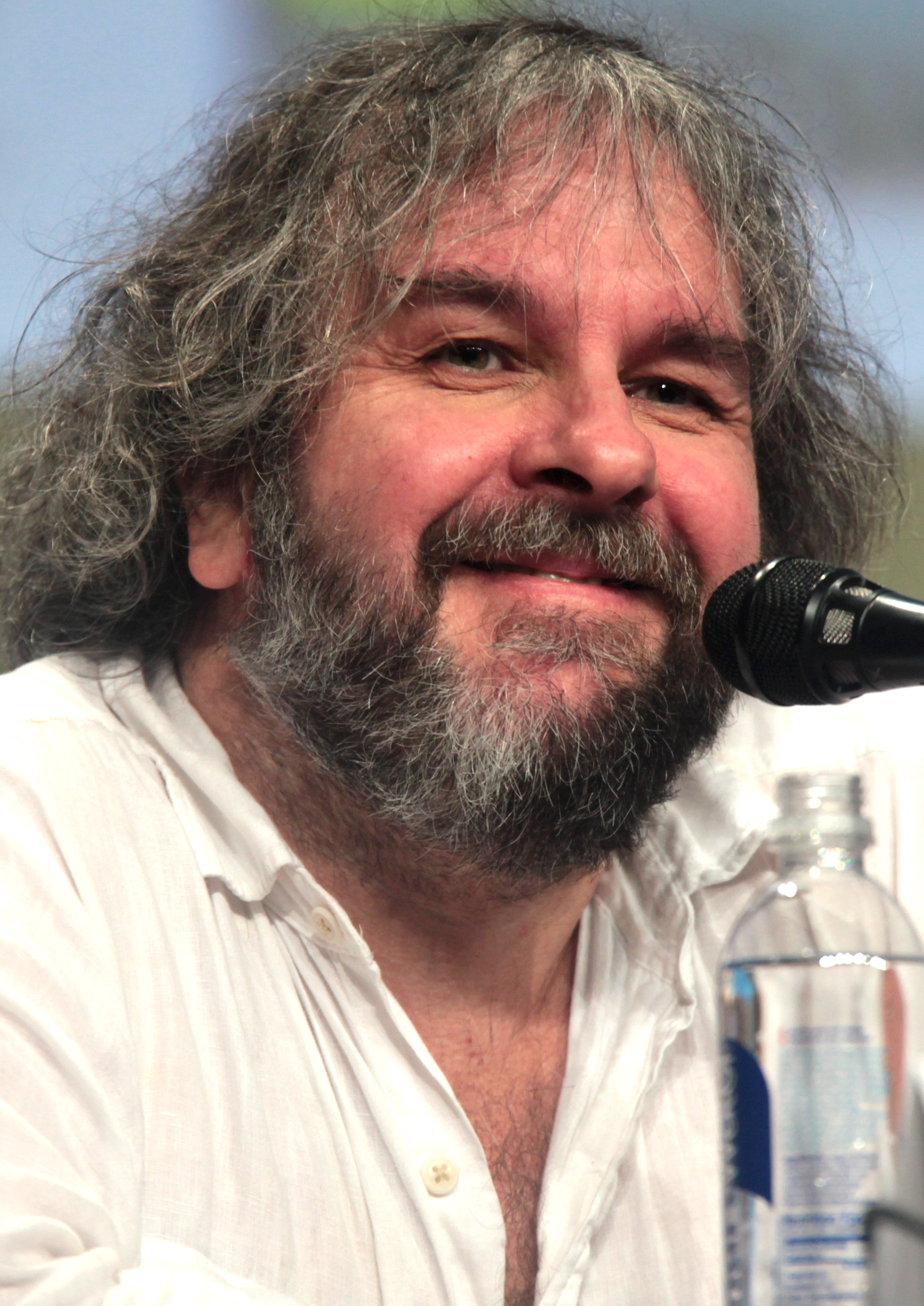
Peter Jackson, the film's director, co-writer, and producer

In March 2005, Jackson launched a lawsuit against New Line, claiming he had lost revenue from merchandising, video, and computer games releases associated with The Fellowship of the Ring. He did not seek a specific settlement, but requested an audit to see whether New Line had withheld money owed him. Although Jackson wanted it settled before he would make the film, he felt the lawsuit was minor and that New Line would still let him make The Hobbit. New Line co-founder Robert Shaye was annoyed with the lawsuit and said in January 2007 that Jackson would never again direct a film for New Line, accusing him of being greedy. Metro-Goldwyn-Mayer halted development, as Sloan wanted Jackson to be involved. By August, after a string of flops, Shaye tried to repair his relationship with Jackson. He said, "I really respect and admire Peter and would love for him to be creatively involved in some way in The Hobbit." The following month, New Line was fined $125,000 for failing to provide requested accounting documents.

On 16 December 2007, New Line Cinema and MGM announced that Jackson would be executive producer of The Hobbit and its sequel. The two studios would co-finance the film and the latter studio (via 20th Century Fox) would distribute the film outside North America—New Line's first-ever such deal with another major studio. Each film's budget was estimated to be at $150 million, compared to the $94 million budget for each of the films in Jackson's Lord of the Rings trilogy. After completion of the merger of New Line Cinema with Warner Bros. Pictures in February 2008, the two parts were announced as scheduled for release in December 2011 and December 2012. Producer Mark Ordesky, the executive producer of The Lord of the Rings, planned to return to supervise the prequels. Jackson explained he chose not to originally direct The Hobbit because it would have been unsatisfying to compete with his previous films.

In February 2008, the Tolkien Estate (through The Tolkien Trust, a British charity) and HarperCollins Publishers filed a suit against New Line for breach of contract and fraud and demanded $220 million in compensation for The Lord of the Rings trilogy. The suit claimed New Line had only paid the Estate an upfront fee of $62,500, despite the trilogy's gross of an estimated $6 billion worldwide from box office receipts and merchandise sales. The suit claimed the Estate was entitled to 7.5% of all profits made by any Tolkien films, as established by prior deals. The lawsuit sought to block the filming of The Hobbit. It was later settled in September 2009 for an undisclosed amount. However the Tolkien Trust's 2009 accounts show that it received payment from New Line Cinema of £24 million (a little over US$38 million). This amount was the Trust's estimated share in respect of the gross profit participation due for the films based on "The Lord of the Rings". Christopher Tolkien said: "The trustees regret that legal action was necessary but are glad that this dispute has been settled on satisfactory terms that will allow the Tolkien Trust properly to pursue its charitable objectives. The trustees acknowledge that New Line may now proceed with its proposed film of The Hobbit."

=== With del Toro ===
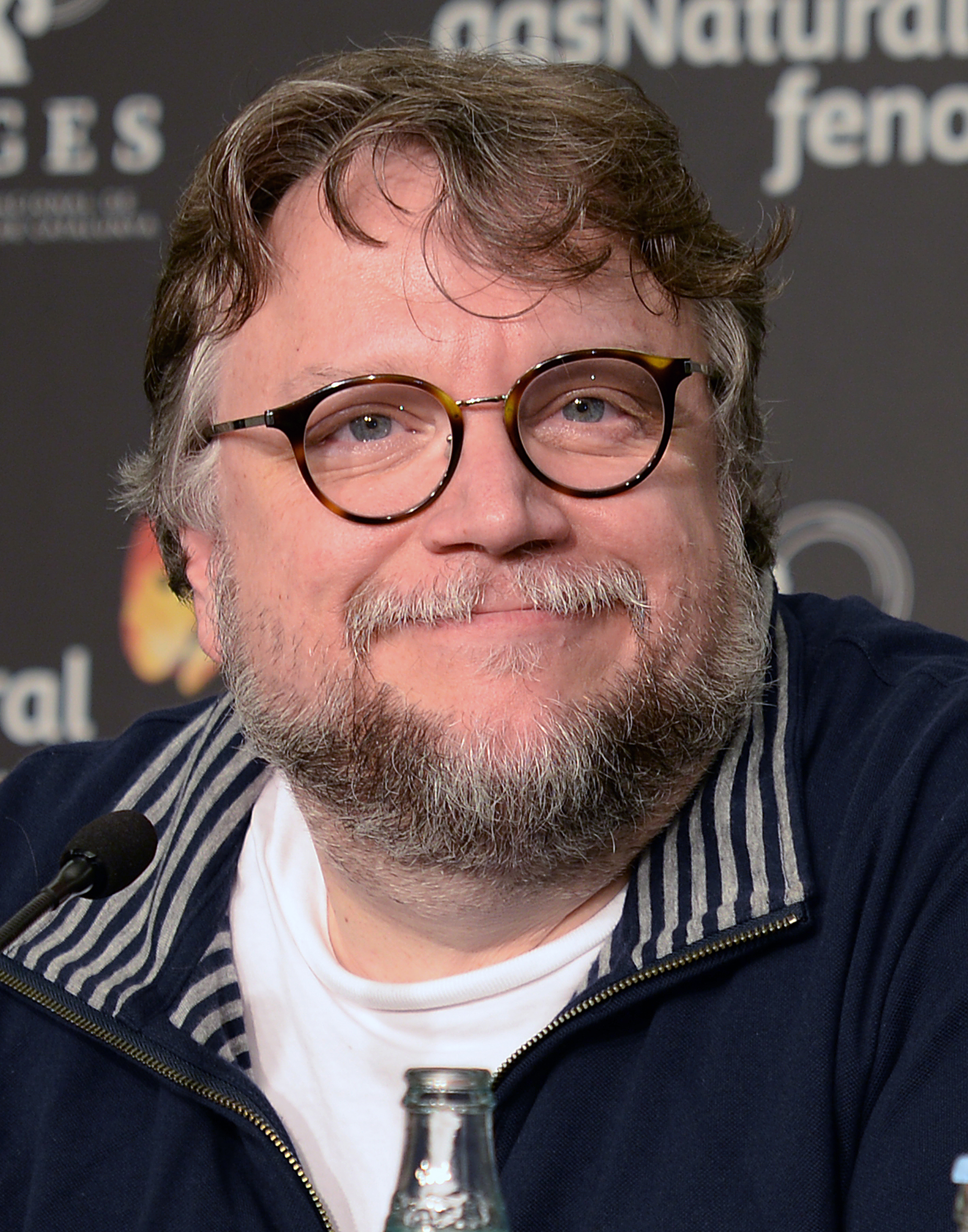
Guillermo del Toro was originally set to direct the film, but left because of ongoing delays. Jackson stated that del Toro's "creative DNA" would remain in the scripts and designs.

Despite the lawsuits, development continued to proceed and in April 2008, Guillermo del Toro was announced to direct the film. Del Toro has said he was a fan of Peter Jackson's trilogy and had discussed directing a film adaptation of Halo with Jackson in 2005. Though that project stalled, they kept in touch. In a 2006 interview, del Toro was quoted saying "I don't like little guys and dragons, hairy feet, hobbits .... I don't like sword and sorcery, I hate all that stuff". After he signed on to direct in April 2008, del Toro posted on TheOneRing.net forums that he had been enchanted by The Hobbit as a child, but found that Tolkien's other books "contain[ed] geography and genealogy too complex for my prepubescent brain". In taking the job of director, del Toro was now "reading like a madman to catch up with a whole new land, a continent of sorts—a cosmology created by brilliant philologist turned Shaman". He wrote that his appreciation of Tolkien was enhanced by his knowledge of the fantasy genre, and the folklore research he had undertaken while making his own fantasy films.

Pre-production began around August 2008, with del Toro, Jackson, Walsh and Philippa Boyens writing the scripts. Del Toro collaborated with Jackson, Walsh and Boyens via videoconferencing and flew every three weeks, back and forth from Los Angeles (where some of the designs were done) to New Zealand to visit them. Del Toro spent his mornings writing and afternoons looking at material related to Tolkien to help him understand the writer's work. He watched World War I documentaries and asked book recommendations from Jackson, who is a collector of World War I memorabilia. Del Toro felt Tolkien's experiences in that war influenced his stories.

By November 2008, del Toro had said that he, Jackson, Walsh and Boyens would realize something new about the story every week and the script was continually changing. The writing hours increased to twelve each day, as they dedicated three weeks to finally deciding the films' structures. During the first few months of 2009, writing would start from 8:30 am and end at 3:00 pm when del Toro would meet with Weta (i.e., Wētā Workshop and Weta Digital film effects companies). Completion of the story outlines and treatments ended in March 2009 and the studios approved the start of writing the screenplay. Filming was expected to take place throughout 2010 in New Zealand, with del Toro renovating the Hobbiton sets near Matamata. For his part, Jackson had kept the Rivendell scale model and the Bag End set (which he has used as a guest house) from the trilogy. During the middle of the shoot, there was expected to be a break which would have allowed del Toro to edit The Hobbit while sets would be altered for the second film. The director expected the shoot to last 370 days.

Jackson revealed in late November 2009 that he anticipated that the script for The Hobbit would not be completed until the beginning of 2010, delaying the start of production until the middle of that summer, several months later than previously anticipated. The announcement created doubts about whether the film would make its previously announced release dates of December 2011 and December 2012. Jackson reiterated that no casting decisions had been made at the time. On 22 January 2010, Alan Horn said the first Hobbit film would likely not be released until the fourth quarter of 2012.

=== Del Toro's interpretation ===
The first film will stand on its own and the second will be a transition and fusion with Peter's world. I plan to change and expand the visuals from Peter's and I know the world can be portrayed in a different way. Different is better for the first one. For the second, I have the responsibility of finding a slow progression and mimicking the style of Peter.

— Guillermo del Toro, on tonal consistency with Jackson's trilogy

Del Toro and Jackson had a positive working relationship, in which they compromised on disagreements for the benefit of the two Hobbit films. Del Toro believed he would be able to shoot the film himself, although Jackson noted he had similar hopes for filming all of his trilogy and offered to help as second unit director. Del Toro planned on shooting the film in the trilogy's 2.35:1 aspect ratio, rather than his signature 1.85:1 ratio. He hoped to collaborate again with cinematographer Guillermo Navarro.

Del Toro shares Jackson's passion for scale models and background paintings, though he wanted to increase the use of animatronics; "We really want to take the state-of-the-art animatronics and take a leap ten years into the future with the technology we will develop for the creatures in the movie. We have every intention to do for animatronics and special effects what the other films did for virtual reality." Spectral Motion (Hellboy, Fantastic Four) was among those del Toro wanted to work with again. Some characters would have been created by mixing computer-generated imagery with animatronics and some would have been created solely with animatronics or animation. Gollum would be entirely digital again; as del Toro noted, "if it ain't broke, why fix it?"

Del Toro said that he interpreted The Hobbit as being set in a "world that is slightly more golden at the beginning, a very innocent environment", and that the film would need to "[take] you from a time of more purity to a darker reality throughout the film, but [in a manner] in the spirit of the book". He perceived the main themes as loss of innocence, which he likened to the experience of England after World War I, and greed, which he said Smaug and Thorin Oakenshield represent. Bilbo Baggins reaffirms his personal morality during the story's third act as he encounters Smaug and the Dwarves' greed. He added, "The humble, sort of a sturdy moral fibre that Bilbo has very much represents the idea that Tolkien had about the little English man, the average English man", and the relationship between Bilbo and Thorin would be the heart of the film. The Elves will also be less solemn.

Del Toro met concept artists John Howe and Alan Lee, Wētā Workshop head Richard Taylor, and make-up artist Gino Acevedo in order to keep continuity with the previous Lord of the Rings films, and he also hired comic book artists to complement Howe's and Lee's style on the trilogy, including Mike Mignola and Wayne Barlowe, who began work around April 2009. He had also considered looking at Tolkien's drawings and using elements of those not used in the trilogy. As Tolkien did not originally intend for the magic ring Bilbo finds to be the all-powerful talisman of evil it is revealed to be in The Lord of the Rings, del Toro said he would address its different nature in the story, but not so much as to draw away from the story's spirit. Each Dwarf would need to look different from the others. Del Toro would have redesigned the Goblins and Wargs and the Mirkwood spiders would also have looked different from Shelob. Del Toro felt the Wargs had to be changed because "the classical incarnation of the demonic wolf in Nordic mythology is not a hyena-shaped creature".

Del Toro wanted the animals to speak so that Smaug's speech would not be incongruous, though he explained portraying the talking animals would be more about showing that other characters can understand them. Smaug would not have a "snub Simian [mouth] in order to achieve a dubious lip-synch". Del Toro stated that Smaug would be the first character design begun and the last to be approved.

Del Toro and Jackson considered the sudden introduction of Bard the Bowman and Bilbo's unconsciousness during the Battle of the Five Armies to be "less cinematic moments" reminiscent of the novel's greater "fairy tale world" than The Lord of the Rings, and they would change them to make The Hobbit feel more like the trilogy. However, del Toro did say he considered some of these moments iconic and would require the "fairy tale logic [to] work as is".

Several actors were considered by del Toro for roles in the film. He wrote the part of Beorn specifically for American actor Ron Perlman. del Toro had originally considered asking Perlman to voice the dragon Smaug, but later decided against this. Del Toro met with English actor Brian Blessed to discuss the possibility of him playing Thorin Oakenshield. The director later stated that he thought that Ian McShane "would make the most perfect dwarf". Frequent del Toro collaborator Doug Jones said that he would love to play the Elvenking Thranduil, but del Toro later stated that he had another role (or roles) in mind for the actor. Del Toro was the one who originally pushed to cast Sylvester McCoy as Radagast the Brown, a choice Peter Jackson later followed. While del Toro initially wanted Ian Holm to reprise the role of Bilbo Baggins, he also said that he "absolutely" supported the casting of Martin Freeman as the character, and wanted all other returning Lord of the Rings characters to be played by the original actors where possible.

In December 2012, Philippa Boyens expressed regret that del Toro's version of the film remained unmade. She revealed that it would have had a different script and visual elements, and would more closely have resembled a fairy tale. Boyens stated that the most significant script change was to Bilbo's characterisation: "It shifted and changed into someone who, rather than being slightly younger and more innocent in the world, once had a sense of longing for adventure and has lost it and become fussy and fusty."

=== Del Toro's departure ===
On 28 May 2010, he explained at a press conference that owing to Metro-Goldwyn-Mayer's financial troubles the Hobbit project had then not been officially green-lit at the time. "There cannot be any start dates until the MGM situation gets resolved.... We have designed all the creatures. We've designed the sets and the wardrobe. We have done animatics and planned very lengthy action sequences. We have scary sequences and funny sequences and we are very, very prepared for when it's finally triggered, but we don't know anything until MGM is solved." Two days later, del Toro announced at TheOneRing.net that "In light of ongoing delays in the setting of a start date for filming", he would "take leave from helming", further stating that "the mounting pressures of conflicting schedules have overwhelmed the time slot originally allocated for the project. ... I remain an ally to it and its makers, present and future, and fully support a smooth transition to a new director". Reports began to surface around the internet about possible directors; apparently the studios wanted Peter Jackson to return, but such names as Neill Blomkamp, Brett Ratner, David Yates and David Dobkin were mentioned.

However, this incident received negative reaction from many The Hobbit fans, who were angry at Metro-Goldwyn-Mayer for delaying the project. They also tried willing the studio to sell their rights to Warner Bros. On 27 July, del Toro responded to these angry fans, saying that "it wasn't just MGM. These are very complicated movies, economically and politically."

On 25 June 2010, Jackson was reported to be in negotiations to direct the two films. On 15 October 2010, New Line Cinema, Metro-Goldwyn-Mayer and Warner Bros. Pictures confirmed that The Hobbit was to proceed filming with Jackson returning as the director and that the film would be shot in 3D. As well as confirming Jackson as director, the film was reported to be greenlit, with principal photography beginning in February 2011. Jackson stated that "Exploring Tolkien's Middle-earth goes way beyond a normal film-making experience. It's an all-immersive journey into a very special place of imagination, beauty and drama."

Jackson had said that del Toro's sudden exit created problems as he felt he had very little preparation time remaining before filming had begin, with unfinished scripts and no storyboards, which increased the difficulty to direct the films. Jackson stated, "Because Guillermo del Toro had to leave and I jumped in and took over, we didn't wind the clock back a year and a half and give me a year and a half prep to design the movie, which was different to what he was doing. It was impossible, and as a result of it being impossible I just started shooting the movie with most of it not prepped at all. You're going on to a set and you're winging it, you've got these massively complicated scenes, no storyboards and you're making it up there and then on the spot."

Jackson also said "I spent most of The Hobbit feeling like I was not on top of it. Even from a script point of view, Fran [Walsh], Philippa [Boyens] and I hadn't got the entire scripts written to our satisfaction, so that was a very high pressure situation". However, Jackson went on to explain in the DVD/Blu-ray featurettes the various ways in which he and his crew overcame the obstacles encountered during filming. They found ways of making things work, even in a "very high pressure situation" in which he and his crew found themselves, especially the shooting of the Battle of the Five Armies which was shifted from 2012 to 2013 to be properly planned and shot.

=== Industrial dispute in New Zealand ===
In May 2010, New Zealand Actors Equity (NZAE) received from the film's producers a sample of the contracts it was offering to actors' agents. NZAE rejected the contracts as not conforming to its voluntary standard, in particular as regarded residuals. NZAE's parent, the Australia-based Media, Entertainment and Arts Alliance, contacted the International Federation of Actors, which on 24 September 2010, issued a Do Not Work order, advising members of its affiliates (including the Screen Actors Guild) that "The producers ... have refused to engage performers on union-negotiated agreements." This would subject actors who work on the film to possible expulsion from the union. In response, Warner Bros. Pictures and New Line Cinema considered taking the production elsewhere, with Jackson mentioning the possibility of filming in Eastern Europe.

Partly out of fear for the Tolkien tourism effect, on 25 October 2010, thousands of New Zealanders organised protest rallies imploring that production remain in New Zealand, arguing that shifting production to locations outside New Zealand would potentially cost the country's economy up to $1.5 billion. After two days of talks with the New Zealand government (including involvement by Prime Minister John Key), Warner Bros. executives decided on 27 October to film The Hobbit in New Zealand as originally planned. In return, the government agreed to introduce legislation to remove the right of workers to organise trade unions in the film production industry and to give money to big budget films made in New Zealand. The legislation reversed a decision by the New Zealand Supreme Court called Bryson v Three Foot Six Ltd holding that under the Employment Relations Act 2000, a model maker named Mr Bryson was an "employee" who could organise a union to defend his interests. The Employment Relations (Film Production Work) Amendment Bill was introduced on 28 October 2010 after an urgency motion, allowing it to pass its final readings the next day, 66 votes in favour to 50 opposed. The government's legislation has been criticised as breaching the International Labour Organization's core ILO Convention 87 on freedom of association, and giving an unfair subsidy to protect multinational business interests.

Some have subsequently called the price (further financial subsidies and specific laws made for the producers' benefit) that New Zealand had to pay to retain the movie 'extortionate'. It was also argued that the discussion had occurred in a climate of 'hyperbole and hysteria'.

In February 2013, emails and documents released under orders of the Ombudsman showed that the union representing actors had already reached an agreement with Warner two days before 20 October protest, but Warner refused to confirm the deal publicly. One union representative said those on the march were 'patsies' that had been fooled into thinking the production would be taken offshore. Further emails released showed Government ministers knew a deal had been reached a week before the protest, despite claiming negotiations were still happening.

=== From two to three films ===
The project had been envisaged as two parts as early as 2006, but the proposed contents of the parts changed during development. MGM expressed interest in a second film in 2006, set between The Hobbit and The Lord of the Rings. Jackson concurred, stating that "one of the drawbacks of The Hobbit is it's relatively lightweight compared to LOTR [The Lord of the Rings] .... There's a lot of sections in which a character like Gandalf disappears for a while – he references going off to meet with the White Council, who are actually characters like Galadriel and Saruman and people that we see in Lord of the Rings. He mysteriously vanishes for a while and then comes back, but we don't really know what goes on." Jackson was also interested in showing Gollum's journey to Mordor and Aragorn setting a watch on the Shire.

After his hiring in 2008, del Toro confirmed the sequel would be about "trying to reconcile the facts of the first movie with a slightly different point of view. You would be able to see events that were not witnessed in the first." He also noted the story must be drawn from only what is mentioned in The Hobbit and The Lord of the Rings, as they do not have the rights to The Silmarillion and Unfinished Tales. Del Toro also added (before writing began) that if they could not find a coherent story for the second film, they would just film The Hobbit, stating "The Hobbit is better contained in a single film and kept brisk and fluid with no artificial 'break point'." By November 2008, he acknowledged that the book was more detailed and eventful than people may remember. He decided to abandon the "bridge film" concept, feeling that it would be better for the two parts to contain only material from The Hobbit:

when you lay out the cards for the story beats contained within the book (before even considering any appendix material) the work is enormous and encompasses more than one film. That's why we are thinking of the two instalments as parts of a single narrative. That's why I keep putting down the use of a "bridge" film (posited initially). I think the concept as such is not relevant any more. I believe that the narrative and characters are rich enough to fit in two films.

Del Toro said that he was faced with two possible places to split the story, including Smaug's defeat. He noted the second film would need to end by leading directly into The Fellowship of the Ring. In June 2009, del Toro revealed he had decided where to divide the story based on comments from fans about signifying a change in Bilbo's relationship with the Dwarves. The second film's story would also have depended on how many actors could have reprised their roles.

Although The Hobbit was originally made as a two-part film, on 30 July 2012, Jackson confirmed plans for a third film, turning his adaptation of The Hobbit into a trilogy. According to Jackson, the third film would make extensive use of the appendices that Tolkien wrote to support the story of The Lord of the Rings (published in the back of its third volume, The Return of the King). While the third film, which as its title indicates, depicts the Battle of the Five Armies, largely made use of footage originally shot for the first and second films, it required additional filming as well. The second film was retitled The Desolation of Smaug and the third film was titled There and Back Again in August 2012. On 24 April 2014, the third film was renamed The Battle of the Five Armies. On the title change, Jackson said, "There and Back Again felt like the right name for the second of a two film telling of the quest to reclaim Erebor, when Bilbo's arrival there, and departure, were both contained within the second film. But with three movies, it suddenly felt misplaced—after all, Bilbo has already arrived "there" in the Desolation of Smaug". Shaun Gunner, the chairman of The Tolkien Society, supported the decision: "'The Battle of the Five Armies' much better captures the focus of the film but also more accurately channels the essence of the story."

== Cast ==
The following is a list of cast members who voiced or portrayed characters appearing in The Hobbit films.

Character	Film		
Character	An Unexpected Journey	The Desolation of Smaug	The Battle of the Five Armies
=== Thorin and Company ===
Bilbo Baggins	Martin Freeman	Martin Freeman	Martin Freeman
Gandalf the Grey	Ian McKellen	Ian McKellen	Ian McKellen
Thorin II Oakenshield	Richard Armitage	Richard Armitage	Richard Armitage
Balin	Ken Stott	Ken Stott	Ken Stott
Bifur	William Kircher	William Kircher	William Kircher
Bofur	James Nesbitt	James Nesbitt	James Nesbitt
Bombur	Stephen Hunter	Stephen Hunter	Stephen Hunter
Dori	Mark Hadlow	Mark Hadlow	Mark Hadlow
Dwalin	Graham McTavish	Graham McTavish	Graham McTavish
Fíli	Dean O'Gorman	Dean O'Gorman	Dean O'Gorman
Glóin	Peter Hambleton	Peter Hambleton	Peter Hambleton
Kíli	Aidan Turner	Aidan Turner	Aidan Turner
Nori	Jed Brophy	Jed Brophy	Jed Brophy
Óin	John Callen	John Callen	John Callen
Ori	Adam Brown	Adam Brown	Adam Brown
=== Trollshaws and Rivendell ===
Lady Galadriel	Cate Blanchett	Cate Blanchett	Cate Blanchett
Lord Elrond	Hugo Weaving		Hugo Weaving
Saruman the White	Christopher Lee		Christopher Lee
Lindir	Bret McKenzie		
Bert	Mark Hadlow		
Tom	William Kircher		
William	Peter Hambleton		
=== Mirkwood and Lake-town ===
Radagast the Brown	Sylvester McCoy	Sylvester McCoy	Sylvester McCoy
Thranduil	Lee Pace	Lee Pace	Lee Pace
Legolas Greenleaf		Orlando Bloom	Orlando Bloom
Tauriel		Evangeline Lilly	Evangeline Lilly
Bard the Bowman		Luke Evans	Luke Evans
Alfrid Lickspittle		Ryan Gage	Ryan Gage
Beorn		Mikael Persbrandt	Mikael Persbrandt
Bain		John Bell	John Bell
Braga		Mark Mitchinson	Mark Mitchinson
Master of Lake-town		Stephen Fry	Stephen Fry
Sigrid		Peggy Nesbitt	Peggy Nesbitt
Tilda		Mary Nesbitt	Mary Nesbitt
Galion		Craig Hall	
=== Dale and Erebor ===
Smaug	Benedict Cumberbatch	Benedict Cumberbatch	Benedict Cumberbatch
Dáin II Ironfoot			Billy Connolly
Thrór	Jeffrey Thomas		
Thráin II	Mike Mizrahi (old) Thomas Robins (young)	Antony Sher	
=== The Misty Mountains and Dol Guldur ===
Sauron The Necromancer	Benedict Cumberbatch	Benedict Cumberbatch	Benedict Cumberbatch
Azog the Defiler The Pale Orc	Manu Bennett	Manu Bennett	Manu Bennett
Bolg	Conan Stevens	Lawrence Makoare	John Tui
Fimbul	Stephen Ure	Stephen Ure	
Gollum	Andy Serkis		
Great Goblin	Barry Humphries		
Goblin scribe	Kiran Shah		
Grinnah	Stephen Ure		
Narzug		Ben Mitchell	
Yazneg	John Rawls		
Keeper of the Dungeons			Conan Stevens
=== Prologue and epilogue ===
Frodo Baggins	Elijah Wood		
Bilbo Baggins	Ian Holm		Ian Holm
Belladonna (Took) Baggins	Sonia Forbes-Adam		
Gerontius "The Old" Took	Dan Hennah		Dan Hennah
Butterbur Sr.		Richard Whiteside	
Betsy Butterbur		Katie Jackson	
Bill Ferny Sr.		Dallas Barnett	
Squint		Matt Smith	

== Casting ==
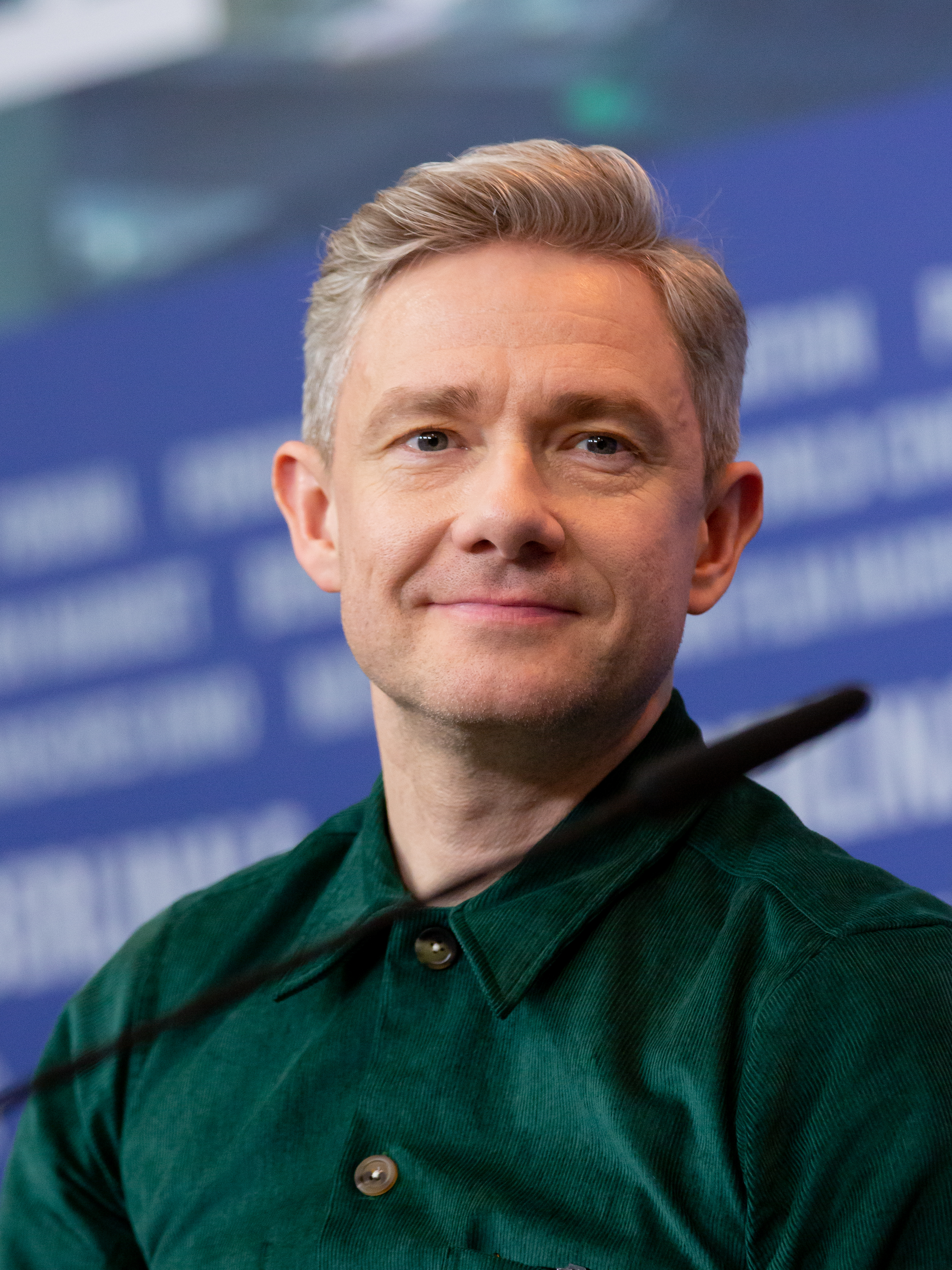
Martin Freeman was cast as the titular character.

Martin Freeman was cast in early October 2010 in the role of Bilbo Baggins. He had earlier turned the role down because of scheduling conflicts with the BBC television series Sherlock. On his casting, Peter Jackson was quoted as saying, "Despite the various rumours and speculation surrounding this role, there has only ever been one Bilbo Baggins for us. There are a few times in your career when you come across an actor who you know was born to play a role, but that was the case as soon as I met Martin Freeman. He is intelligent, funny, surprising and brave—exactly like Bilbo and I feel incredibly proud to be able to announce that he is our Hobbit." Eddie Redmayne also auditioned for the part.

Several other actors including Richard Armitage as Thorin Oakenshield, Graham McTavish as Dwalin, Aidan Turner as Kíli, Mark Hadlow as Dori, John Callen as Óin, Stephen Hunter as Bombur and Peter Hambleton as Glóin were cast later that October. On the casting of Armitage, Jackson was quoted as saying, "Richard is one of the most exciting and dynamic actors working on screen today and we know he is going to make an amazing Thorin Oakenshield. We cannot wait to start this adventure with him and feel very lucky that one of the most beloved characters in Middle Earth is in such good hands." McTavish was quoted on his casting, "I think that I would be very lucky indeed if ever again in my career, I was offered an opportunity that was going to be so iconic in its influence and scale with regards to The Hobbit. I can't think of anything comparable." On the casting of Turner, Jackson stated, "Aidan is a wonderfully gifted young actor who hails from Ireland. I'm sure he will bring enormous heart and humor to the role of Kíli." On the casting of Hadlow, Jackson said, "I have worked with Mark Hadlow on many projects [Meet the Feebles and King Kong]; he is a fantastic actor. I am thrilled to be working with [him] on these movies." Hadlow also plays Bert the Stone-troll. Callen stated, "I did wonder about my casting and how they had made the choice—maybe the long hair and the beard sold it, I thought. But now that has all gone. Given that Óin is almost 200 years old I can presume only that it was the age." Hunter said, "Being cast in The Hobbit is really exciting and really an honour. I auditioned for the original Lord of the Rings way back when I signed with my agent in New Zealand. When I saw the films I thought, 'Man, I so want to do The Hobbit.'"

James Nesbitt and Adam Brown were added to the cast in November 2010 to play Bofur and Ori respectively. It was previously reported that Nesbitt was in negotiations for a part in the film. Jackson said "James's charm, warmth and wit are legendary as is his range as an actor in both comedic and dramatic roles. We feel very lucky to be able to welcome him as one of our cast." Nesbitt's daughters also appear in the film series as Sigrid and Tilda, the daughters of Bard the Bowman. Jackson said "Adam is a wonderfully expressive actor and has a unique screen presence. I look forward to seeing him bring Ori to life." The role was Brown's first film appearance.

Cate Blanchett, Sylvester McCoy, Mikael Persbrandt, William Kircher, Ken Stott, and Jed Brophy were cast in December as Galadriel, Radagast the Brown, Beorn, Bifur, Balin, and Nori, respectively. Blanchett was the first returning cast member from The Lord of the Rings film trilogy to be cast in the films, even though her character does not appear in the novel. On her casting, Jackson said, "Cate is one of my favorite actors to work with and I couldn't be more thrilled to have her reprise the role she so beautifully brought to life in the earlier films." McCoy, the former Doctor Who star, who appeared alongside McKellen in a Royal Shakespeare Company's King Lear, was confirmed to be in negotiations to play a major role as a "wizard" in October 2010, leading to speculation he could appear as Radagast the Brown. During the production of The Lord of the Rings film trilogy, McCoy had been contacted about playing the role of Bilbo and was kept in place as a potential Bilbo for six months before Jackson went with Ian Holm. On the casting of Persbrandt, Jackson was quoted as saying, "The role of Beorn is an iconic one and Mikael was our first choice for the part. Since seeing him read for the role we can't imagine anyone else playing this character." On the casting of Stott, Jackson commented "Fran and I have long been fans of Ken's work and are excited he will be joining us on this journey." The casting of Brophy came after his collaboration with Jackson on several films, including Braindead, Heavenly Creatures, and all three Lord of the Rings films as various creatures.

Elijah Wood joined the cast by January 2011 to reprise his role of Frodo Baggins. As Frodo had not been born during the events of The Hobbit, his inclusion indicated that parts of the story would take place shortly before or during the events of The Lord of the Rings. According to TheOneRing.net, "As readers of 'The Hobbit' know, the tale of 'The Downfall of The Lord of the Rings' and 'The Hobbit or There and Back Again,' are contained in the fictional 'Red Book of Westmarch.' In Peter Jackson's LOTR films, the book is shown on screen and written in by Bilbo and Frodo and handed off to Samwise Gamgee .... The fictional book and either the telling from it or the reading of it, will establish Frodo in the film experiencing Bilbo's story. Viewers are to learn the tale of 'The Hobbit' as a familiar Frodo gets the tale as well."

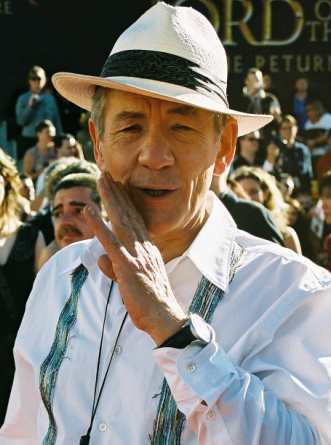
Ian McKellen returned as the wizard Gandalf.

Ian McKellen, Andy Serkis, and Christopher Lee were also cast in January to reprise their roles of Gandalf the Grey, Gollum, and Saruman the White from The Lord of the Rings film trilogy. Although McKellen and Serkis were expected to return for their roles, McKellen was previously quoted in July 2010 on TVNZ's Good Morning that: "I'm not under contract and my time is running out. I don't want to give the producers the impression that I'm sitting waiting." It was later revealed that Serkis would also serve as second unit director on the films. Serkis stated, "I think I understand Peter's sensibility and we have a common history of understanding Middle-earth. A lot of the crew from The Lord of the Rings was returning to work on The Hobbit. There is really a sense of Peter wanting people around him who totally understand the material and the work ethic." Lee had originally said he would have liked to have shown how Saruman is first corrupted by Sauron, but would not be comfortable flying to New Zealand at his age. Lee went on to say that if a film were made, he would love to voice Smaug, as it would mean he could record his part in England and not have to travel. On 10 January 2011, it was reported that Lee had entered into negotiations to reprise the role of Saruman.

Jeffrey Thomas joined the project in March 2011 as the character of Thrór, as did Mike Mizrahi as Thráin II. Bret McKenzie was added to the cast in April as Lindir. His father Peter McKenzie played the role of Elendil in The Lord of the Rings.

Ian Holm was added to the cast in April as old Bilbo Baggins. During the early stages of pre-production, former director Guillermo del Toro indicated that he was interested in having Holm reprise the role of Bilbo, but acknowledged that he might be too old to take on such a physically demanding role. On his potential casting, del Toro stated, "[Holm] certainly is the paragon we aspire to. He will be involved in some manner, I'm sure." He indicated that he was open to the possibility of Holm narrating the films. On 3 March 2011, Holm revealed that he had been in talks with the producers about reprising the role, but that he had not heard back from them yet.

In the early stages of production, the role of Thranduil had been linked to actor Doug Jones but on 29 April 2011, Jackson reported on Facebook that the role had gone to Lee Pace. On his casting, Jackson said, "Casting these Tolkien stories is very difficult, especially the Elven characters and Lee has always been our first choice for Thranduil. He's going to be great. We loved his performance in a movie called The Fall a few years ago and have been hoping to work with him since. When we were first discussing who would be right for Thranduil, Lee came into mind almost immediately." Pace performed with a British accent while portraying Thranduil, reflecting the longstanding convention of using British accents in medieval-inspired productions to convey nobility, authority, and aristocratic refinement.

Dean O'Gorman was hired in April 2011 for the role of Fíli. Jackson stated, "Dean's a terrific Kiwi actor, who I am thrilled to be working with." O'Gorman was a last minute replacement for Rob Kazinsky had originally been cast for the role in October 2010, but left the film on 24 April 2011 "for personal reasons".

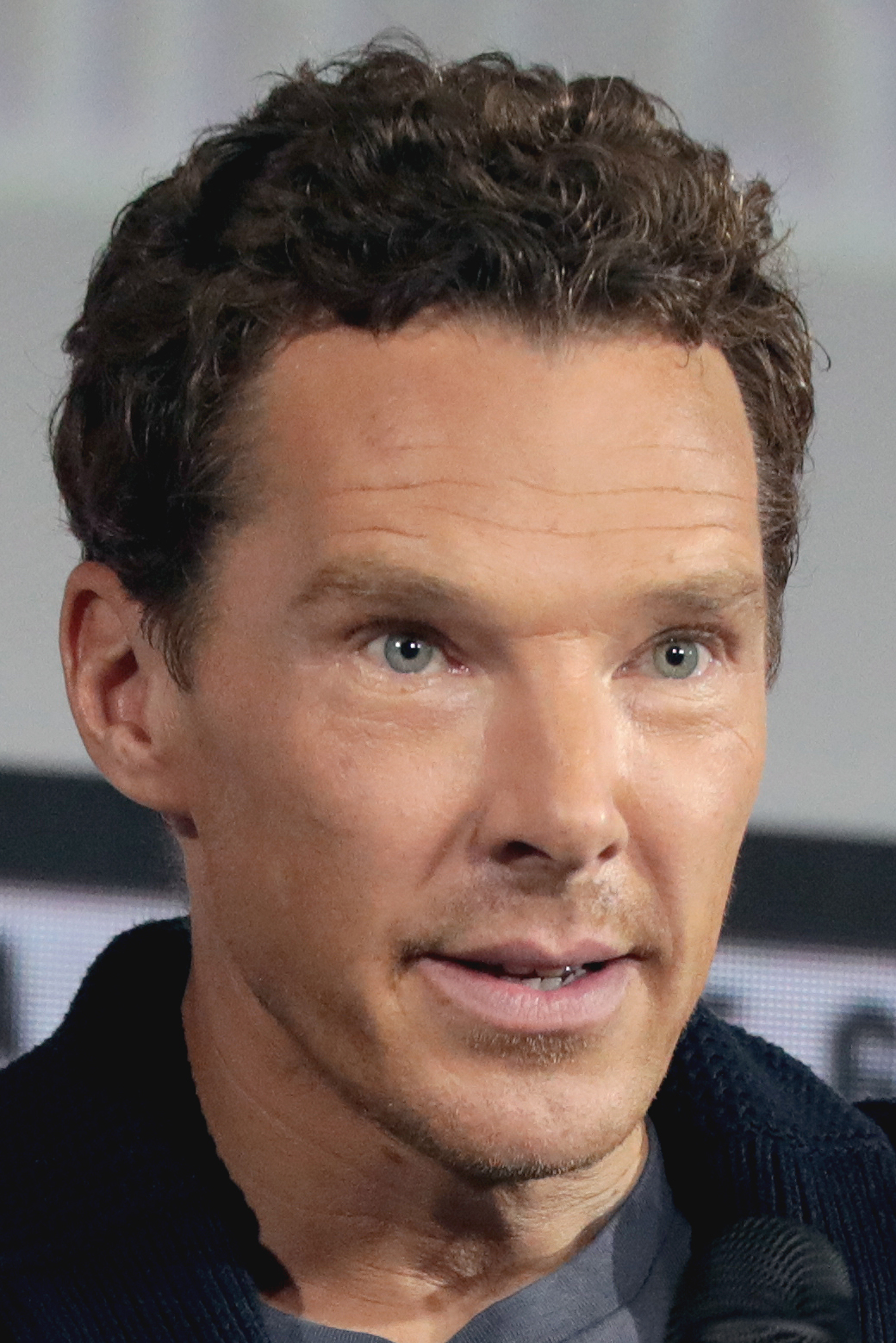
Benedict Cumberbatch, the dragon Smaug and The Necromancer

Hugo Weaving returned to the role of Elrond by May 2011. Stephen Fry and Ryan Gage also joined the project in May as Master of Lake-town and Alfrid respectively. Fry spoke of his role, saying "My character is an opportunity for sheer grossness .... [Peter Jackson] had me eating testicles ... gross appetites. I mustn't give too much away but I've got a bald cap and then on top of that a really bad combover wig and this wispy mustache and wispy beard and horrible blotchy skin and disgusting fingernails .... And generally speaking a really unappetising piece of work. And a coward to boot and very, very greedy." Gage was originally cast to play Drogo Baggins in December 2010, though according to Jackson, "Ryan is a great young actor who we originally cast in a small role, but we liked him so much, we promoted him to the much larger Alfrid part".

Orlando Bloom was cast to reprise his role as Legolas by the end of May. Bloom revealed on 25 April 2011 that he had been in contact with Jackson, who had given him a copy of the screenplay and said that there was a high probability that he would return. He was quoted as saying, "I'm going to bet on it .... But I can't really talk too much about it because it's still sort of in the ether. But I would love to go back to work with Peter Jackson. It would be an honour."

Several actors, including Luke Evans as Bard the Bowman, Evangeline Lilly as Tauriel, Barry Humphries as the Great Goblin, and Benedict Cumberbatch as Smaug and the Necromancer, were cast in June 2011. Cumberbatch portrayed both of his roles through motion capture, as did Humphries for his character. The casting of Cumberbatch was prematurely revealed by his Sherlock co-star Martin Freeman during the BAFTA Television Awards in May 2011. Speculations of his undisclosed role were further fuelled when Ian McKellen wrote on his blog that Philippa Boyens showed him Cumberbatch's screen test, stating that it was "electrifying, vocally and facially". Peter Jackson finally revealed on his Facebook page that Cumberbatch was set to play Smaug. Following this, it was also confirmed that he would be portraying The Necromancer as well.

Billy Connolly joined the cast in February 2012 as Dáin II Ironfoot. Connolly said of his character "... this guy will terrify the life out of you. I have a mohawk and tattoos on my head."

John Bell plays Bain, Manu Bennett plays Azog, Craig Hall plays Galion, Ben Mitchell plays Narzug, John Rawls plays Yazneg, Stephen Ure plays Fimbul and Grinnah, Kiran Shah plays a goblin scribe, and Stephen Colbert was cast in an undisclosed cameo. Conan Stevens was to play Bolg, but he eventually played a Gundabad Orc, also known as Keeper of Dungeons.

== Filming ==
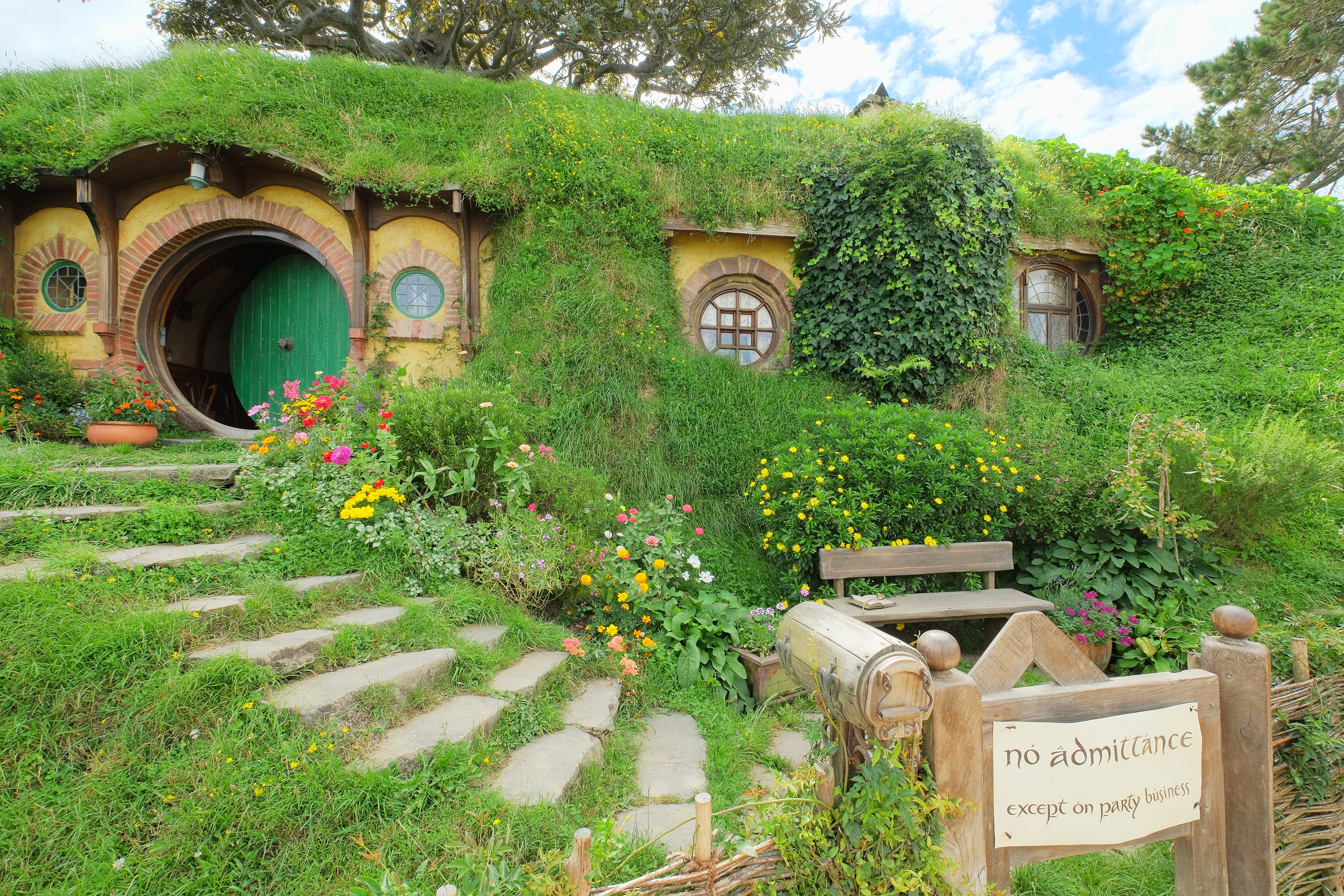
The Lord of the Rings film set of Hobbiton (including "Bag End", pictured) near Matamata was renovated and re-used for filming The Hobbit.

Principal photography began on 21 March 2011 in Wellington, New Zealand. Filming took place at Wellington Stone Street Studios, the town of Matamata and at other undisclosed locations around New Zealand.

The costumes for each of the Dwarves included six wigs and eight beards, which were worn by the actors, stunt doubles, and stand-ins.

During July 2011, scenes from The Hobbit were filmed at Pinewood Studios, England. Sets were constructed on the F and N&P Stages for the shoot. Jackson recorded a video blog from the set, which featured Christopher Lee in full makeup and costume as Saruman. All the scenes with Christopher Lee as Saruman were shot in that studio, as he was unable to travel to New Zealand. The Saruman scenes actually in New Zealand were shot with a body double. The scenes with Ian Holm as Bilbo Baggins were similarly shot in Pinewood Studios; Martin Freeman doubles as old Bilbo Baggins in one scene.

McKellen documented his filming experiences and promotional activities tied to the films from January 2011 to December 2012 in a series of online journal entries.

The second block of shooting in New Zealand began at the end of August and was completed in December 2011.

Principal photography ended on 6 July 2012, after 266 days of filming.

During May 2013, additional filming for the second and third films began in New Zealand and lasted for 10 weeks.

=== Filming locations ===
A list of filming locations
Fictional location	Specific location in New Zealand	General area in New Zealand
Forest River	Aratiatia Spillway	Taupō
Laketown	Braemar Station	Tekapo
Laketown stand-in	Canaan Downs	Tākaka
Trollshaws	Denize Bluffs	Mangaotaki
Vales of Anduin	Earnslaw Burn	Mount Aspiring National Park
Anduin Valley	Eweburn Station	Te Anau
Carrock	David's Knoll	Fiordland
Carrock stand-in	Greenstone Track	Greenstone
Gollum's cave (visually (Note: Although the scene in Gollum's cave was shot in a studio in New Zealand, Harwoods Hole was used for the background shots.))	Harwoods Hole	Tākaka
Hobbiton	Matamata	Waikato
Shores of Laketown	Miramar Peninsula	Wellington
Beorn's house surroundings	Ohuto Station	Ohakune
Beorn's house	Paradise	Otago
Forest River	Pelorus River	Marlborough
Misty Mountains	The Remarkables	Otago
Dale Hills	Rock and Pillar Range	Otago
Dale Hills	Speargrass Flat	Otago
Rhudaur	Strath Taieri	Middlemarch
Long Valley	Treble Cone Ski Resort	Wānaka
Long Valley	Turoa Ski Area	Mount Ruapehu
Lonely Mountain	Wanaka-Mt Aspiring Rd	Wānaka

=== Technology ===
3D concept art by John Howe and Alan Lee

The films were shot in 3D using Red Epic cameras. According to a production diary video, 48 Epic cameras were used during the film's production. The production employed a specialty rig designed by 3ality Technica, using two cameras and a mirror in order to achieve an intraocular effect similar to that of human sight (the distance between the eyes). This is how the depth required for 3D film is achieved.

In April 2011, Jackson revealed through his Facebook page that he would film The Hobbit at 48 fps (frames per second) instead of the normal 24 fps.

Additionally, the films were filmed at a 5K resolution, native to the Red Epic cameras, which provides a more detailed picture than the conventional 4K resolution. The films were recorded digitally onto 128 GB solid-state drives that fit into the Red Epic camera.

=== Pressure to stop using live animals ===
In a bid to pressure director Peter Jackson to stop using live animals in future films and use instead 100% CGI-inserted animals, animal rights group PETA planned protests as the film was released. In the week prior to the release of the film, PETA broadcast allegations accusing Jackson of animal abuse during filming. The incidents had happened over a year prior, were involved in the housing of animals not the filming, and had been reported to the American Humane Association, who investigated in late 2011 and recommended improvements to the animals' living areas.

== Post-production ==
=== Music ===
The music of The Hobbit film series was composed, produced and (in the case of the first film) orchestrated and conducted by Howard Shore, who scored all three The Lord of the Rings films. Recording sessions for the first film began on 20 August 2012, at Abbey Road Studios. The second and third films were recorded in New Zealand.

Unlike with the Lord of the Rings, which only received an expanded release after 2005, each Hobbit soundtrack was released in a two-CD, two-hour release. The music features 64-70 new leitmotifs, about 40 leitmotifs returning from The Lord of the Rings, and a variety of non-orchestral instruments, including bagpipes, didgeridoos and a whole Gamelan orchestra (used in the scenes with Bilbo and Smaug).

The score for An Unexpected Journey was primarily played by the London Philharmonic Orchestra (as it was for The Lord of the Rings), London Voices and Tiffin' Boys choir, although Jackson and Shore chose the New Zealand Symphony Orchestra (which participated in scoring a large section of the Fellowship of the Ring) to score The Desolation of Smaug and The Battle of the Five Armies. Additional musicians, including two gamelan orchestras, and the London Voices and Tiffin' boys choir, augmented the orchestra. Musicians Neil Finn and Ed Sheeran contributed to the score, as did some of the actors, including Richard Armitage and the cast of Dwarves, James Nesbitt, and Barry Humphries (in the extended edition). Clara Sanabras and Grace Davidson sang the soprano parts.

=== Visual effects ===
As with The Lord of the Rings trilogy, Weta Digital was involved in the creation of special effects. However, as opposed to The Lord of the Rings, where the actors who played Orcs portrayed them through full-body makeup and prosthetics, many of those actors in The Hobbit had computer-generated faces in order to portray them. Many of the actors who played Orcs in this trilogy portrayed them through performance capture. Joe Letteri served as senior visual effects supervisor on the trilogy.

After Jackson's decision to use High-Frame-Rate (48 frames per second) in high-definition for An Unexpected Journey was met with a mixed reception, he decided to make adjustments by altering the visuals of the following two films in the trilogy. During post-production for The Desolation of Smaug, Jackson commented, "When I did the colour timing this year, the colour grading, I spent a lot of time experimenting with ways we could soften the image and make it look a bit more filmic. Not more like 35 mm film necessarily, but just to take the HD quality away from it, which I think I did reasonably successfully". He also stated, "I was experimenting all the time and trying different things. It's to do with diffusing the image a little but, using what's called a Pro-Mist; it's the saturation of the color. Scene by scene I'd make decisions and choices as to which way to go, so it wasn't really one magic button to press."

== Release ==
=== Theatrical ===
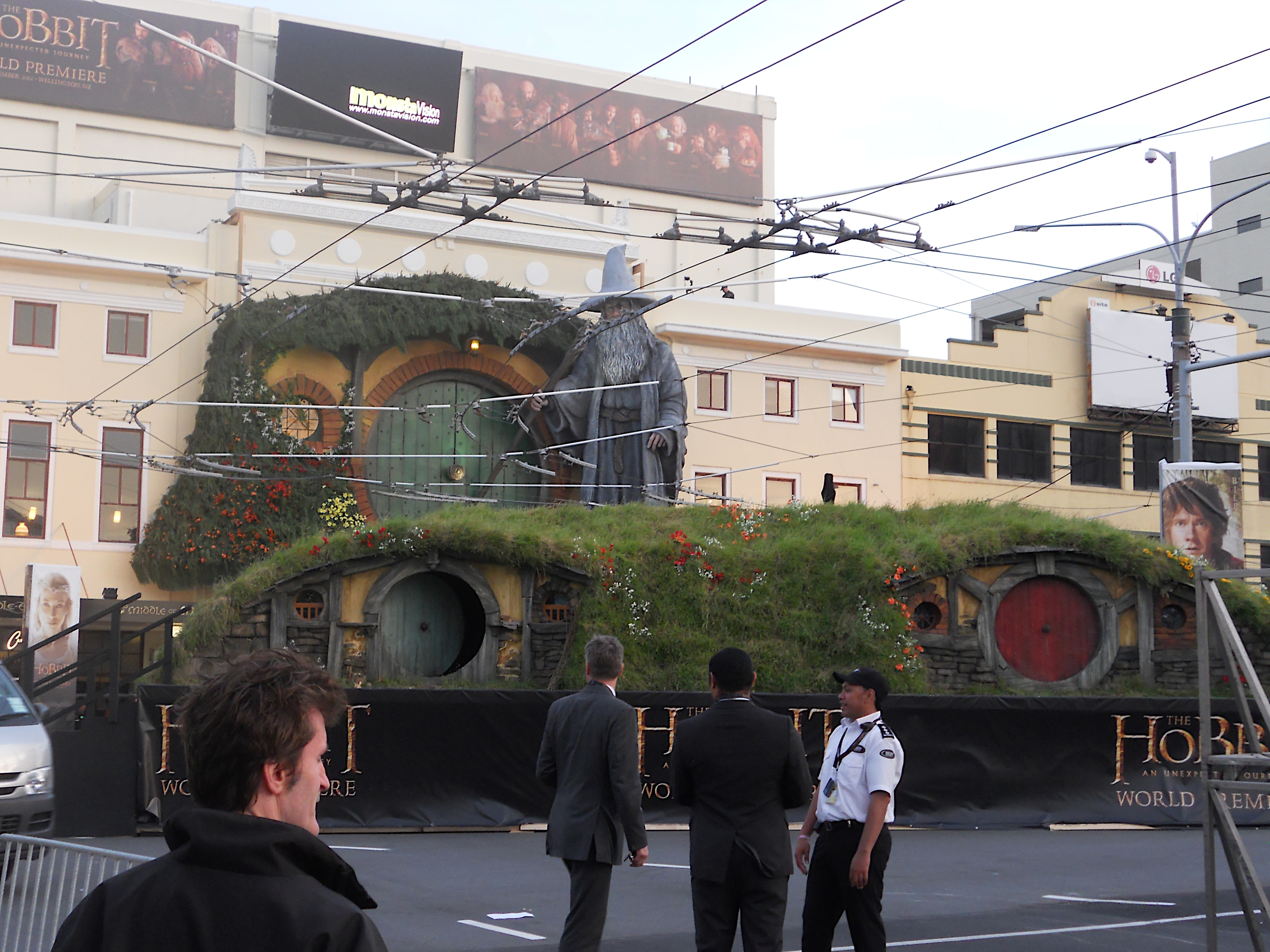
A standee outside the Embassy Theatre in Wellington, New Zealand, at the world premiere of The Hobbit: An Unexpected Journey

The world premiere for The Hobbit: An Unexpected Journey took place on 28 November 2012 in Wellington, New Zealand, with the film's wide release in New Zealand on 12 December. 100,000 people lined the red carpet on Wellington's Courtenay Place for the premiere. The entire event was also broadcast live on TV3 (New Zealand), and streamed over the Internet. Tickets to the film's midnight screenings in New Zealand sold out within minutes of going on sale, prompting director Peter Jackson to say that the fans who missed out "may get something special" which could include getting to see the film "possibly even a minute or two before anyone else". The film was released on 13 December 2012 in the United Kingdom and 14 December 2012 for some other parts of the world. It has a runtime of 169 minutes (2 hours and 49 minutes). The film has grossed over $1 billion at the box office, surpassing both The Fellowship of the Ring and The Two Towers nominally.

The Hobbit: The Desolation of Smaug premiered on 2 December 2013 in Los Angeles, and was released internationally from 11 December 2013. It has grossed over $959 million in the box office worldwide. Like the previous instalment, it surpassed both The Fellowship of the Ring and The Two Towers in nominal box office performance.

The final film The Hobbit: The Battle of the Five Armies premiered on 11 December 2014 in London, and was released internationally from 12 December 2014. The release for the third film was originally set for an 18 July 2014 release, but was pushed back when X-Men: Days of Future Past, was announced to be released on the same date, as direct competition to the third instalment. It has grossed over $962 million worldwide at the box office, and as the previous two films, it surpassed both The Fellowship of the Ring and The Two Towers.

=== Home media ===
The Hobbit: An Unexpected Journey was released on 3D Blu-ray, Blu-ray and DVD in United States on 19 March 2013, and was released in the United Kingdom on 8 April 2013. As of 7 July 2013, DVD/Blu-ray sales in the United States were reported to be around $29,527,413, with almost 3 million units sold. An Extended Edition containing 13 minutes of additional footage and original music was released on 3D Blu-ray, DVD and Blu-ray on 5 November 2013 in the US, and on 11 November 2013 in the UK.

The Hobbit: The Desolation of Smaug was released on DVD, 3D Blu-ray and Blu-ray on 7 April 2014 in the United Kingdom and on 8 April 2014 in the United States. An Extended Edition containing 25 minutes of additional footage and original music was released on 3 November 2014 in the UK, and on 4 November 2014 in the US.

The Hobbit: The Battle of The Five Armies was released on 3D Blu-ray, Blu-ray and DVD on 23 March 2015 in the United Kingdom and on 24 March in the United States. An Extended Edition of the film containing 20 minutes of additional footage and original music was released on 17 November 2015 in the United States and on 23 November in the United Kingdom.

The Hobbit trilogy was released in Ultra HD Blu-ray on 30 November 2020 in the United Kingdom and on 1 December 2020 in the United States, including both the theatrical and the extended versions of the films.

Film	Theatrical edition length	Extended edition length
The Hobbit: An Unexpected Journey	169 mins (2 hr, 49 min)	182 mins (3 hr, 2 min)
The Hobbit: The Desolation of Smaug	161 mins (2 hr, 41 min)	186 mins (3 hr, 6 min)
The Hobbit: The Battle of the Five Armies	144 mins (2 hr, 24 min)	164 mins (2 hr, 44 min)
Total runtime	474 minutes (7 hr, 54 min)	532 minutes (8 hr, 52 min)

== Reception ==
=== Box office performance ===
Film	Release date	Box office gross			Box office ranking	Budget	Reference
Film	Release date	USA & Canada	Other countries	Worldwide	Box office ranking	Budget	Reference
The Hobbit: An Unexpected Journey	14 December 2012	$303,030,651	$714,000,000	$1,017,030,651	47	$200,000,000	
The Hobbit: The Desolation of Smaug	13 December 2013	$258,387,334	$700,640,658	$959,027,992	56	$250,000,000	
The Hobbit: The Battle of the Five Armies	17 December 2014	$255,138,261	$707,063,077	$962,201,338	54	$250,000,000	
Total		$816,556,246	$2,121,703,735	$2,938,259,981	-	$700,000,000	

=== Critical and public response ===
Film	Rotten Tomatoes	Metacritic	CinemaScore
The Hobbit: An Unexpected Journey	64% (306 reviews)	58 (40 reviews)	A
The Hobbit: The Desolation of Smaug	75% (252 reviews)	66 (44 reviews)	A–
The Hobbit: The Battle of the Five Armies	59% (265 reviews)	59 (46 reviews)	A–

The decision to expand the project into a trilogy proved particularly controversial. The source material is shorter than each of the individually-adapted volumes of The Lord of the Rings, and complaints were levelled at its "bloated" length without adequate preparation, tone, dialogue, lack of gravitas and emotional weight, and the emphasis on computer-generated effects. Kotaku Australia called the trilogy "one of the great tragedies of modern cinema", writing that "after the huge success of Jackson's The Lord of the Rings trilogy, the world was expecting something far grander than the tired and bloated fanfic we ended up with."

=== Accolades ===
The Hobbit: An Unexpected Journey has won the "Technical Achievement" award by the Houston Film Critics Society, who also nominated it for "Best Original Song", the award for "Outstanding Virtual Cinematography" by the Visual Effects Society, and the Empire Awards for "Best Actor" and "Best Sci-Fi/Fantasy". The film has received three Academy Award nominations, a nomination from the Washington D.C. Area Film Critics Association, four nominations from the Broadcast Film Critics Association, six nominations from the Visual Effects Society, and three nominations from the Phoenix Film Critics Society.

==== Academy Awards ====
- The Hobbit: An Unexpected Journey — Nominations: 3 + Scientific and Technical Award
- The Hobbit: The Desolation of Smaug — Nominations: 3
- The Hobbit: The Battle of the Five Armies – Nominations: 1

The Hobbit film series at the Academy Awards
Category
Category	85th Academy Awards	86th Academy Awards	87th Academy Awards
Category	The Hobbit: An Unexpected Journey	The Hobbit: The Desolation of Smaug	The Hobbit: The Battle of the Five Armies
Best Makeup and Hairstyling	Nominated		
Best Production Design	Nominated		
Best Sound Editing		Nominated	Nominated
Best Sound Mixing		Nominated	
Best Visual Effects	Nominated	Nominated	

=== Analysis ===
The films were shown in some cinemas at 48 frames per second, twice the traditional frame rate, attracting a mixed response; critics noted the added immediacy, but that the "cinematic glow" was lost.

Scholars reflected on Jackson's transformation of Tolkien's children's book to an "epic prequel". Frank Riga and colleagues noted in Mythlore that while most film reviewers (65%) and audiences (84%) liked the trilogy, some 35% of Rotten Tomatoes reviewers complained about the "violat[ion] of Tolkien's vision"; others objected to the "amplification" of the story. Riga and colleagues did not endorse those views, arguing that Jackson transforms "an episodic, almost picaresque, tale to a chronologically developed and coherent narrative". They write that the film is Jackson's personal rendering of the book, but state that "it is consistently grounded in Tolkien's own work and plans", resulting in an enriched perception of Tolkien's work.

Other scholars were less accepting; Marek Oziewicz, writing in Journal of the Fantastic in the Arts, called Jackson's version of The Hobbit "a beautiful disaster", citing among what he called "Jackson's many missteps" the same "interminable battle scenes, the relentless trivialization of story, [and] the flattening of characters" that in his view characterized Jackson's Lord of the Rings trilogy.

=== Derivative works ===
==== Toys ====
On 6 October 2011, Warner Bros. Consumer Products and U.S. toy company The Bridge Direct announced their partnership on worldwide master toy rights for The Hobbit films. The toy line will include action figures, playsets and role-play accessories like swords and battle axes representing the characters and weapons in the films.

The first wave of toy products hit store shelves in October 2012, ahead of the release of The Hobbit: An Unexpected Journey. U.S. retailers that carry the toy line include Toys "R" Us, Kmart, and Walmart. Games Workshop released miniatures from The Hobbit as part of The Lord of the Rings Strategy Battle Game. The company has had rights to produce miniatures from the original book for some years but has not released any lines, save for a stand-alone game based on the Battle of Five Armies, with original designs not related to The Lord of the Rings films.

On 16 December 2011, Warner Bros. and Lego announced the development of figures and play sets based on the upcoming adaptations of The Hobbit as well as The Lord of the Rings. The launch of the Lego The Hobbit: An Unexpected Journey was released to coincide with the release of the film adaptation's first part in December 2012.

==== Video games ====
Following the expiration in 2008 of Electronic Arts' license to The Lord of the Rings, Warner Bros. Interactive Entertainment acquired the rights to develop a video game based on The Hobbit. When Guillermo del Toro was set to direct he had stated that a video game, if it were to be made, would not be released to tie-in with The Hobbit film, but rather after their release. Del Toro had stated that while he would like to be involved in the video game's creation, making it at the same time as the film would complicate things due to a "tight schedule".

In 2008 British video game developer Traveller's Tales spent $1 million making an Xbox 360 The Hobbit demo in six months. This demo was designed to convince The Lord of the Rings director Peter Jackson, and Guillermo del Toro, who at the time was attached to The Hobbit movie, that Traveller's Tales was capable of making a non-Lego game based on the upcoming film. Traveller's Tales built four The Lord of the Rings-themed levels, including two stealth demos featuring Frodo, a Gandalf versus Saruman demo, and a Gandalf versus the Balrog demo, plus five additional tech demos, including an Aragorn combat tech demo. In February 2009, Jon Burton flew to New Zealand to pitch to Jackson and del Toro. Warner Bros. ultimately decided to invest in a game not based directly on the movie, but happened in the same world at the same time.

In October 2011, Warner Bros. confirmed that a Hobbit video game would be released in 2012, before the first film's release. However, the studio did not confirm whether or not the game would be a tie-in with the film.

Warner Brothers developed two free-to-play online strategy games in collaboration with Kabam for promoting the film series which were The Hobbit: Kingdoms of Middle Earth released for Android and iOS on 8 November 2012 and The Hobbit: Armies of the Third Age playable online on web browsers and as a Facebook app that was released on 21 March 2013. The full list of mobile and browser games developed to coincide with the films' theatrical releases includes:

- The Hobbit: Dwarf Combat Training (2012)
- The Hobbit: Kingdoms of Middle-earth (2012)
- The Hobbit: Armies of The Third Age (2013)
- The Hobbit: The Desolation of Smaug – A Journey through Middle-earth (2013)
- The Hobbit: The Desolation of Smaug – Barrel Escape (2013)
- The Hobbit: The Desolation of Smaug – Spiders of Mirkwood (2013)
- The Hobbit: Battle of the Five Armies – Orc Attack (2014)
- The Hobbit: Battle of the Five Armies – Fight for Middle-earth (2014)

Monolith Productions developed Guardians of Middle-earth, which was released on 4 December 2012 for PlayStation 3 via the PlayStation Network, and 5 December 2012 for Xbox 360 via Xbox Live Arcade. Guardians of Middle-earth delivers a multiplayer online battle arena (MOBA) game set in Middle-earth and crafted specifically for the console systems. Gamers can play in teams of up to 10 players in strategic five versus five competitive multiplayer battle arenas in the epic setting of Middle-earth. Players can develop and master more than 20 guardians, including Gandalf, Sauron, Gollum and many more, forming memorable and unlikely alliances with and against friends. Gamers can connect via an in-game voice communication system, as well as access a comprehensive online stat and leader board system where they can track friends' victories and defeats. The game featured tie-ins to The Hobbit: An Unexpected Journey film, released in 2012.

On 25 November, Warner Brothers confirmed Lego The Hobbit video game. The game's levels only took place in the first two films. The game was released 8 April 2014.

Another video game which was developed by Monolith Productions is Middle-earth: Shadow of Mordor, this time to promote The Hobbit: The Battle of the Five Armies. The events of the game take place directly after Sauron fled to Mordor, escaping The White Council, which was shown at the beginning of the film. The game was designed to act as an overlap between The Hobbit and The Lord of the Rings. It was released for Microsoft Windows, PlayStation 4 & Xbox One in October 2014 and for PlayStation 3 and Xbox 360 on 21 November.

== Bibliography ==
- Sibley, Brian (2006), Peter Jackson: A Film-maker's Journey, London: HarperCollins, ISBN 0-00-717558-2.
