= List of original characters in The Hobbit film series =

This is a list of original characters found in Peter Jackson's series of film adaptations of J. R. R. Tolkien's 1937 novel The Hobbit.

== Men ==
Ryan Gage as Alfrid in Peter Jackson's The Hobbit: The Desolation of Smaug.

Alfrid Lickspittle (portrayed by Ryan Gage) is a cowardly and greedy sycophant. He was a government official of the town of Esgaroth and the Master of Lake-town's conniving servant.

Betsy Butterbur, a relative of Barliman Butterbur from The Fellowship of the Ring, appears as a barmaid of The Prancing Pony in the prologue of The Hobbit: The Desolation of Smaug, portrayed by Peter Jackson's daughter Katie Jackson.

- Richard Whiteside appears as Butterbur Sr.

Bill Ferny Sr., an assassin hired by Azog to neutralise Thorin at the Prancing Pony. He is the father of Bill Ferney, a henchman of Saruman who confronted Frodo Baggins in Bree but was absent from Jackson's Lord of the Rings series. He is portrayed by Dallas Barnett.

- A Squint-Eyed Southerner appears alongside Bill Ferny at the Prancing Pony in the prologue of The Hobbit: The Desolation of Smaug, portrayed by New Zealand actor Matt Smith.

Braga (portrayed by Michael Mitchinson) is captain of the Lake-town Guard. He has, however, just as little to no regard for the common folk of Lake-town as the Master and Alfrid. The captain is not named in the novel and has a smaller part.

Hilda Bianca (portrayed by Sarah Peirse) is a woman of Lake-Town, among the first to spot the dwarves as Bard leads them through the city.

Percy (portrayed by Nick Blake) is the gatekeeper of Lake-Town and a friend of Bard.

Tilda and Sigrid (portrayed by Mary and Peggy Nesbitt respectively) are the daughters of Bard the Bowman. In Tolkien's legendarium, Bain is the only known child of Bard.

== Elves ==
Tauriel (portrayed by Evangeline Lilly) is a female Elf from Mirkwood and the Chief of the Guards for the Elvenking, Thranduil. She also has a romantic subplot with the dwarf Kili.

Elros (portrayed by Robin Kerr) is an Elf of the Woodland Realm appearing in The Hobbit: The Desolation of Smaug. He is a captain of the Woodland Guard and Keeper of the Keys.

Feren (portrayed by Simon London) is an Elf of the Woodland Realm. He serves as one of Thranduil's chief lieutenants during the Battle of The Five Armies.

== Hobbits ==
Fredegar Bolger - Overweight hobbit and friend of Frodo Baggins omitted from the film adaptation of The Fellowship of the Ring. A character sharing Fredegar's name and physique appears in the epilogue of The Hobbit: The Battle of the Five Armies, where he buys some of Bilbo's furniture from the auctioneer, Mr. Grubb.

Fredegar Chubb (portrayed by Eric Vespe from Ain't It Cool News) is a Hobbit who sells Bilbo a fish at the market in the extended edition of The Hobbit: An Unexpected Journey. Vespe was present on set making reports on the location shooting; he was invited to appear as an extra in Hobbiton scenes, and was then promoted to a minor speaking part.

Master Worrywort (portrayed by Timothy Bartlett) is a hobbit of the Shire and a neighbor of Bilbo's.

Master Stadle (portrayed by Kiran Shah) is a Hobbit who is hoisted by his Man friend onto a bar stool at The Prancing Pony.

== Orcs ==
Fimbul (portrayed by Stephen Ure) is an Orc and Warg rider, one of Yazneg's orcs.

Grinnah (portrayed by Stephen Ure) is the goblin who introduces the Dwarves to the Great Goblin and searches their possessions. He is killed by Kili as the dwarves and Gandalf make their escape.

Narzug (portrayed by Ben Mitchell) is one of Azog's Hunter Orcs. He is taken captive by Legolas and Tauriel in The Hobbit: The Desolation of Smaug and brought to the Elvenking's halls, where, after interrogation, he is decapitated by Thranduil.

Ragash is an Orc who relays to Azog that the army is ready to attack on the next day's morning in The Hobbit: The Battle of the Five Armies. Ragash is portrayed by Allan Smith, while Martin Kwok provides his voice.

Yazneg (portrayed by John Rawls) is a fierce Orc lieutenant and second-in-command of Azog's hunter party in An Unexpected Journey. He finds Thorin's Company while they camp at night in the Lone Lands, and he leads the attack of the Hunter Orcs against the party as they flee the Trollshaws. He is killed by Azog on Weathertop.

The goblin scribe (portrayed by Kiran Shah) is a tiny goblin with a brief appearance as a scribe and messenger for the Great Goblin in The Hobbit: An Unexpected Journey.

The Keeper of the Dungeons (portrayed by Conan Stevens) is a large, heavily armored Orc that appears briefly in The Hobbit: An Unexpected Journey and then again in The Hobbit: The Battle of the Five Armies. He is first seen during the Battle of Azanulbizar where is seen among the army of Orcs. He later appears in Dol Guldur where he brutally tortures the imprisoned Gandalf for trespassing in his master's fortress. In the extended edition, he interrogates Gandalf on the whereabouts of the Elven Rings of Power.

== See also ==
- List of original characters in The Lord of the Rings film series
