= Tauriel =

Fictional character from The Hobbit movies

- Peter Jackson's The Hobbit character
- Evangeline Lilly as Tauriel
- First appearance: The Desolation of Smaug (2013)
- Last appearance: The Battle of the Five Armies (2014)
- Created by: Peter Jackson; Fran Walsh
- Portrayed by: Evangeline Lilly

In-universe information
- Aliases: Daughter of the Forest (Tauriel translated into English)
- Species: Elf; Silvan
- Gender: Female

Tauriel is a fictional character from Peter Jackson's feature film adaptation of J. R. R. Tolkien's The Hobbit. The character does not appear in the original novel, but was created by Peter Jackson, Philippa Boyens, and Fran Walsh as an expansion of material adapted from the novel. She appears in the second and third films in that trilogy, The Hobbit: The Desolation of Smaug and The Hobbit: The Battle of the Five Armies.

She is a Woodland Elf whose name has been translated as "Daughter of the forest", and is the head of the Mirkwood Elven guard. She is played by Canadian actress Evangeline Lilly, who was nominated for several awards for her performance in The Desolation of Smaug, with some of the stunt work performed by Australian stuntwoman Ingrid Kleinig.

== Appearances ==
The character of Tauriel was created for the films, having no equivalent character in the original novel. She first appears in the second film of the trilogy, The Desolation of Smaug, released December 13, 2013. Prior to the decision to have three films instead of two, Tauriel was described as having a more substantial role in what was then the final film, The Hobbit: The Battle of the Five Armies, which had been planned for release in 2013, but was finalized as the third part of the trilogy, which was released in December 2014.

In The Desolation of Smaug, the hobbit Bilbo Baggins and thirteen dwarves, while traveling to Lonely Mountain, pass through the black forest of Mirkwood, where they are attacked and captured by giant spiders. The spiders are then attacked by the Wood Elves, led by Legolas and Tauriel. Tauriel in particular saves Kíli by killing two spiders that attacked him, but the Elves subsequently take the dwarves as prisoners for trespassing on their land.

Later, Tauriel is recognized as a talented warrior and therefore leader of the Mirkwood border guards. Legolas, the son of Mirkwood's Elven king Thranduil, is attracted to her, but she does not believe herself worthy of him as a Silvan Elf. Thranduil, in fact, makes it clear that he does not consider her to be a suitable match for his son and warns her not to give Legolas false hope. During the dwarves' imprisonment, Tauriel forms a romantic bond with Kíli, whom she heals after he's poisoned.

In The Hobbit: The Battle of the Five Armies, during Smaug's attack on Esgaroth, Tauriel and the dwarves facilitate the evacuation of Bard's family, though Bain leaves their company and helps Bard kill Smaug. The following morning, as the dwarves set out for Erebor to rejoin their company, Kíli asks Tauriel to come with them, but her duties with Legolas forces them to part. When a messenger from Thranduil arrives to announce her banishment from the Mirkwood Realm for disobeying his orders, she joins Legolas in investigating the old fortress Gundabad, where they witness the departure of an army led by Bolg to join the forces of his father Azog marching against Erebor.

Hurrying towards the mountain, the two Elves arrive in the thick of the Battle of the Five Armies. When Tauriel witnesses Thranduil attempting to leave the battlefield, with the intent of sparing his people further bloodshed, she accuses him of turning away and abandoning the dwarves to be slaughtered. Thranduil states that the dwarves are fated to die, as they are mortal and thus the timing of their demise does not matter. Tauriel then nocks an arrow; pointing it at Thranduil as she queries him whether he believes his life is more valuable than those of dwarves, and proclaims that he is devoid of love. Thranduil, dismissing the notion that Tauriel's regard for Kíli is genuine love, destroys her bow and threatens her life. However, he backs down when his son Legolas intervenes saying, "If you harm her, you will have to kill me." Learning that Kíli had joined Thorin's pursuit of Azog, she and Legolas hurry to Azog's command post, the Ravenhill, to aid the dwarves.

Running to find Kíli, Tauriel is intercepted and brought to her knees by Bolg. Before the Orc can strike the fatal blow, however, Kíli comes to her aid, and Bolg kills him instead. In retaliation, Tauriel tackles Bolg, throwing him and herself off a ruined platform onto the rocks beneath, thus leading to Bolg's final battle with Legolas, who kills Bolg. Following the resolution of the battle, Thranduil finds Tauriel weeping over Kíli's body.

== Conception and casting ==
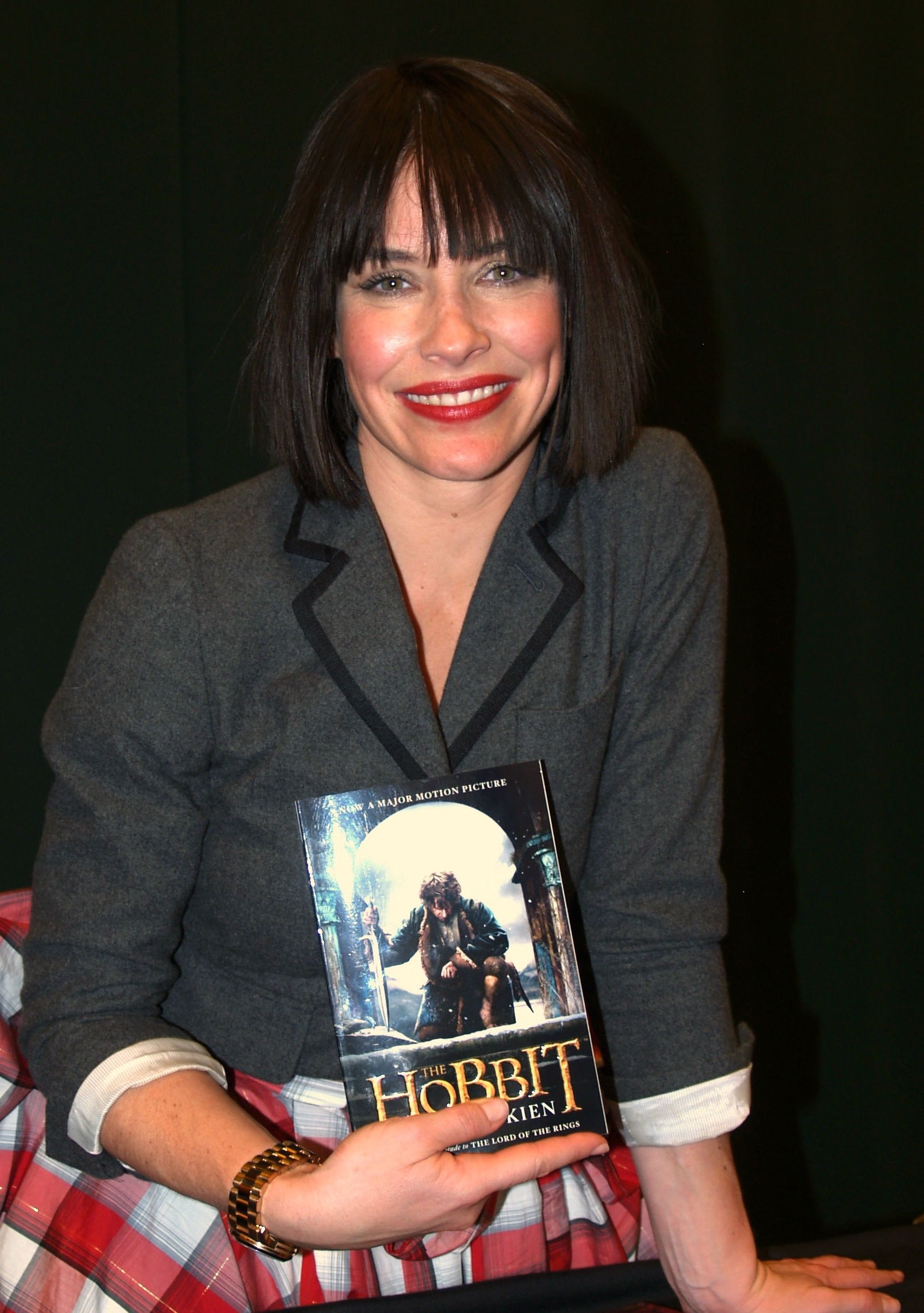
Actress Evangeline Lilly, who plays Tauriel, had been a fan of Tolkien since she was 13.

The character Tauriel does not appear in The Hobbit, but was created to be the head of the Elven guard by Peter Jackson and his writing partners Philippa Boyens and Fran Walsh (who is also Jackson's wife and producing partner) in order to expand the world of the elves of Mirkwood Forest and to bring another woman to the cast, which is otherwise dominated by men. Tauriel is a Silvan Elf, which means she is of a much lower order than the elves that had previously been seen in The Lord of the Rings film series, and holds a lower social status than characters like Arwen, Galadriel, Elrond, and Legolas. A Woodland Elf, her name has been translated as "Forest Daughter."

In June 2011 Peter Jackson announced that actress Evangeline Lilly, who was known for her portrayal of Kate Austen in the ABC television drama Lost, had been cast in the role. Lilly had been a fan of Tolkien's books since she was 13. Following the June 12, 2013 release of the first trailer for the film, some fans expressed dissatisfaction with the creation of a character that did not originate in the source material.

Filming of Tauriel's scenes began in September 2011 in New Zealand, and was expected to last a year. Lilly stated that she enjoyed the relaxed atmosphere of the set, and the familiar experience of filming with a male-dominated cast, which was reminiscent of her work on Lost and The Hurt Locker. Lilly employed a language coach in order to affect the Elvish language.

Lilly employed a stunt coach for action scenes. She noted that the experience of having had her first child in May 2011 made aspects of filming the fighting scenes more strenuous than expected, commenting, "Recovering from labor is like recovering from a full-body injury, and I didn't realize to what extent that was true until I started training for elf fighting. My hips don't move like they used to move, my back doesn't move like it used to move, my shoulders are sore every day. But it's fun." Although Lilly requested to do the character's wirework herself, on account of her experience doing her own stunts on Lost, that work was performed by Lilly's stunt double, Australian stuntwoman Ingrid Kleinig.

== Reception and cultural impact ==
For her performance as Tauriel, Evangeline Lilly was nominated for the Saturn Award for Best Supporting Actress, the Broadcast Film Critics Association Award for Best Actress in an Action Movie, the Empire Award for Best Supporting Actress, and the 2014 Kids' Choice Awards.

In an article written in The Huffington Post, Clarence Haynes compared Tauriel to Katniss Everdeen from The Hunger Games, describing both of them as archetypical embodiments of the ancient Greek goddess Artemis. Michael O'Sullivan of The Washington Post, in his review of The Desolation of Smaug, welcomed Tauriel's addition to the set of characters and called her "a sort of pointy-eared Lara Croft".

Shaun Gunner, Chairman of the Tolkien Society, praised the inclusion of Tauriel as "the biggest gem and missed opportunity of this film" stating that she provides "a strong and warm voice in the story" but that the writers "were wrong to cheapen the character by putting her in a love-triangle". Fan reaction to Tauriel's appearance in The Hobbit films, and to other changes made by Jackson in adapting Tolkien's book for the screen, were parodied in the song and video "Who the 'ell is Tauriel?" by The Esgaroth Three.

In Mad magazine's parody of The Desolation of Smaug, writer Desmond Devlin emphasized the similarity of the setting in which actress Evangeline Lilly's character was placed with that of her character on Lost, with her statement, "I can't believe I'm back in another weird forest, fighting random threats and making random alliances on a vague and poorly-defined mission. I thought I was done with that stuff when they cancelled Lost!" Devlin, who had begun a running joke of alluding to Legolas (called Legolamb in the parody) being effeminate in the magazine's parodies of the original Lord of the Rings trilogy, also used Tauriel to return to that gag, as well as referencing Tauriel's lack of canonicity.

== See also ==
- List of original characters in The Hobbit film series
