= Bard the Bowman =

Tolkien character

- The Lord of the Rings character
- Luke Evans as Bard the Bowman
- First appearance: The Hobbit (1937)
- Created by: J.R.R. Tolkien

In-universe information
- Occupation: Archery captain; Ruler of Dale
- Weapon: Bow
- Relatives: Girion, Lord of Dale (ancestor); Bain (son); Brand (grandson)
- Home: Esgaroth; Dale

Bard the Bowman is a character in J. R. R. Tolkien's The Hobbit. A man of Lake-town and a descendant of the ancient Lords of Dale, Bard manages to kill Smaug the dragon, after which he becomes king of Dale. Tolkien created the character specifically to kill Smaug, since none of the other protagonists of the story were able to fulfill this role. Bard the Bowman may have been inspired by the warrior Wiglaf in the Old English poem Beowulf.

== Fictional history ==
Bard is a descendant of Girion, the last lord of the city of Dale, which had been destroyed by the dragon Smaug 171 years before the events of The Hobbit, which takes place in year 2941 of the Third Age. He is the captain of a company of archers in Esgaroth (also known as Lake-town). His friends accused him of prophesying floods and poisoned fish, but they knew his worth and courage. He is described as tall and grim with black hair. (Note: Tolkien 1937, Chapter XIV.) When Smaug attacks Lake-town, Bard is the last of the archers to stand his post, but the dragon is immune to arrows. However, a thrush speaks to Bard, showing him the weak spot in the dragon's armour in the hollow under Smaug's left breast, which Bilbo had discovered in his conversation with Smaug. He fires his favourite shaft, the family heirloom "Black Arrow", and kills Smaug, who falls onto Lake-town, destroying it.

After the dragon's death, Bard joins the survivors of the attack on Lake-town and discovers that they had thought him dead. The survivors receive assistance from the elves of Mirkwood, and together Thranduil and the able-bodied men of Lake-town travel to the Lonely Mountain to claim a share of the dragon hoard. In the absence of Thorin Oakenshield and his company, all believed to have been killed by the dragon, Bard has a rightful claim to the treasure as the heir of Girion, and also a charitable claim to alleviate the suffering of the people of Lake-town.

However, at the Lonely Mountain, Bard discovers that Thorin Oakenshield, King under the Mountain, is very much alive, along with all his companions. Their response to Bard's claim is to barricade themselves inside the mountain, refusing to surrender any of the treasure under threat of war. (Note: Tolkien 1937, Chapters XV and XVI.) To break the stalemate, Bilbo Baggins slips out of the mountain at night and offers the Arkenstone to Bard in order to put pressure on Thorin to make peace with the Elves and Men. However, Thorin is unwilling to share any of Smaug's treasure with an armed host at his gates, which causes the elves and men to prepare to besiege the mountain. To make matters worse, Thorin's cousin Dain Ironfoot arrives to reinforce Thorin's claim to their family home under the mountain. However, a large army of Goblins and Wargs arrives on the scene, forcing the three armies to unite to fight against them. Bard leads the men into battle, reinforced by the arrival of Beorn and the Eagles. (Note: Tolkien 1937, Chapter XVII.)

After the death of Thorin in the Battle of Five Armies, Dain becomes King under the Mountain. He redeems the Arkenstone from Bard with a fourteenth of the treasure, which is used to re-establish Dale. (Note: Tolkien 1937, Chapter XVIII.) Over the next three years, Bard rebuilds the city of Dale and becomes its ruler. The city begins to prosper again. (Note: Tolkien 1937, Chapter XIX.) Bard's reign lasts for thirty-three years. He is succeeded by his son Bain. (Note: Tolkien 1955, Appendix II, "The Third Age") His grandson, Brand, fought alongside Dain in the Battle of Dale against a horde of Sauron's Easterling invaders during the War of the Ring.

== Creation ==
During the drafting of The Hobbit, Tolkien considered how Smaug should die and who would kill him. Tolkien's notes for chapter nine show him considering the option of Bilbo killing the dragon in his sleep, piercing his weak point with a lance, similar to the events in Jack the Giant Killer. This idea remained in his notes after the writing of chapter eleven, but once chapter twelve was complete, Tolkien penned "Dragon killed in the Battle of the Lake" in the margin of his notes.

Bard appears during the drafting for chapter thirteen, when it is said that he kills the dragon with his ancestor Girion's favourite Black Arrow. Tolkien's keeping Bard alive for the rest of the story significantly complicates it since, as the heir of Girion, Bard gives the inhabitants of Lake-town a legitimate claim to Smaug's treasure.

== Analysis ==
According to John D. Rateliff, Bard may have been inspired by Wiglaf in the Old English poem Beowulf, which inspired Tolkien with many elements in the final chapters of The Hobbit. Like Bard, Wiglaf is introduced late into the story, is not named until late in the story, is the only one with enough courage to face a dragon and is of royal lineage. Rateliff believes that Bard is the first human character in Tolkien's work to experience a happy fate, unlike Beren, Húrin and Túrin Turambar. Rateliff sees Bard as a precursor and foreshadower of Aragorn: both restore their ancestor's kingdoms in all their glory.

Marjorie Burns believes that Bard is a humble hero like Aragorn, Faramir and Gandalf, all brought into Tolkien's legendarium to replace the powerful unworthy, such as the mayor of Lake-town, Denethor, Boromir and Saruman. In his initial appearance, Bard is shown as a negative character who always sees the worst side of situations, but Sumner G. Hunnewell believes that Bard shows happiness and generosity after the destruction of Lake-town.

== Adaptations ==
=== Film ===
Luke Evans as Bard in a publicity photo for Peter Jackson's The Hobbit: The Battle of the Five Armies

In the 1977 Rankin/Bass animated television musical, Bard was voiced by John Stephenson.

In Peter Jackson's The Hobbit film series, Welsh actor Luke Evans portrays Bard, appearing in the latter two films of the trilogy, The Desolation of Smaug (2013) and The Battle of the Five Armies (2014). Evans was cast in June 2011. Bob Strauss of Los Angeles Daily News felt that Evans' portrayal managed to expand on the character, while Erik Kain of Forbes felt that his portrayal was "solid", but was "never given quite enough breathing room".

=== Other ===
In the 1968 BBC Radio adaptation, Bard was voiced by Peter Williams.

Bard is one of the cards in Iron Crown Enterprises's 1995 Middle-earth Collectible Card Game, which is illustrated by Angelo Montanini.

== Sources ==
- Tolkien, J. R. R. (21 September 1937). The Hobbit. HarperCollins. ISBN 978-0-00-752549-2.
- Tolkien, J. R. R. (20 October 1955). The Lord of the Rings. Boston: Houghton Mifflin Harcourt. ISBN 978-0-61851-765-7.
- Rateliff, John D. (2007a). The History of The Hobbit, Part One: Mr Baggins. HarperCollins. ISBN 978-0-00-723555-1.
- Rateliff, John D. (2007b). The History of The Hobbit, Part Two: Return to Bad-End. HarperCollins. ISBN 978-0-00-725066-0.
- Hammond, Wayne G.; Scull, Christina (2006). The Lord of the Rings 1954-2004: Scholarship in Honor of Richard E. Blackwelder. Marquette University Press. ISBN 978-0-87462-018-4.
