= John Rawls (actor) =

New Zealand actor (born 1972)

- Born: John Rawls; 4 May 1972 (age 53); England
- Occupation: Actor

John Rawls (born 4 May 1972) is an actor from New Zealand.

== Biography ==
Rawls was born in England and raised in Hamilton, New Zealand after moving there at age six. He is known for playing the evil vampire Zurial in David Slade's 2008 vampire film 30 Days of Night. He appeared in the Hobbit films by Peter Jackson as the villain Yazneg through earlier reports stated that he would play another villain called Azog. He is with the acting agency Kathryn Rawlings & Associates, based in Auckland.

== Filmography ==
=== Film ===
Title	Year	Role	Notes
Seven Swords of Wayland	1999	Malakire	
Salt	2006	John	Short film
30 Days of Night	2007	Zurial	
Brave Donkey	2009	Petrol man	Short film
The Warrior's Way	2010	Hell Rider	
The Hobbit: An Unexpected Journey	2012	Yazneg	

=== Television ===
Title	Year	Role	Notes
Cold Feet	2001	Anaesthetist	Episode: "Series 4, Episode 8"
Orange Roughies	2007	Kelvin Richards	Episode: "Series 2, Episode 5"
Legend of the Seeker	2008	Samuel	Episode: "Identity"
Spartacus: Blood and Sand	2010	Byzo	Episode: "The Red Serpent"
The Blue Rose	2013	Karl Villiers	Recurring role (6 episodes)
Westside	2015	Gang Leader	Episode: "Dire Combustion"
