= Esgaroth =

Town in Middle-earth

- The Hobbit location
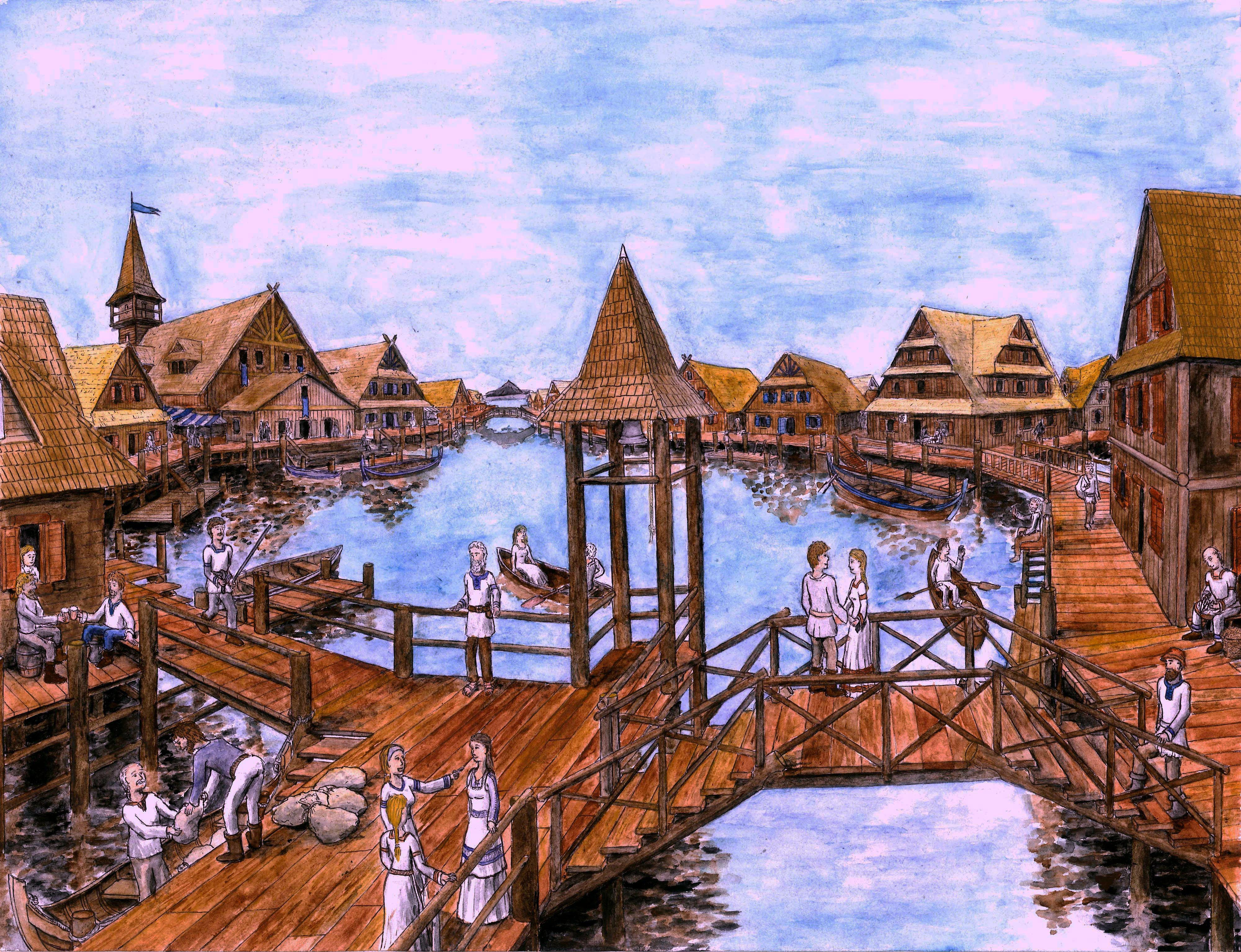
- Artist's conception

In-universe information
- Other name: Lake-town
- Type: Town built upon trade between Men, Elves and Dwarves in northern Middle-earth; Lake city
- Ruled by: Master of Lake-town
- Location: Wilderland

Esgaroth, or Lake-town, is a fictional community of Men upon the Long Lake that appears in the 1937 novel The Hobbit by J. R. R. Tolkien. Constructed entirely of wood and standing upon wooden pillars sunk into the lake-bed, the town is south of the Lonely Mountain and east of Mirkwood. The town's prosperity is apparently built upon trade between the Men who inhabit it, and the Elves and the Dwarves of northern Middle-earth. The chief mode of transport of the people of Esgaroth is stated to be their boats.

At the time in which The Hobbit is set, Esgaroth appears to be a city-state, and a republic with no king (the only real republic shown in Middle-earth). The Master of Lake-town was said in-universe to be elected from among the "old and wise"; scholars have noted that all the same, he was trapped by his greed. Tolkien modelled the town closely on the real Neolithic pile dwellings that were discovered near the Alps in the 19th century.

== Fictional role ==
=== Geography ===
Sketch map of Northeast Mirkwood, showing the Lonely Mountain of Erebor, the River Running, and Esgaroth upon the Long Lake

Esgaroth was located in north-eastern Wilderland, a large inland region of Middle-earth. It was situated on the western shores of the Long Lake, close to the inflow of the Forest River. The Forest River provided an upstream route to Mirkwood. The Lonely Mountain, which could be seen from the town and could be reached by travelling up the Long Lake and then up its northern inflow, the River Running (also called the Celduin). (Note: Tolkien 1955, Appendix A.III "Durin's Folk") The River Running flowed out of the south of the lake, providing a travel route from Esgaroth all the way downstream to the land of Dorwinion on the Sea of Rhûn. (Note: Tolkien 1937, Chapter 10 "A Warm Welcome") It had been preceded by a larger town, also built over the lake on piles that could still be seen during droughts, but Tolkien never wrote any further account of this.

=== Language ===
The inhabitants of Esgaroth knew the language spoken by most of Tolkien's Middle-earth, Westron. Amongst themselves they spoke an ancient form of it, which was loosely related to (but distinct from) the also-ancient language of the Rohirrim. Tolkien "translated" Westron into English in his text, so to represent the ancient relative of it that the Rohirrim spoke, he substituted Old English. Thus, Tolkien substituted Old Norse for the language of the Men of Esgaroth (in person and place names, etc.) because it is an ancient relative of Old English.

=== Master of Lake-town ===
Master of Lake-town is the title given to the elected leader of Esgaroth. The Master of the town when Bilbo and Thorin's Company arrived in The Hobbit was portrayed as a capable businessman, but more than a little greedy and cowardly. He was stated as having run off with a large amount of gold and dying in the epilogue. (Note: Tolkien 1937, "Epilogue")

== Concept and artwork ==
Tolkien's pencil and ink drawing of "Lake Town" for The Hobbit shows either a generic scene or a moment before Bilbo has started to let the Dwarves out of the barrels in which they have arrived.

Tolkien made a series of drawings of Bilbo's escape from the Elves, as he floated with the Dwarves in barrels down to Esgaroth. The finished drawing shows a town on wooden piles above the lake, accessed by a walkway. He modelled the town closely on the neolithic pile dwellings that have been found on Swiss lakes, probably based on an artist's conception of such a town such as in Robert Munro's 1908 Les stations lacustres d'Europe aux ages de la pierre et du bronze. The scholars Wayne G. Hammond and Christina Scull note that in an earlier drawing, two Dwarves can be seen crawling out of their barrels, with Bilbo still invisible as he was wearing the Ring, whereas the finished drawing shows the barrels without Dwarves, perhaps at the moment just before Bilbo started to let them out; an Elf, poling the raft, has been added. The text of The Hobbit states that night had fallen and the Men of the town had gone indoors to eat, while in the drawing, it is still day and swan-headed boats (based, they note, on those in Tolkien's painting The Halls of Manwë for The Silmarillion) are still being rowed about the lake.

== Fictional etymology ==
Compared to Dale, the other town in the valley of the River Running, Esgaroth is the more "mannish" and vernacular settlement. Its masters do not have any elvish-sounding names as the former kings of Dale, nor is Esgaroth a monarchy. This stems from the fact that in the past, Esgaroth was less influenced by the refined Númenorean civilisation than Dale.

The meaning of the name Esgaroth is unclear. While it is not Sindarin, one of Tolkien's elvish languages, it may be "'Sindarized' in shape" as the author himself explained. In early manuscripts, Tolkien provides a root esek meaning "sedge" or "reed" in the early Elvish language of Ilkorin, but reeds are not mentioned in the description of Lake-town that was published in The Hobbit. The name has been compared to the Sumerian word gi meaning reed.

== Analysis ==
From The Pied Piper of Hamelin

At last the people in a body
To the Town Hall came flocking:
'Tis clear, cried they, our Mayor's a noddy;
And as for our Corporation — shocking
To think we buy gowns lined with ermine
For dolts that can't or won't determine
What's like to rid us of our vermin!

— Robert Browning, 1842

Douglas A. Anderson notes in The Annotated Hobbit that Lake-town's Master and councillors possibly derive from Robert Browning's "Mayor and Corporation" in his 1842 poem The Pied Piper of Hamelin. Anderson comments that Tolkien "loathed" the poem, and that in 1931 he wrote a satirical poem called "Progress in Bimble Town" dedicated to the "Mayor and Corporation".

Esgaroth has been interpreted as Tolkien's criticism of capitalism featuring a ruling elite class that exploits the lower-class citizens. The human Master of Lake-Town, like the Dwarf Thorin Oakenshield who has become obsessed with the dragon's hoard, and the dragon Smaug himself, may all three be seen as illustrations of the "greedy, destructive side of capitalism". The Master, however, is rather trapped in his monotonic life of bureaucracy and cronyism, since he is both the chief capitalist and chief politician of the town. On the other hand, Esgaroth does not abandon capitalism after the destruction of Smaug. While the town experiences a new prosperity, the "managerial class" of merchants is not replaced. Although he portrays the highly capitalistical town in a bad light, Tolkien does not advocate a socialist system for the reconstructed Lake-town either. Instead the town's situation at the end of The Hobbit has been called an "orderly liberty".

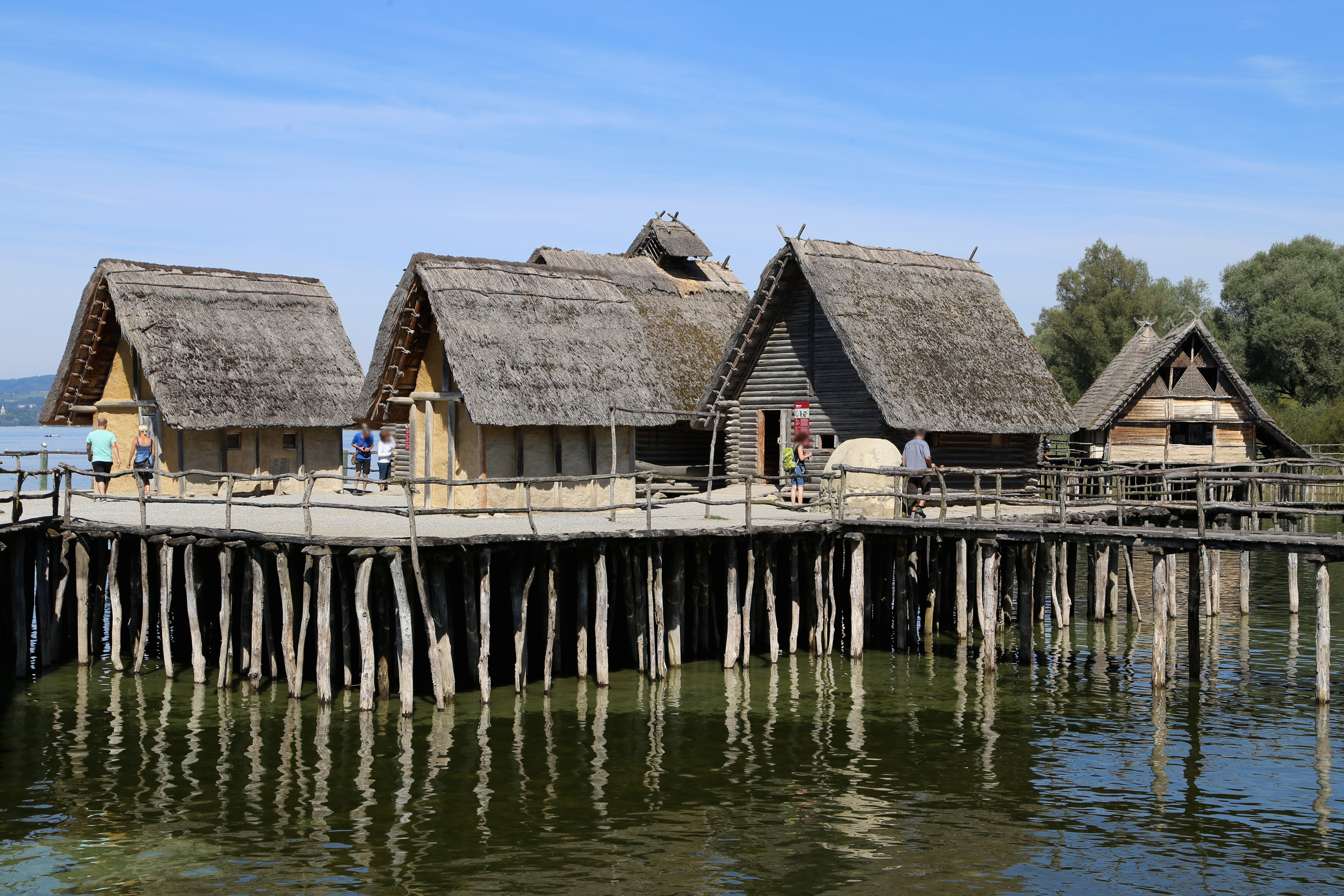
Reconstructed neolithic pile houses on the Bodensee

The archaeologist Deborah Sabo, in Mythlore, calls the description of Lake-town as Bilbo arrives there "perhaps Tolkien's most vivid attempt to model a place in Middle-earth on real-world archaeology". She notes that pile dwellings were discovered at Lake Zurich in 1853–1854 when the water level was unusually low; Ferdinand Keller proposed that the village had been constructed on a platform on piles over the lake, creating "a sensation". By 1900, some hundreds of lake villages had been identified from Britain and Europe, and in a "lake-dwelling craze", children's books and newspaper and magazine articles provided pictures and descriptions of lake villages. In addition, Sabo writes that Tolkien characteristically viewed the past as far better than the present, and that after Smaug has fallen, dying, on the town, destroying it, people avoid the place: "few dared to cross the cursed spot, and none dared to dive into the shivering water or recover the precious stones that fell from his rotting carcase." (Note: Tolkien 1937, Chapter 14 "Fire and Water") She states that in this passage, Tolkien is projecting the tale into the future, when the new town too will be an archaeological site, complete with folklore beliefs about a haunted place containing bones, jewels, and the remains of the piles of the town.

It has been observed that there is an internal division in the minds of the people of Esgaroth. What they remember of the town's glorious past is preserved in songs and tales, but this lore is not considered actual history by the people but rather fiction. A few songs looked into the future foretelling the return of the dwarven kings and a new age of prosperity. The unexpected arrival of Thorin therefore causes great excitement among the Esgarothians who immerse "themselves in a fantasy that is only tangentially connected to the old prophecies ... and is almost completely detached from the world around them." The practical Master is capable of adapting to this new situation by assisting in the composition of new songs from which he profits. Eventually it is Bard though whose voice in the battle against the dragon is the voice of legend when he is revealed as the direct heir of Girion, Lord of Dale.

Master of Lake-town, played by Stephen Fry in Peter Jackson's The Desolation of Smaug

== In other media ==
In Peter Jackson's 2012–2014 The Hobbit film series, Stephen Fry plays the role of the Master of Lake-town in The Hobbit: The Desolation of Smaug and The Hobbit: The Battle of the Five Armies.

In the 2006 strategy game The Battle for Middle-Earth II, the settlement of Esgaroth is featured in the campaign and available for skirmish.
