= Kate Madison =

British filmmaker (born 1978)

- Born: 1978 (age 47–48); Chesham, England
- Occupations: Actor, Film director
- Known for: Born of Hope

Kate Madison (born 1978) is a British independent filmmaker, director, producer and actor. She portrayed the character Elgarain in her film, Born of Hope.

== Background ==
Kate Madison was born in Chesham, Buckinghamshire, England but now lives in Cambridge, England. She started acting at the age of four years when her mother got her involved in a local amateur dramatic group. She was educated at the Netherhall School and Long Road Sixth Form College, both in Cambridge. She gained a bachelor's degree in zoology at Aberystwyth University, but realized this would not be her profession. She discovered and joined the Cambridge Filmmakers Network (CFN) and established her company, Actors at Work Productions in 2003. It was through the CFN she became directly involved in her first two film projects.

== Into the Darkness and The Horsemen ==
In 2005 Madison was working on a short film with the working title Into the Darkness. The lead character, Abigail (played by Jennie Fox) discovers an ancient book desired by Lucifer, and guardian angels must protect her and the mysterious book. Madison co-wrote the screenplay. Shortly after filming began, the director had to return home to the United States. He gave the task of directing to Madison, and he left for Tampa, Florida. "It was very nerve-racking", Madison told Jennie Kermode in an interview for Eye for Film. "I was really in at the deep end. But it turned out to be a really good decision because it was like a crash course in filmmaking and I learned a lot. Through it, I met Christopher Dane, who stars in Born of Hope, and Ollie Goodchild, who also appears in it."

Madison and Dane then collaborated on a short whimsical comedy film with the improbable subject of the four horsemen of the Apocalypse. Dane portrayed Famine, Pestilence, War and Death in different costume and makeup for each. The four horsemen are the only customers at a pub and the hapless waitress, portrayed by Madison, does not know what to make of them. She directed the ten-minute short; Christopher Dane was the producer and screenwriter; the music was by Carl Homer.

== Born of Hope ==
Madison became fascinated with The Lord of the Rings films directed by Peter Jackson; the films were her first exposure to the works of J. R. R. Tolkien. She read Tolkien's own notes on the main characters of Middle Earth, and became intrigued about the mysterious background of Aragorn. "When I was looking for a story to do I found those few paragraphs and the idea of a film about Aragorn's parents and where he came from seemed a great idea", she stated in an interview. "Aragorn is such an important character in The Lord of the Rings but we know hardly anything about him until he turns up in The Prancing Pony in The Fellowship of the Ring." From this creative spark, Madison set out to create what was then known as a fan film. In 2003 she discovered a Tolkien-fan film competition and decided to create a film on Aragorn's roots from the period just before that of the books and films. She began recruiting from her circle of film professionals within Actors at Work Productions, and their referrals of others throughout England and beyond. She brought in a screenwriter to flesh out the storyline, but the script evolved over a period of years and some scenes were rewritten during filming. She scouted for filming locations and discovered the West Stow Anglo-Saxon village and Epping Forest, where most of the scenes were ultimately filmed. Being familiar with Wales from her college days, she chose to film key scenes in the Welsh hills as well. She used the bulk of her own savings to launch the project, and ultimately called on donations to fund the balance. All actors and film crew worked without financial compensation.

"We obviously didn't have very much money to spend so we couldn't exactly hire huge cranes and lights", she told an interviewer in 2010. "Most of our camera operators owned their own cameras and I also borrowed one off friends." By 2006, Madison had produced a trailer which was shown at a Tolkien conference in Toronto, Ontario, Canada. This generated interest in the film and the trailer was a fundraising vehicle. Principal photography finally began in 2008. Madison received offers to assist from professionals from around the world in providing special effects, film scoring, prop and costume donations and cash donations to keep production going. Born of Hope, with a running time of 71 minutes, made its debut at RingCon 2009 in Germany. Madison used the Internet for worldwide release, streamed first on Dailymotion, later on YouTube, and on the film's dedicated website. Madison played Arathorn's friend Elgarain in the film, as well as directing. The character "carries a torch" for Arathorn, demanding a major commitment to acting alongside the other demands on her during the shooting.

== Ren: The Girl with the Mark ==
The online success of Born of Hope with millions of views since its release generated a worldwide following of Madison's creative works. The growth of online streaming media convinced Madison her future projects would best be served through this medium. She established a production company, Mythica Entertainment, to produce these works. The first of these is a new fantasy web series titled Ren: The Girl with the Mark. Ren follows the life of a young girl who is marked on her face by a spirit and who struggles to find the meaning of this mark, whether it is good or evil, and to overcoming the prejudice against her. Learning from her financial trials in filming Born of Hope, Madison launched a funding campaign using Kickstarter, the crowdfunding website, on 20 July 2013 with the goal of raising the £35,000 minimum need. By 19 August the goal was surpassed, raising £36,184. Season One of the series includes five ten-minute episodes, and is produced to be streamed over the web from the Mythica Entertainment website and possibly other online venues. The production team spent the first half of 2014 working on story lines, scouting locations, costume production, and calling for contributors for all aspects of the series. Filming for Season One began in the latter half of 2014 and was completed by mid-November.

The first episode of Season One was uploaded to the Mythica Entertainment YouTube channel in 2016. "It's a great way for an independent film-maker to do something relatively low budget", Madison told the Cambridge News, "and get it out there, and get people watching it. I like the fact that with the web anyone can watch what you make, and that’s how it should be for me."

The principal cast of Ren stars Sophie Skelton as Ren, Nick Cornwall as Dagron (Ren's father), James Malpas as Baynon (Ren's brother), Christopher Dane as Karn, Duran Fulton Brown as Hunter, Grace Parry as Dalia, Alan Hay as Tor Berry, Dita Tan Tang as Lyanna, and Richard Zeman as the Kah'Nath Commander. A DVD with the five episodes is now available.
