= Born of Hope =

2009 British fantasy fan film by Kate Madison

- Poster for the film
- Directed by: Kate Madison
- Written by: Christopher Dane; Kate Madison; Matt Wood
- Screenplay by: Paula DiSante (as Alex K. Aldridge)
- Based on: The Lord of the Rings by J. R. R. Tolkien
- Produced by: Kate Madison
- Starring: Christopher Dane; Beth Aynsley; Danny George; Kate Madison; Andrew McDonald; Philippa Hammond; Iain Marshall; Howard Corlett
- Cinematography: Neill Phillips
- Edited by: Christopher Dane; Kate Madison
- Music by: Tobias Bublat; Adam Langston; Jacob Shelby; Kevin Webster; Rob Westwood; Peter Bateman; Arjan Kiel; Toby and Cody McClure; Martin Westlake
- Production company: Actors at Work Productions
- Release date: 1 December 2009
- Running time: 71 minutes
- Country: United Kingdom
- Language: English
- Budget: £25,000

Born of Hope: The Ring of Barahir (often referred to as simply Born of Hope) is a 2009 British fantasy adventure fan film directed by Kate Madison and written by Paula DiSante (as Alex K. Aldridge) based on the appendices of J. R. R. Tolkien's 1954–55 novel The Lord of the Rings. The film centres on the communities affected by Sauron's war; the Dúnedain bloodline; and the story of Arathorn II and his relationship with Gilraen as they would be the parents of Aragorn, who became a key leader against Sauron.

The bulk of the film was shot at the West Stow Anglo-Saxon Village in Suffolk. It debuted at Ring*Con 2009 before being streamed for free on DailyMotion, and later on YouTube.

The film was largely welcomed by critics, who remarked on the quality of the production, the cast, and the original music. Scholars noted the emphasis on women, with a female narrator and the depiction of women as warriors. The Tolkien Society's Mallorn journal however found the plot too slight for the film's length, and the film too derivative of Peter Jackson's film series.

== Plot ==
In the late Third Age, Sauron's power is increasing, and he has sent his Orcs to seek out the remnants of the bloodline of Elendil, kept alive in the Dúnedain. Dirhael, his wife Ivorwen and their daughter Gilraen are fleeing from an attack on their village when they are ambushed by Orcs on a forest road, and saved by a group of rangers led by Arathorn. Not having any place safer to go, the refugees go with Arathorn to Taurdal, the village led by his father and Chieftain of the Dúnedain, Arador. While there, Arathorn and Arador ponder the orcs' motives after finding various looted rings on their bodies. During her stay in Taurdal, Gilraen falls in love with Arathorn.

In light of the attacks on surrounding settlements, Arador leads his forces on a campaign against the Orcs in the area in an attempt to restore peace to the region. Meanwhile, he sends Arathorn separately in an attempt to determine the meaning behind the attacks. Both are successful, and Arathorn discovers the Orcs are serving Sauron, who seeks the Ring of Barahir. Arathorn and Gilraen receive Arador's blessing to be wed, but Arathorn cannot summon the courage to ask Dirhael for his daughter's hand. Arador is summoned to Rivendell to seek Elrond's counsel, and the wedding is postponed until his return. Arathorn eventually confronts Dirhael, and receives permission to marry his daughter. Arathorn and Gilraen are married.

A year later, Arador is killed by a hill troll in the Coldfells, making Arathorn the chieftain of the Dúnedain. Gilraen becomes pregnant and gives birth to a son, Aragorn. Taurdal knows peace for a while, until the Elves Elladan and Elrohir come with news from Rivendell. Elrond has sensed that danger is once again threatening the region, and they request that Gilraen and Aragorn be brought back to Rivendell for safekeeping, as is the tradition with all Dúnedain heirs to the chiefdom. Before Arathorn and Gilraen can come to a decision, Orcs attack the village. They are beaten off; however, many Rangers fall, and Arathorn's closest friend, Elgarain, is mortally wounded while defending Gilraen. Arathorn then leads the remaining Rangers in pursuit of the stragglers. They are successful, but Arathorn is mortally wounded in the process. Without a chieftain capable of leading them, the Dúnedain abandon Taurdal and go into hiding in small secret settlements in the forests of Rhudaur, while Elladan and Elrohir bring Aragorn with his mother Gilraen to safety in Rivendell.

== Cast ==
- Christopher Dane as Arathorn
- Beth Aynsley as Gilraen, Arathorn's wife
- Iain Marshall as Arador, Chieftain of the Dúnedain and father of Arathorn
- Andrew McDonald as Dirhael, Gilraen's father
- Philippa Hammond as Ivorwen, Gilraen's mother
- Howard Corlett as Halbaron*, Arathorn's right hand and de facto leader of the Dúnedain after his death
- Kate Madison as Elgarain*, a Ranger and friend of Arathorn
- Matt and Sam Kennard as Elladan and Elrohir, twin sons of Elrond
- Luke Johnston as Aragorn, son of Arathorn
- Danny George as Dirhaborn*, a Ranger
- Amani Johara as Evonyn*, Halbaron's wife
- Raphael Edwards as Mallor*, a Ranger
- Ollie Goodchild and Lars Mattes as Halbarad, Halbaron's son
- Phoebe Chambers and Amylea Meiklejohn as Maia*, a refugee escaping from the orcs, adopted by Halbaron and Evonyn
- Tom Quick as Dorlad*, Gilraen's brother who was killed in the raid on their village
- Richard Roberts as Shaknar*, orc leader, chief villain of the film
- Lewis Penfold as Gorganog*, orc commander during attack on Taurdal
- Daniel Tyler-Smith as Maia's father*, killed during an orc raid

*Original characters created for the film.

== Production ==
Kate Madison played Elgarain, a key role in Born of Hope, here with Christopher Dane as Arathorn, as well as directing.

The idea for the film was born in 2003 when director/producer/actor Kate Madison wanted to submit a film for the Tolkien Fan Film Exhibition. Originally a modest plan, it grew until April 2006 when the first test shoot occurred. Principal photography started in June 2008, and continued through 2009. The goal was to debut at Ring*Con 2009, which it did. It was later streamed for free on various video websites including DailyMotion and YouTube. The film had to be non-commercial to avoid legal conflict with the commercial rights holders.

Madison spent her life savings of £8,000 on the film. An extra £17,000 was generated by posting a trailer online, raising the budget to £25,000. Born of Hope was made over a period of six years, using a cast of 400, who would camp in tents so as to be able to shoot early. The bulk of the film was shot at the West Stow Anglo-Saxon Village in Suffolk. Other scenes were shot on locations in Britain, including Epping Forest.

Christopher Dane (Arathorn) became closely involved in the process of making the film, contributing to the script as well as handling the editing of the final product. Madison, who directed and produced the film, was cast as Elgarain as well, giving her a heavy workload during the shooting.

Chris Bouchard of The Hunt for Gollum contributed to the production of the film as a camera operator and effects artist.

== Reception ==
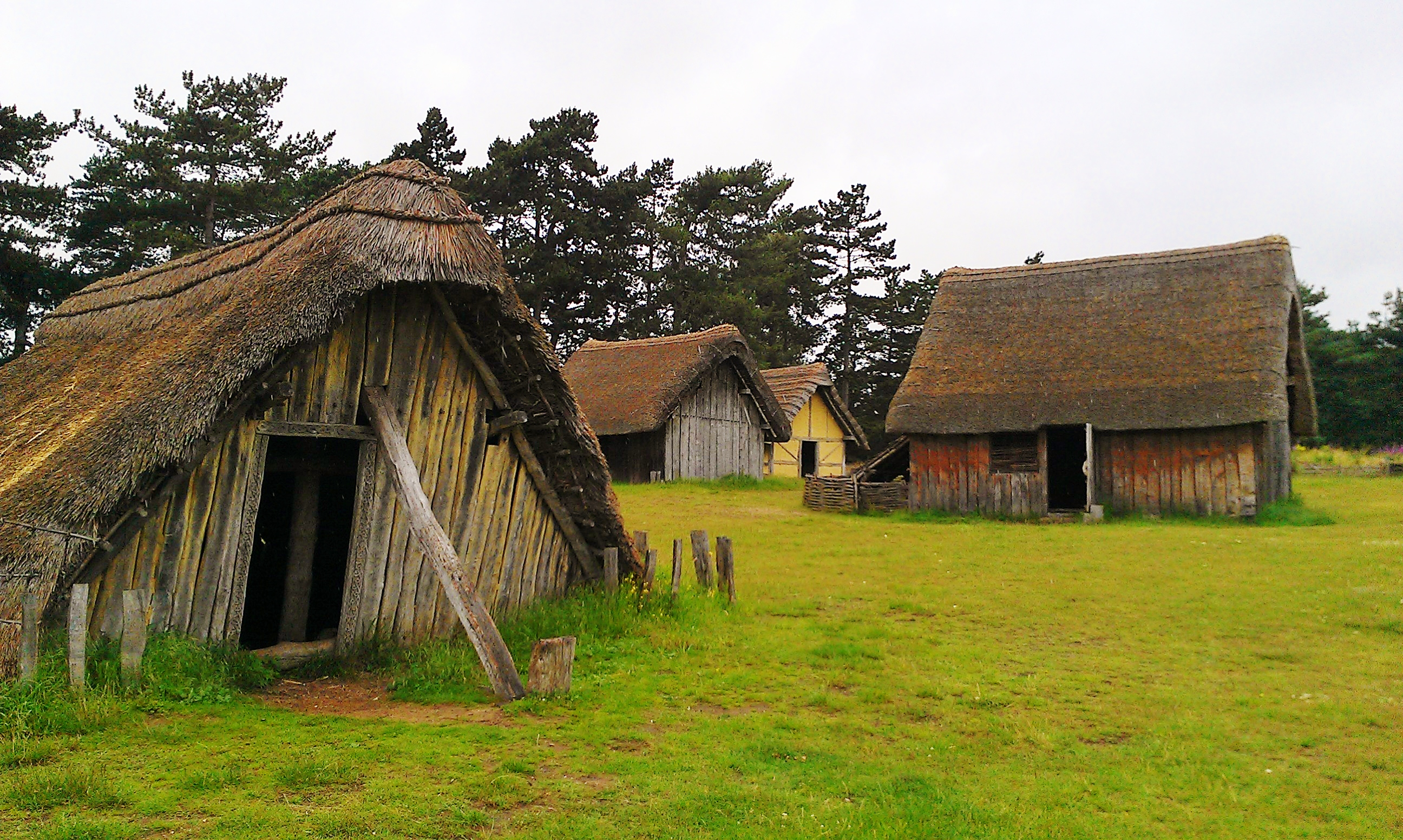
Much of the film was shot at West Stow Anglo-Saxon village.

Wendy Ide, writing for The Times, gives the film a positive review. She awards it 4 stars out of 5, calling it a "near note-perfect homage to Jackson's vision for the Rings". She describes the film as "very well cast", writing that "practically all the performances have a skill level far above that which is usually evident in low-budget cinema". David Goldie notes that the film was crowd-funded.

Tom Lamont, writing in The Observer, states that Born of Hope was the most credible adaptation among the many fan films based on The Lord of the Rings. He agrees with a reviewer in another newspaper who had written "Every shot of this film was made with love, and it shows". He admires the "stirring" original music for orchestra, and notes that in March 2010, the film had reached almost a million hits at online streaming media.

Henry Gee, reviewing the film in the Tolkien Society's Mallorn, writes that like The Hunt for Gollum, Born of Hope expands a back-story from an appendix in The Lord of the Rings. In his view, it "looks lovely" and seems an assured and professional production. He finds it much more "actorly" than the earlier fan film, and more willing to show background and scenery "which allows the film to breathe more". That said, Gee thinks the plot too slight for a 71 minute film, and too much of it is shot in forests: he quotes the cartoon character Obelix's description of them as "untidy places". He concludes that although the film is "a great watch", it is too derivative of Jackson's films.

The Tolkien scholar Robin Anne Reid notes that Born of Hope was unusual among fan films in including more than "one or two women". She states also that the film focuses on a story barely present in The Lord of the Rings, in a process that the scholar Henry Jenkins called "refocalization". She states that this allows attention to be directed to "minor or underused characters", or to romantic relationships. Weronika Łaszkiewicz, analysing Tolkien's depiction of women, notes that the film both has a woman, Gilraen, as its narrator, and portrays women including the Ranger Elgarain as warriors.

== Awards ==
Born of Hope won the 2010 London Independent Film Festival in the category "Best Micro-Budget Feature".
