= Aragorn =

Heroic character from The Lord of the Rings

- Middle-earth character
- First appearance: "Strider"; The Fellowship of the Ring; 1954
- Last appearance: Unfinished Tales; 1980

In-universe information
- Full name: Aragorn II
- Aliases: Elessar ("Elfstone"); Estel ("Hope"); Telcontar ("Strider"); Thorongil ("Eagle of the Star"); Envinyatar ("The Renewer")
- Race: Men
- Affiliation: Dúnedain; Rangers of the North; Rohan as Thorongil; Company of the Ring
- Weapon: Andúril
- Spouse: Arwen Evenstar
- Children: Eldarion, daughters

Aragorn (Note: Sindarin: [ˈaraɡɔrn]) is a fictional character and a protagonist in J. R. R. Tolkien's novel The Lord of the Rings. Aragorn is a Ranger of the North, first introduced with the name Strider and later revealed to be the heir of Isildur, an ancient King of Arnor and Gondor. Aragorn is a confidant of the wizard Gandalf and plays a part in the quest to destroy the One Ring and defeat the Dark Lord Sauron. As a young man, Aragorn falls in love with the immortal elf Arwen, as told in "The Tale of Aragorn and Arwen". Arwen's father, Elrond Half-elven, forbids them to marry unless Aragorn becomes King of both Arnor and Gondor.

Aragorn leads the Company of the Ring following the loss of Gandalf in the Mines of Moria. When the Fellowship is broken, he tracks the hobbits Merry Brandybuck and Pippin Took with the help of Legolas the elf and Gimli the dwarf to Fangorn Forest. He fights in the battle at Helm's Deep and the Battle of the Pelennor Fields. After defeating Sauron's forces in Gondor, he leads the armies of Gondor and Rohan against the Black Gate of Mordor, distracting Sauron's attention and enabling Frodo Baggins and Samwise Gamgee to destroy the One Ring. Aragorn is proclaimed King by the people of Gondor and crowned King of both Gondor and Arnor. He marries Arwen and rules for 122 years.

Tolkien developed the character of Aragorn over a long period, beginning with a hobbit nicknamed Trotter and trying out many names before arriving at a Man named Aragorn. Commentators have proposed historical figures such as King Oswald of Northumbria and King Alfred the Great as sources of inspiration for Aragorn, noting parallels such as spending time in exile and raising armies to retake their kingdoms. Aragorn has been compared to the figure of Christ as King, complete with the use of prophecy paralleling the Old Testament's foretelling of the Messiah. Others have evaluated his literary status using Northrop Frye's classification, suggesting that while the hobbits are in "Low Mimetic" mode and characters such as Éomer are in "High Mimetic" mode, Aragorn reaches the level of "Romantic" hero as he is superior in ability and lifespan to those around him.

Aragorn has appeared in mainstream films by Ralph Bakshi and Rankin/Bass; the film trilogy by Peter Jackson; the fan film The Hunt for Gollum; and in the BBC radio dramatisation of The Lord of the Rings.

== Background ==
Long ago, Sauron, the Dark Lord, made the One Ring, a Ring of Power, to enable him to take control of the whole of Middle-earth. Isildur and his brother Anárion – together with their father Elendil, High King of Gondor and Arnor – joined the Last Alliance of Elves under Gil-galad and Men against Sauron. The Alliance defeated Sauron at the Battle of Dagorlad, and laid siege to Sauron's Dark Tower, Barad-dûr, in Mordor. After seven years, Sauron came out to challenge the Alliance. During the final battle on the slopes of Mount Doom, Elendil and Gil-galad were killed. (Note: Carpenter 2023, #131: Elendil and Gil-galad were "slain in the act of slaying Sauron.") Isildur took up the hilt-shard of Narsil, Elendil's sword, and cut the One Ring from Sauron's hand. Despite the urging of Elrond and Círdan, Gil-galad's lieutenants, Isildur did not destroy the Ring in the fires of Mount Doom, but kept the Ring for himself. The Second Age ended, and Isildur became King of both Arnor in the North and Gondor in the South. Isildur was killed by Orcs soon afterwards, and the Ring was seemingly lost forever. (Note: Tolkien 1977, "Of the Rings of Power and the Third Age", pp. 293–295) (Note: Tolkien 1980, part 3, 1. "The Disaster of the Gladden Fields", pp. 271–287) (Note: Tolkien 1954a, book 2, ch. 2 "The Council of Elrond".)

A son of Anárion became king of Gondor, and Isildur's son, Valandil, became king of Arnor. Nearly two thousand years later, the kingdom of Arnor fell to the evil land of Angmar, and Arvedui, the king of Arnor, died in a shipwreck. After that, the line of the kings of Arnor was maintained by the chieftains of the Dúnedain for over a thousand years. Each chieftain was given a name with the kingly prefix of Ar(a)-, to signify his right to the kingship of Arnor. (Note: Tolkien 1955, Appendix A, I (ii) "The Realms in Exile") The kingdom of Gondor continued, but years later, when the childless King Eärnur was lost, Gondor began to be ruled by stewards. Centuries later, Sauron returned to Mordor and openly declared himself. (Note: Tolkien 1955 Appendix A "The Númenórean Kings")

== Fictional biography ==
=== Early life ===
Sketch map of the north-west of Middle-earth at the end of the Third Age

Aragorn is the son of Arathorn II and his wife Gilraen. Gilraen's mother, Ivorwen, prophesies that if Arathorn II and Gilraen "wed now, hope may be born for our people; but if they delay, it will not come while this age lasts". Aragorn is the heir to the throne of Gondor and of the lost realm of Arnor. (Note: Tolkien 1977, "Of the Rings of Power and the Third Age": "He was Aragorn son of Arathorn, the nine and thirtieth heir in the right line from Isildur, and yet more like Elendil than any before him.") When he is two years old, his father is killed while pursuing orcs.

Aragorn is fostered in Rivendell by Elrond, who is still living in Middle-earth at the end of the Third Age. At the bidding of Elrond, his lineage is kept secret, as Elrond fears he will be killed like his father and grandfather if his identity as Isildur's heir becomes known. Aragorn is renamed Estel ("hope" in Sindarin) to hide his existence from Sauron. During his childhood, he is not told about his heritage.

At the age of 20, after Aragorn has done great deeds in the company of Elrond's sons, Elrond tells him of his ancestry and his true name, and gives him the shards of Elendil's sword, Narsil, and another ancient heirloom, the Ring of Barahir. He withholds the Sceptre of Annúminas, a symbol of the Kingdom of Arnor, from him until he has earned the right to possess it. The following day, Aragorn meets and falls in love with Elrond's daughter, the beautiful elf-maiden Arwen, who has recently returned to Rivendell from her grandparents' home in Lothlorien.

Thereafter, Aragorn assumes his role as the sixteenth Chieftain of the Dúnedain, the Rangers of the North. He goes into the wild and lives with the remnants of his people, whose kingdom, Arnor, had been destroyed centuries before. The Rangers help to guard the Shire, the land of the diminutive hobbits. He becomes known as "Strider" in the Shire and Bree. (Note: Tolkien 1954a, book 1, ch. 10 "Strider") Aragorn meets and befriends Gandalf the wizard.

Aragorn undertakes great journeys, serving in the armies of King Thengel of Rohan and of Ecthelion II, the Steward of Gondor. He conceals his true name and identity. His tasks help to raise morale in the West and to counter the growing threat of Sauron and his allies, and he acquires experience that he later puts to use in the War of the Ring. With a small squadron of ships from Gondor, he leads an assault on Umbar, burning many of the Corsairs' ships and personally killing their lord during the Battle of the Havens. After the victory at Umbar, he ventures alone to the east and south of Middle-earth and continues to work against Sauron.

At the age of 49, Aragorn visits Lothlórien, and again meets Arwen. He gives her the Ring of Barahir. (Note: Tolkien 1955, Appendix B) On the hill of Cerin Amroth, Arwen pledges her hand to him in marriage, renouncing her Elvish lineage and accepting mortality (the "Gift of Men"). Elrond withholds permission to marry his daughter from Aragorn until he is king of both Gondor and Arnor. Elrond fears that in the end, Arwen might find the prospect of death too difficult to bear.

Years later, Gandalf grows suspicious of Bilbo Baggins's magic ring, which he finds to be Sauron's One Ring. (Note: Tolkien 1954a, book 1, ch. 2 "The Shadow of the Past".) Gandalf asks Aragorn to find Gollum, a creature who had previously possessed the Ring. This hunt leads Aragorn across Rhovanion; he finally captures Gollum in the Dead Marshes northwest of Mordor. Aragorn brings Gollum to King Thranduil's halls in Mirkwood, where Gandalf questions him.

=== The War of the Ring ===
Aragorn meets Frodo Baggins, Bilbo's adopted heir, and three of Frodo's friends at the Prancing Pony Inn in Bree. The four hobbits had set out from the Shire to bring the One Ring to Rivendell. Frodo and his friends were hoping to meet Gandalf at the Prancing Pony, but he was not there. A letter from Gandalf helps convince Frodo to trust Aragorn. Aragorn is 87 years old, nearing the prime of life for a Númenórean. With Aragorn's help, the hobbits reach Rivendell despite being pursued by the Nazgûl, servants of Sauron. (Note: Tolkien 1954a, book 1, ch. 12 "Flight to the Ford")

At Rivendell, Aragorn is chosen as a member of the Fellowship of the Ring to accompany Frodo in his quest to destroy the Ring in the fires of Mount Doom in the land of Mordor. Elven-smiths reforge the shards of Narsil into a new sword, setting into the design of the blade seven stars (for Elendil) and a crescent moon (for Isildur), as well as many runes. Aragorn renames the sword Andúril, "Flame of the West". (Note: Tolkien 1954a, book 3, ch. 3 "The Ring goes South")

The Fellowship attempts to cross the Misty Mountains via the pass of Caradhras, but a violent storm forestalls them. Instead, the Fellowship travels through the mines of Moria. When Gandalf is killed fighting a Balrog, (Note: Tolkien 1954a, book 2, ch. 5 "The Bridge of Khazad-dûm") Aragorn leads the company to Lothlórien (Note: Tolkien 1954a, book 2, ch. 6 "Lothlórien") and down the River Anduin to the Falls of Rauros. He plans to go to Gondor to aid its people in the war against Sauron. (Note: Tolkien 1954a, book 2, ch. 9 "The Great River")

The Fellowship is then broken: Frodo continues his journey southeast toward Mordor, accompanied only by his gardener and friend, hobbit Samwise Gamgee. The two other hobbit members of the Fellowship, Merry Brandybuck and Pippin Took, are captured by orcs. (Note: Tolkien 1954, book 3, ch. 1 "The Departure of Boromir") Aragorn decides that Frodo and the Ring are beyond his help; he, Legolas, and Gimli, calling themselves the Three Hunters, instead set off to track the orcs northwest hoping to rescue Merry and Pippin. They learn that the orcs have been killed and that no survivors were found. (Note: Tolkien 1954, book 3, ch. 2 "The Riders of Rohan") Nevertheless, clues lead Aragorn to believe that the hobbits are still alive, prompting him to take the party into Fangorn Forest. They meet Gandalf, sent back from death to continue his duties in Middle-earth, who tells them that the hobbits are in the care of the Ents. (Note: Tolkien 1954 book 3, ch. 5, "The White Rider")

'I serve no man', said Aragorn; 'but the servants of Sauron I pursue into whatever land they may go... I am not weaponless'. Aragorn threw back his cloak. The elven-sheath glittered as he grasped it, and the bright blade of Andúril shone like a sudden flame as he swept it out. 'Elendil!' he cried. 'I am Aragorn son of Arathorn and am called Elessar, the Elfstone, Dúnadan, the heir of Isildur Elendil's son of Gondor. Here is the Sword that was Broken and is forged again! Will you aid me or thwart me? Choose swiftly!'

— J.R.R. Tolkien, The Two Towers

Gandalf and the Three Hunters travel to Edoras in Rohan, where Gandalf frees King Théoden from the enchantment of the treacherous wizard Saruman and helps him prepare the Rohirrim to fight against Saruman. (Note: Tolkien 1954, book 3, ch. 6 "The King of the Golden Hall") Aragorn fights with the men of Rohan at the Battle of Helm's Deep, in which Saruman's army of orcs is destroyed. (Note: Tolkien 1954, book 3, ch. 7 "Helm's Deep") Aragorn uses the palantír, a seeing stone, to reveal himself to Sauron as the heir of Isildur, to distract him from Frodo's approach to Mordor, and to draw Sauron's forces out of Mordor. Aragorn's action causes Sauron to launch his assault on the city of Minas Tirith prematurely. To reach the city in time to defend it, Aragorn takes the Paths of the Dead, summoning the Dead Men of Dunharrow. The Dead Men owed allegiance to Aragorn as the heir of Isildur; it had been prophesied by Isildur and Malbeth the Seer that the Dead would one day be summoned to pay their debt for betraying Gondor. (Note: Tolkien 1955, book 5, ch. 2 "The Passing of the Grey Company")

With their aid, Aragorn defeats the Corsairs of Umbar at the port of Pelargir. Aragorn releases the Dead Men and uses the Corsairs' ships to sail up the Anduin to Minas Tirith with his Rangers and a large contingent of men from the southern regions of Gondor. (Note: Tolkien 1955, book 5, ch. 9 "The Last Debate") As they approach Minas Tirith, Aragorn unfurls the royal standard that Arwen had made for him, showing both the White Tree of Gondor and the jewelled crown and seven stars of the House of Elendil. With the help of the southern forces, the armies of Gondor and Rohan rally and defeat Sauron's army in the Battle of the Pelennor Fields. (Note: Tolkien 1955, book 5, ch. 6 "The Battle of the Pelennor Fields")

Aragorn's daring and success had brought him closer to his own kingship, which was his by right as a direct descendant of Isildur. Gondor had been under the rule of the Stewards of Gondor for centuries, and it was doubted that any of the royal line still lived. The Steward Denethor, who years before had seen Aragorn (then known as Thorongil) as a rival for his father's favour, declares that he will not bow to a descendant of Isildur. Believing that it is futile to battle Sauron, Denethor has himself burned on a funeral pyre. (Note: Tolkien 1955, book 5, ch. 7 "The Pyre of Denethor")

Aragorn heals Faramir, Denethor's heir, who had been wounded in battle and was expected to die, using the herb athelas. Faramir recognizes Aragorn as his lord and the rightful heir to the throne of Gondor. Aragorn's humility and self-sacrifice win him the hearts of the inhabitants of Gondor's capital city. His healing abilities are noted by the people of Gondor; as the wise-woman and healer Ioreth says, "The hands of the King are the hands of a healer, and so shall the rightful king be known". The people hail Aragorn as King that same evening. (Note: Tolkien 1955, book 5, ch. 8 "The Houses of Healing")

Despite his immediate success and popularity, he leaves Minas Tirith to avoid internal conflict, refusing to enter it again until he was crowned King. To give Frodo the best chance of fulfilling his quest, Aragorn leads an army to make a diversionary feint on the Black Gate of Mordor, leading to the Battle of the Morannon. The army has no realistic chance of victory in battle, and Sauron attacks with overwhelming force. (Note: Tolkien 1955, book 5, ch. 10 "The Black Gate Opens") The Ring is destroyed in Mount Doom while the battle rages at the Black Gate, permanently ending the power of Sauron, whose forces are utterly vanquished. (Note: Tolkien 1955, book 6, ch. 4 "The Field of Cormallen")

Upon Sauron's defeat, Aragorn is crowned King Elessar ("Elfstone", a Quenya name given to him by Arwen's grandmother, Galadriel); he marries Arwen at midsummer. He becomes the twenty-sixth King of Arnor, the thirty-fifth King of Gondor, and the first High King of the Reunited Kingdom of Gondor and Arnor. His line is called the House of Telcontar (Quenya for "Strider"). (Note: Tolkien 1955, book 6, ch. 5 "The Steward and the King")

Aragorn rules the Kingdoms of Gondor and Arnor until year 120 of the Fourth Age. His reign is marked by a renewal of cooperation between Men, Elves, and Dwarves, bringing harmony and prosperity. Aragorn leads the forces of the Reunited Kingdom on military campaigns against the Easterlings and Haradrim, re-establishing rule over lands that Gondor had lost in previous centuries. He dies at the age of 210, after 122 years as king. The graves of Merry and Pippin (who had died in Gondor 58 years earlier) are set beside his. He is succeeded on the throne by his son, Eldarion. Arwen, heartbroken by the loss of her husband, dies shortly afterwards in Lothlórien.

== Concept and creation ==
=== Identity ===
The "first germ" of the character that later evolved into Aragorn or Strider was a peculiar hobbit met by Bingo Bolger-Baggins (precursor of Frodo Baggins) at the inn of The Prancing Pony. His description and behaviour were however already quite close to the final story, with the difference that the hobbit wore wooden shoes, and was nicknamed Trotter for the "clitter-clap" sound that they produced. He was described as "one of the wild folk – rangers", and he played the same role in Frodo's journey to Rivendell as in The Lord of the Rings. (Note: Tolkien 1988, pp. 137–138)

Tolkien hesitated about the true identity of "Trotter" for a long time. One of his notes suggested that the Rangers should not be hobbits as originally planned, and that this would mean that Trotter was either a man, or a hobbit who associated himself with the Rangers and was "very well known" (within the story). (Note: Tolkien 1988, pp. 223–224) The latter suggestion was linked to an early comment of Bingo: "I keep on feeling that I have seen him somewhere before". (Note: Tolkien 1988, p. 208) Tolkien considered that Trotter might be Bilbo Baggins himself, but soon rejected that idea after Aragorn identified himself.

Another suggestion was that Trotter was Fosco Took (Bilbo's first cousin), who "vanished when a lad, owing to Gandalf". Tolkien elaborated this story, making Trotter a nephew of Bilbo, named Peregrin Boffin, and an elder cousin of Frodo. He was said to have run away after he came of age, (Note: Tolkien 1988, pp. 371, 385) some 20 years before Bilbo left the Shire, and had helped Gandalf in tracking Gollum later. A hint was also given as to why Trotter wore wooden shoes: he had been captured by the Dark Lord in Mordor and tortured, but saved by Gandalf; Tolkien added a note in the margin, saying that it would later be revealed that Trotter had wooden feet. (Note: Tolkien 1988, pp. 401, 413)

Tolkien eventually discarded his conception of Trotter as a hobbit. Another short-lived idea was to make Trotter "a disguised elf-friend of Bilbo's in Rivendell", and a scout from Rivendell who "pretends to be a ranger". It was not until after Book I was written that Tolkien settled on making Trotter a man, introducing him from the beginning as Aragorn, a "descendant of the ancient men of the North, and one of Elrond's household".

=== Development ===
The development of Aragorn's connection to Gondor was long and complex, as was his association with Boromir. Initially, it is said that Aragorn's forefathers were the exiles of Númenor who ruled over the people of Ond (the early name of Gondor) but were driven out by the Witch-king of Angmar "when Sauron raised a rebellion". (Note: Tolkien 1989, p. 116) The story of the two branches of Elendil's descendants ruling over two kingdoms of Men through many generations only emerged gradually; at one time, Tolkien even seems to have conceived only three generations between Isildur and Aragorn. (Note: Tolkien 1989, pp. 360–361)

Aragorn's relationship with Arwen was established very late in the writing. When Tolkien first introduced Éowyn, the interest she showed towards Aragorn was not one-sided, with suggestions in notes that they would marry at the end of the story. Another proposal was that Éowyn would die to save or avenge Théoden, and Aragorn would never marry after her death. (Note: Tolkien 1989, pp. 445–448)

The first mention of Elrond's daughter, named Finduilas, was made in reference to the banner she made for Aragorn, (Note: Tolkien 1990, p. 307) but Tolkien did not give any hint whether she had any further part to play. The references to her marriage with Aragorn came later, (Note: Tolkien 1990, pp. 425–426) but it was explicitly stated only near the completion of the book. Only in his work on the appendices for The Lord of the Rings did Tolkien record the full Tale of Aragorn and Arwen. (Note: Tolkien 1996, pp. 262–270)

A passing idea was that Galadriel gave her Ring to Aragorn, and that he would accordingly be titled the "Lord of the Ring".

=== Names ===
Tolkien retained the original nickname "Trotter" through much of the writing of The Lord of the Rings, deciding to change it to "Strider" only after the story was completed. He tried several experimental translations of "Trotter" to Sindarin: Padathir, Du-finnion, and Rimbedir, with Ethelion possibly an equivalent of "Peregrin" (Boffin). (Note: Tolkien 1988, pp. 476, 478, 488–489) Before the later title "the Dúnadan" ("Man of the West") emerged, he used Tarkil (Quenya for "noble Man") as a synonym for Númenórean. (Note: Tolkien 1989, p. 499) The Tolkien scholar Tom Shippey comments that Tolkien "stuck determinedly to the increasingly inapposite name 'Trotter', even writing in the defence of it which was to survive into the finished version of The Lord of the Rings as the defence of 'Telcontar'".

Tolkien hesitated for some time over Strider's "real" name. Although Aragorn was the first suggestion when his Mannish descent was determined, he changed the name repeatedly. The name Aragorn itself comes from the Sindarin root ara- meaning 'noble' or 'royal', reinforcing his identity as a destined king. At one point Tolkien decided that an Elvish name did not suit a Man, and thus altered it from Aragorn via "Elfstone" to "Ingold", an Old English name with "ing-" representing "West". Later he introduced a new plot element: Galadriel's gift of a green stone, and reverted to Elfstone to make an additional connection. (Note: Tolkien 1989, pp. 277–278) Elfstone is the Quenya name Elessar, which becomes Aragorn's royal title. (Note: Tolkien 1980 p. 433 "Elessar" (1) and (2))

Among other names, Tolkien considered "Elfstan", "Elfmere", "Elf-friend", "Elfspear", "Elfwold" and "Erkenbrand", with Elvish forms: Eldamir, Eldavel, Eledon, Qendemir. The name of Aragorn's father also passed through many transient forms: Tolkien paired Aramir or Celegorn with Aragorn before settling upon Arathorn; among the various pairings were "Elfhelm" and Eldakar with "Elfstone" and Eldamir; and Ingrim with "Ingold".

== Analysis ==
=== Conjectured historical basis ===
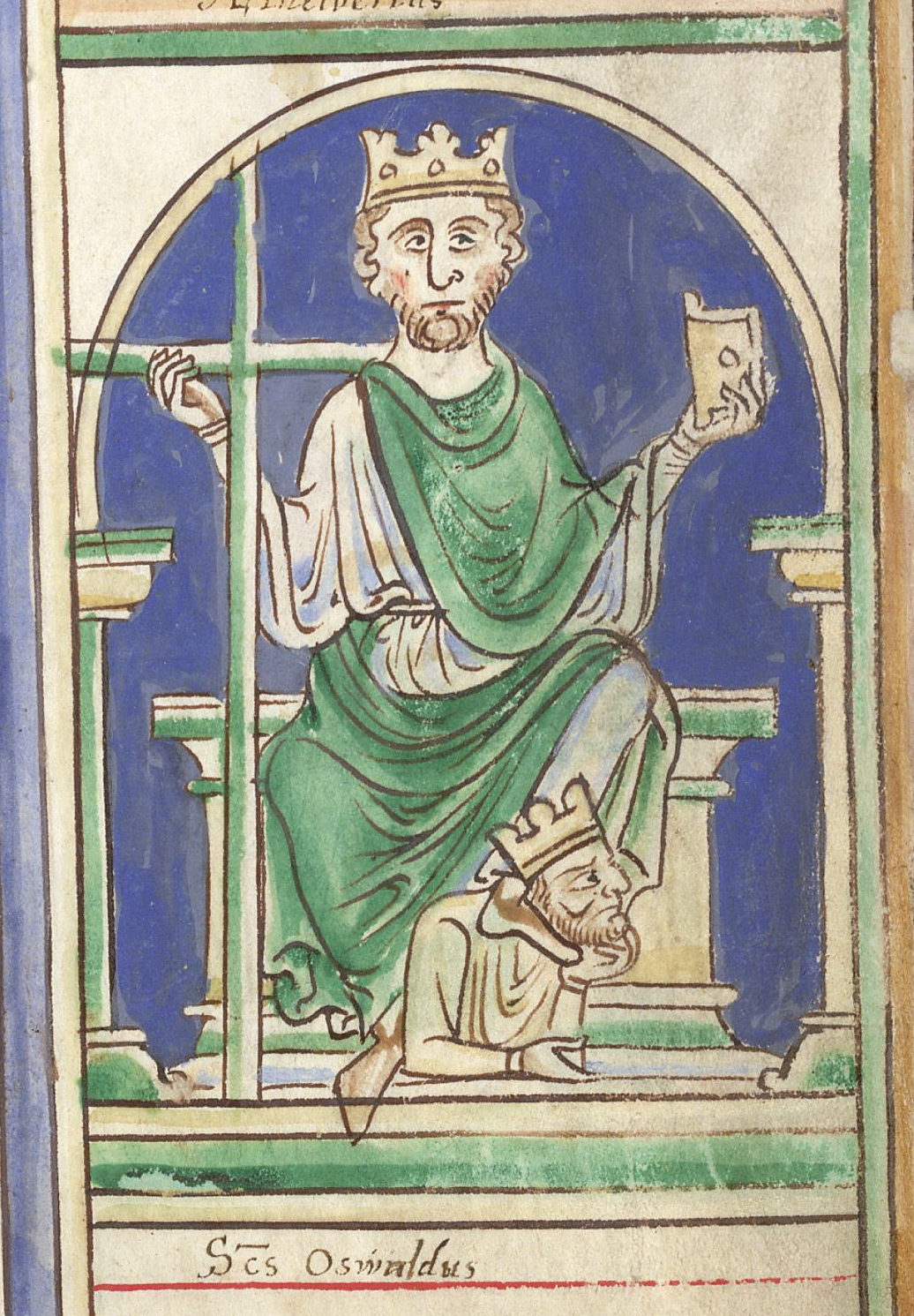
Max Adams suggested that Tolkien based Aragorn on the saint and king Oswald of Northumbria.

The archaeologist Max Adams suggests that Tolkien may have based Aragorn on Oswald, a prince of the Northumbrian royal house exiled to the Kingdom of Dál Riata after Cadwallon King of Gwynedd and Penda King of Mercia laid waste to his ancestral homelands. Oswald returned years later with a raised army of Anglian exiles and retook his kingdom, slaying Cadwallon in the process.

The French medievalist Alban Gautier, and separately the historian Christopher Snyder, suggest a connection with a different Anglo-Saxon king, Alfred of Wessex, described by Snyder as "an unexpected monarch (he had four elder brothers) and inspirational leader who united disparate peoples". The Dutch medievalist Thijs Porck writes that Alfred, like Aragorn, spent time in exile. Danes attacked him in Chippenham, and he took refuge in the wilds before gathering an army at Egbert's Stone and defeating the Danes at the Battle of Edington. Alfred's history parallels Aragorn's gathering of the Dead, the Oathbreakers, at the Stone of Erech.

Thijs Porck's comparison of Aragorn with King Alfred
Aragorn	Alfred the Great
Years in exile	Refuge in the wilds after Danes attacked him at Chippenham
Gathering of the Dead, the Oathbreakers, at the Stone of Erech	Gathered an army at Egbert's Stone
Defeated Mordor at the Battle of the Pelennor Fields	Defeated the Danes at the Battle of Edington

The fragmentation of the Dúnedain kingdoms, leading to Aragorn's small band of Rangers living in the wild, has been compared to that of the early Frankish kingdoms.

The Catholic author Joseph Pearce and others have conjectured, without evidence, that Aragorn's name is derived from the Kingdom of Aragon, and leaders such as Catherine of Aragon whose heritage is linked to the crown of Castile and crown of Aragon.

=== Christ-figure ===
Aragorn has been called a Christ-as-King character; Tolkien's use of prophecy has been compared to the Old Testament's foretelling of the coming of the Messiah. It has been suggested that some of the Christian themes extrapolated from Tolkien's work were not intentional, but resulted from the interplay between the background he grew up in and the myths that inspired him. However, aspects of Aragorn's character - his ability to heal, his sacrificial journey, and his experiences with death and the dead - have long been seen as clues to overt Messianic overtones.

Karen Nikakis writes that Aragorn fits a "sacrificial king" archetype, noting the multiple sacrifices that Aragorn makes for the benefit of those around him and for his future people. Those sacrifices include waiting to claim his throne and to marry Arwen until the One Ring had been destroyed.

=== Ranger ===
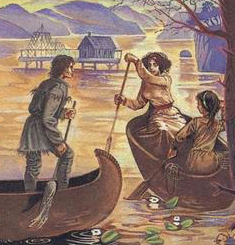
Aragorn has been likened to the ranger Natty Bumppo (left) in James Fenimore Cooper's 1823–1841 Leatherstocking Tales.

Thomas Kullmann and Dirk Siepmann comment that Aragorn's pathfinding lifestyle and style of speech resembles that of the ranger Natty Bumppo in James Fenimore Cooper's 1823–1841 Leatherstocking Tales, suggesting that Aragorn's "If I read the sign back yonder rightly" could easily have been spoken by Bumppo. On the other hand, they write, Aragorn's awareness of "a historical and mythological past", and his continuity with those, is "emphatically lacking" in Cooper's writings.

=== Romantic hero ===
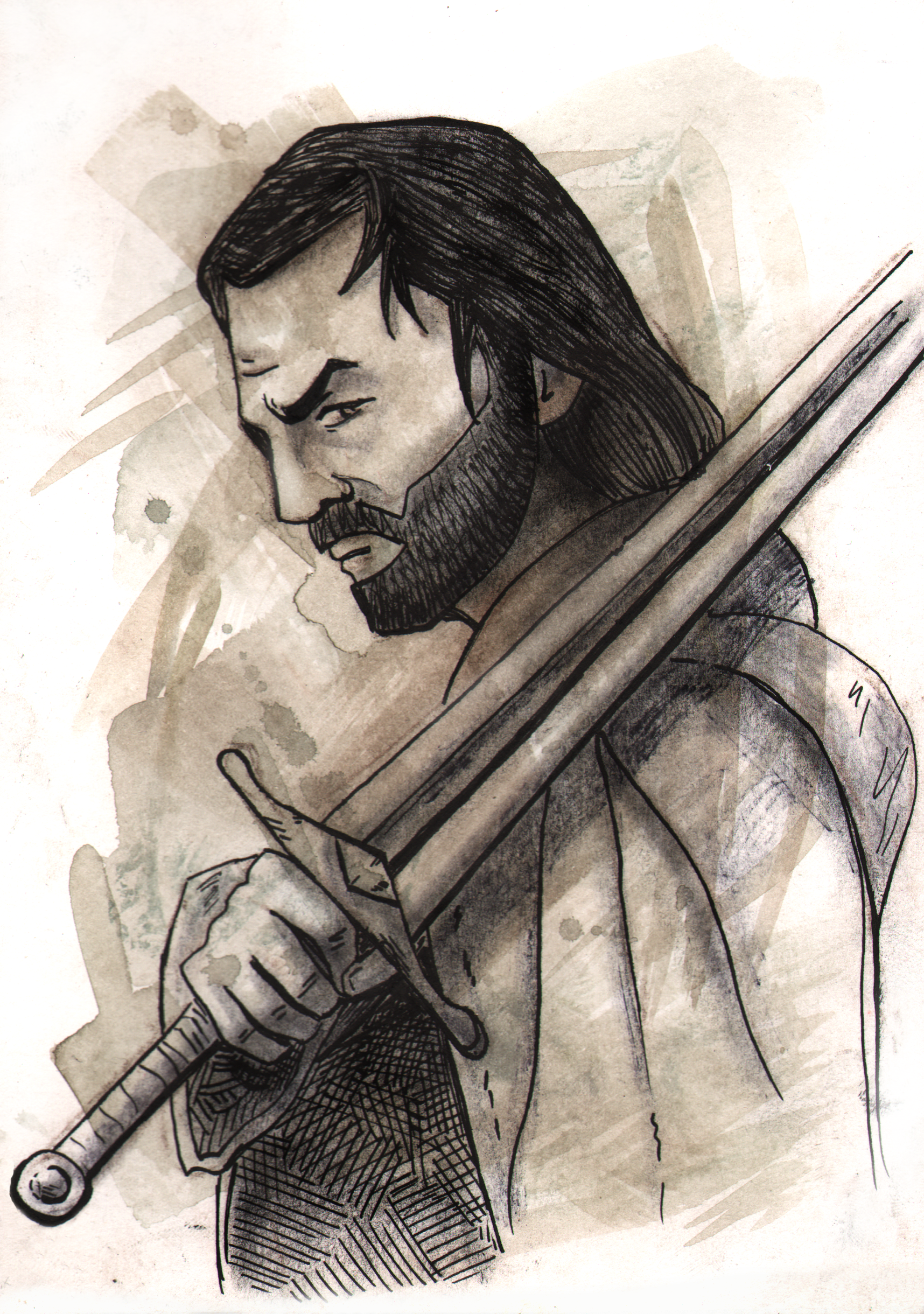
A fan's illustration of Aragorn

The Tolkien scholar Tom Shippey evaluates the literary status of Aragorn and The Lord of the Rings using Northrop Frye's Anatomy of Criticism. He writes that figures like Éomer of Rohan and Faramir of Gondor are, in Frye's terms, "superior in degree to other men but not to their natural environment", which places them in Frye's "High Mimetic" literary mode. The hobbits are often in "Low Mimetic" mode, or even (like Bilbo) "Ironic". Aragorn, Shippey states, while not being a "Mythic" figure, is superior to his environment. Shippey points out that he can run 135 miles in three days and lives "in full vigour" for over 200 years. This places him in Frye's "Romantic" mode. Tolkien does come close to myth, Shippey suggests, when Gandalf confronts the leader of the Nazgûl at the gate of Minas Tirith and a cock crows "as if" signalling the arrival of the Rohan cavalry, just as a crowing cock signalled the Resurrection to Simon Peter in the Bible.

Tom Shippey's analysis of Aragorn's place in Northrop Frye's literary modes
Literary mode	Middle-earth example
Mythic	Hints and allusions, e.g. cock-crow as Rohan cavalry arrives to save Gondor
Romantic	Aragorn's physical stamina, lifespan
High Mimetic	Heroic figures like Éomer of Rohan, Faramir of Gondor
Low Mimetic	Hobbits, especially at start
Ironic	Bilbo Baggins, joking

The Tolkien scholar Verlyn Flieger contrasts the warrior-hero Aragorn with the suffering hero Frodo Baggins. Aragorn is, like Beowulf, an epic/romance hero, a bold leader and a healer-king. Frodo is "the little man of fairy tale", the little brother who unexpectedly turns out to be brave. But the fairy tale happy ending comes to Aragorn, marrying the beautiful princess (Arwen) and winning the kingdom (Gondor and Arnor); while Frodo, who returns home miserable, with neither Ring nor appreciation by the people of the Shire, gets "defeat and disillusionment—the stark, bitter ending typical of the Iliad, Beowulf, the Morte D'Arthur". In other words, Flieger argues, the two types of hero are not only contrasted, but combined, halves of their legends swapped over. Flieger comments that the two together mark the end of the old, with Frodo's bitter end and the disappearance of the Ring, the Elves, and much else that was beautiful; and the start of the new, with Aragorn's rise to the throne of Gondor and Arnor, and a world of Men.

== Adaptations ==
=== Film ===
Aragorn in Ralph Bakshi's animated version of The Lord of the Rings

Aragorn was voiced by John Hurt in Ralph Bakshi's 1978 animated film version of The Lord of the Rings, and by Theodore Bikel in the 1980 Rankin/Bass animated version of The Return of the King, made for television. Kari Väänänen portrayed him in the 1993 Finnish television miniseries Hobitit.

Aragorn in the Rankin/Bass animated production of The Return of the King

Viggo Mortensen as Aragorn in Peter Jackson's film adaptation of The Lord of the Rings.

In Peter Jackson's the Lord of the Rings film trilogy, Aragorn was played by the Danish-American actor Viggo Mortensen. He received acclaim for the portrayal, and Aragorn was ranked No. 15 in Empire's 2015 survey of greatest film characters. Jackson's portrayal of Aragorn introduced an element of anachronism in comparison to Tolkien's book, where he is depicted as an assertive, heroic warrior-king. Instead, Jackson depicts Aragorn as an emotionally sensitive and reluctant heir. This was to connect with a modern audience, for whom medieval heroism is at best remote.

In 2026, Jamie Dornan was cast to play Strider/Aragorn in The Lord of the Rings: The Hunt for Gollum (2027) directed by Andy Serkis.

=== Fan film responses ===
In the 2009 fan film The Hunt for Gollum, Aragorn is portrayed by Adrian Webster. The film is set during the time of The Fellowship of the Ring. It takes place after Gandalf has discovered the true nature of Bilbo's ring and just before Frodo leaves the Shire for Rivendell. Another fan film, Kate Madison's 2009 Born of Hope, imagines a time in the life of Aragorn's parents from shortly before they are married to his father's early death.

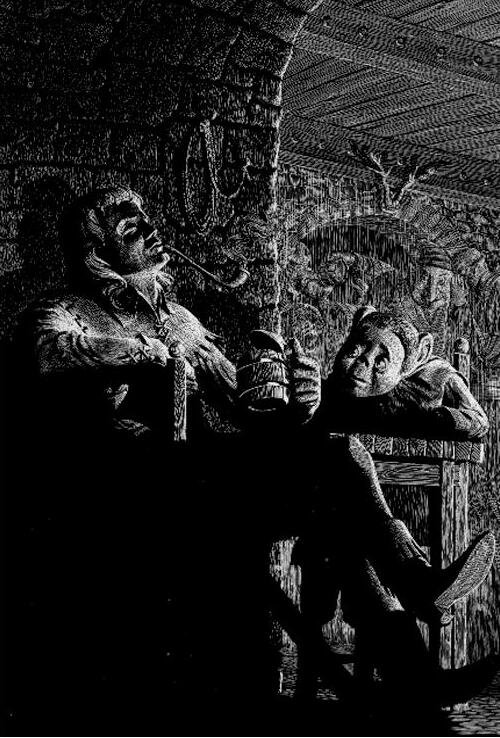
Frodo meeting Strider in The Prancing Pony. Scraperboard engraving by Alexander Korotich, 1981

The film scholar Maria Alberto writes that such fan films reveal one way that readers engage with Tolkien's writings. In her view, Born of Hope, six years in the making, comes close to a canonical narrative, while Hunt for Gollum expands a canonical incident. Alberto notes, too, that Born of Hope nods to Mortensen's physical appearance as Aragorn in both casting and costume. As for Hunt for Gollum, Alberto writes, the narrative arc requires the viewer to know from the Lord of the Rings why Aragorn would be searching for Gollum, while his meeting Gandalf in a pub plainly recalls "both Tolkien's and Jackson's" Prancing Pony.

Alberto states that the widely-scattered locations, from North Wales to Epping Forest and Hampstead Heath are meant to be seen as a measure of how far Aragorn travels, and in which part of the world, as he seeks Gollum. She cites the scholar Robin Anne Reid's remark that "Hunt is 'imitative' where Hope is transformative", meaning that the former attempts to mimic Jackson and Tolkien, whereas the latter sees fans interpreting and adding to the canon.

=== Other ===
In Brian Sibley's 1981 BBC radio dramatisation of The Lord of the Rings, Aragorn was played by Robert Stephens. Sibley writes that Stephens gave "a mercurial performance, combining nobility and humanity in his portrayal of the returning king whose fate, along with that of all Middle-earth, [hung] on the success or failure of Frodo's quest." On stage, Aragorn was portrayed by Evan Buliung in the three-hour production of The Lord of the Rings, which opened in 2006 in Toronto, Ontario, Canada.

In the 1969 parody Bored of the Rings, Aragorn is portrayed as "Arrowroot son of Arrowshirt". In 2023, the expansion set The Lord of the Rings: Tales of Middle-earth was released for the collectible card game Magic: The Gathering. Its depiction of Aragorn as a black man has drawn both praise and criticism from fans of The Lord of the Rings.

In 1981, the Soviet era Russian artist Alexander Korotich made a series of scraperboard engravings to illustrate The Lord of the Rings, including one of Frodo meeting Strider in The Prancing Pony. He was one of several Soviet era artists to present a distinctively non-Anglocentric vision of Middle-earth.

Royal titles
Dormant Title last held by Isildur as High-King of the Númenorean Realms in Exile	King of the Reunited Kingdom; TA 3019 - FA 120	Succeeded by Eldarion
Dormant Title last held by Arvedui	King of Arnor; TA 3019 - FA 120	Succeeded by Eldarion
Vacant Title last held by Eärnur	King of Gondor; TA 3019 - FA 120	Succeeded by Eldarion
Titles of nobility
Preceded by Arathorn II	Chieftain of the Dúnedain of Arnor; TA 2933 - 3019	In abeyance Restored the Kingship
Military offices
Unknown Last known title holder: Gil-galad	Captain of the Host of the West; TA 3019	Unknown
