= West Stow Anglo-Saxon Village =

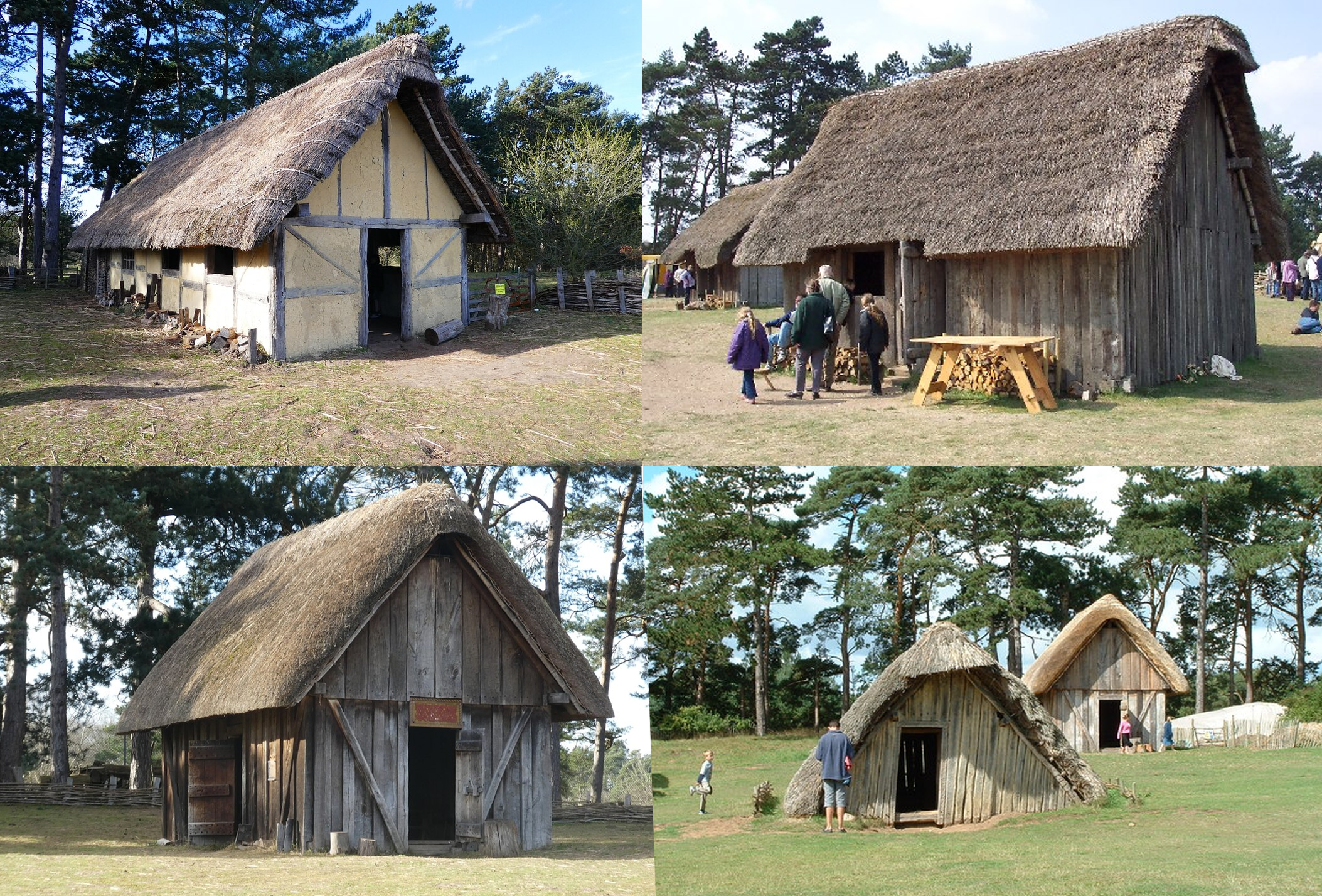
- Reconstructed buildings at West Stow Anglo-Saxon Village

- Location within Suffolk
- Established: 1999
- Location: West Stow, Suffolk
- Coordinates: 52°18′38.19″N 0°38′6.91″E
- Type: Archaeological open-air museum
- Website: West Stow Anglo-Saxon Village

West Stow Anglo-Saxon Village is an archaeological site and an open-air museum located near to West Stow in Suffolk, eastern England. Evidence for intermittent human habitation at the site stretches from the Mesolithic through the Neolithic, Bronze Age, Iron Age and Romano-British period, but it is best known for the small village that existed on the site between the mid-5th century and the early 7th century CE, during the early Anglo-Saxon period. During this time, around 70 sunken-featured buildings were constructed on the site, along with 8 halls and a number of other features. Subsequently, abandoned, the area became farmland in the late medieval period.

Antiquarian interest in the site began in 1849, when a nearby Anglo-Saxon cemetery was discovered. Subsequent excavations of Romano-British pottery kilns took place in the late 19th and mid-20th centuries, before the Anglo-Saxon settlement was revealed. The site was excavated between 1956 and 1972 by an archaeological team from the Ministry of Public Building and Works (MOPBW), led first by Vera Evison and then by Stanley West. Following the culmination of excavation, it was decided to reconstruct the village on the site, an experimental archaeological project which has been ongoing since 1974. In 1999, the site was opened to the public with a new visitor's centre, museum and cafe.

== Location ==
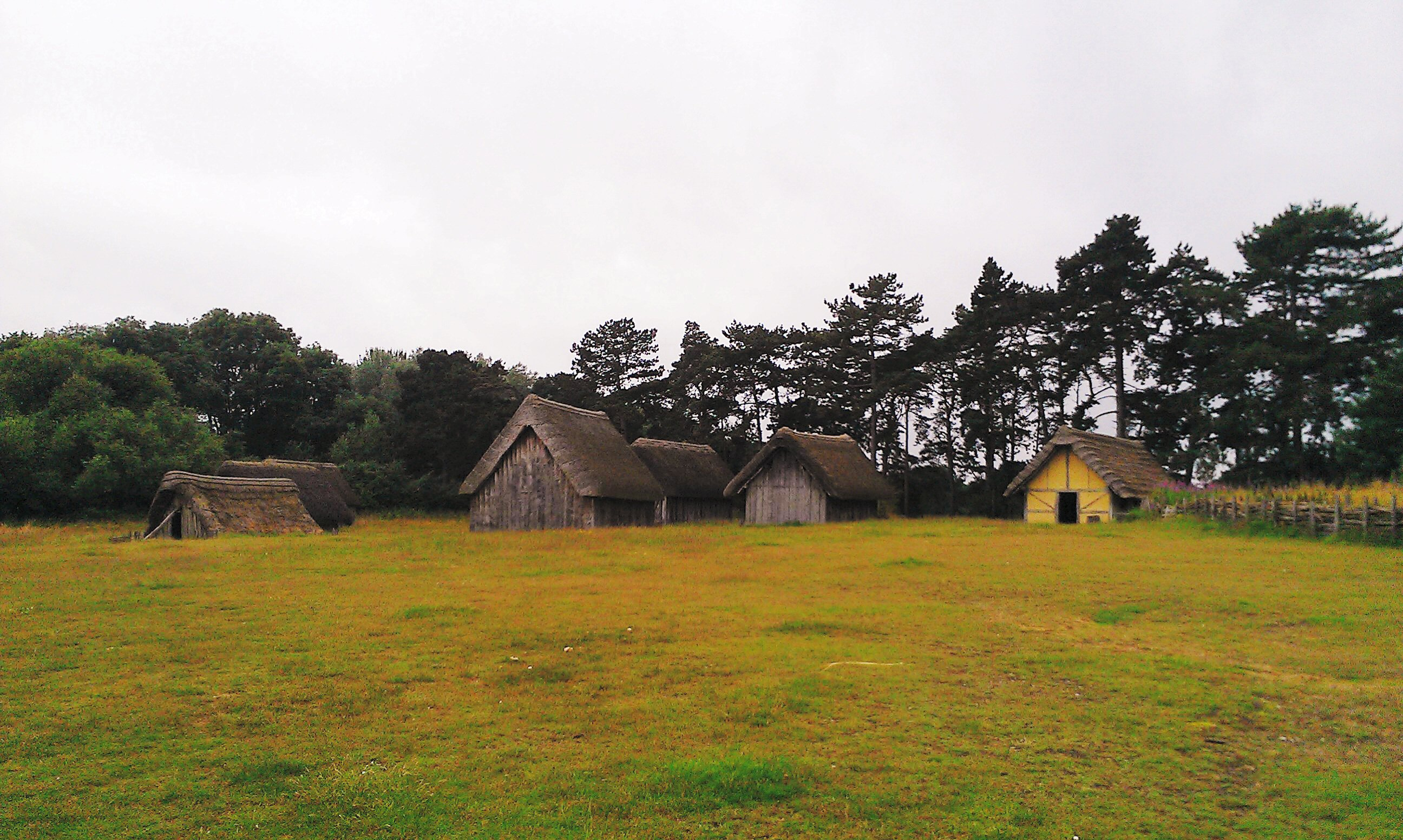
Panorama of the reconstructed village, on the sloping hill, with the 19th century pines in the background.

West Stow Anglo-Saxon Village is located on the north bank of the River Lark, adjacent to the village of West Stow in the western part of Suffolk. Situated on a small hill 15 feet (4.6 m) in height, it would have been noticeably prominent in the surrounding landscape; this hill formed a "core" for a sand dune that developed around from wind-carried sand during the early 14th century and which sharply drops on the leeward side while gradually sloping on the windward side. The steep southern slope is accentuated by a ditch at its base, which marks the edge of the river's flood plain.

The surrounding landscape as it appears today is radically different from the landscape that would have surrounded the area in the Iron Age and early medieval periods. The land to the north and east of the West Stow Anglo-Saxon village has been heavily modified during the construction of the Bury sewage farms, with the north-east corner of the site having been partly destroyed by a gravel pit in the 1950s. By the mid-1980s, the rubbish dumps that surrounded the site had been converted into a Country Park, with the landscape being regenerated with sedge, grass, birch and oak. The site of the settlement is also bisected by a row of pine trees that had been planted in the 19th century.

The solid geology of the Lark Valley is chalk, with patches of boulder clay that forms a high plateau capped with sands and gravels in West Stow and Icklingham. The site is seven miles west from the town of Bury St. Edmunds.

== Prehistoric settlement ==
The site at West Stow has shown evidence of human habitation throughout British prehistory. Indeed, the wider Lark Valley contains the greatest known concentration of prehistoric settlements in the region of East Anglia.

=== Mesolithic ===
Excavation at West Stow has discovered evidence for hunter-gatherers living in the area during the Mesolithic, or "Middle Stone Age" period. Temporarily camping on the knoll, they left behind them five or six dense concentrations of Sauveterrian-style waste lithic flakes, blades, cores and other stone implements. Similar scatters of Mesolithic worked flints have been found across the valley area.

=== Neolithic and Bronze Ages ===
Grooved ware and petit tranchet-style arrowheads dating from the Neolithic Age have been found in a field adjacent to the West Stow site.

== Anglo-Saxon settlement ==
During the early Anglo-Saxon period, West Stow was the site of a small village made up of timber buildings. Archaeological excavation of the site unearthed evidence for a variety of different constructions and areas at West Stow: 69 sunken-featured buildings (SFBs), alongside 7 post-hole buildings interpreted as halls, traces of several lesser structures, a reserve area for clay, 2 large hollows or animal pens, pits, various unassociated post holes and several 7th century boundary ditches. The Anglo-Saxon village showed no signs of the development of property boundaries until the last phase of occupation. There was no evidence that the settlement was defended by fortifications.

=== Sunken-featured buildings ===
The majority of structures built at West Stow belonged to a category of what the excavators called "sunken-featured buildings" (SFBs), a term first coined by Professor Philip Rahtz. In previous decades, buildings in this style had been known as "pit houses", "sunken houses" or "grubenhauser" (German: Grubenhäuser), but site director Stanley West noted that Rahtz's terminology had been adopted because it was "less contentious" and provided "a non-functional description." Seventy such sunken-featured buildings were recorded at the site.

=== Halls ===
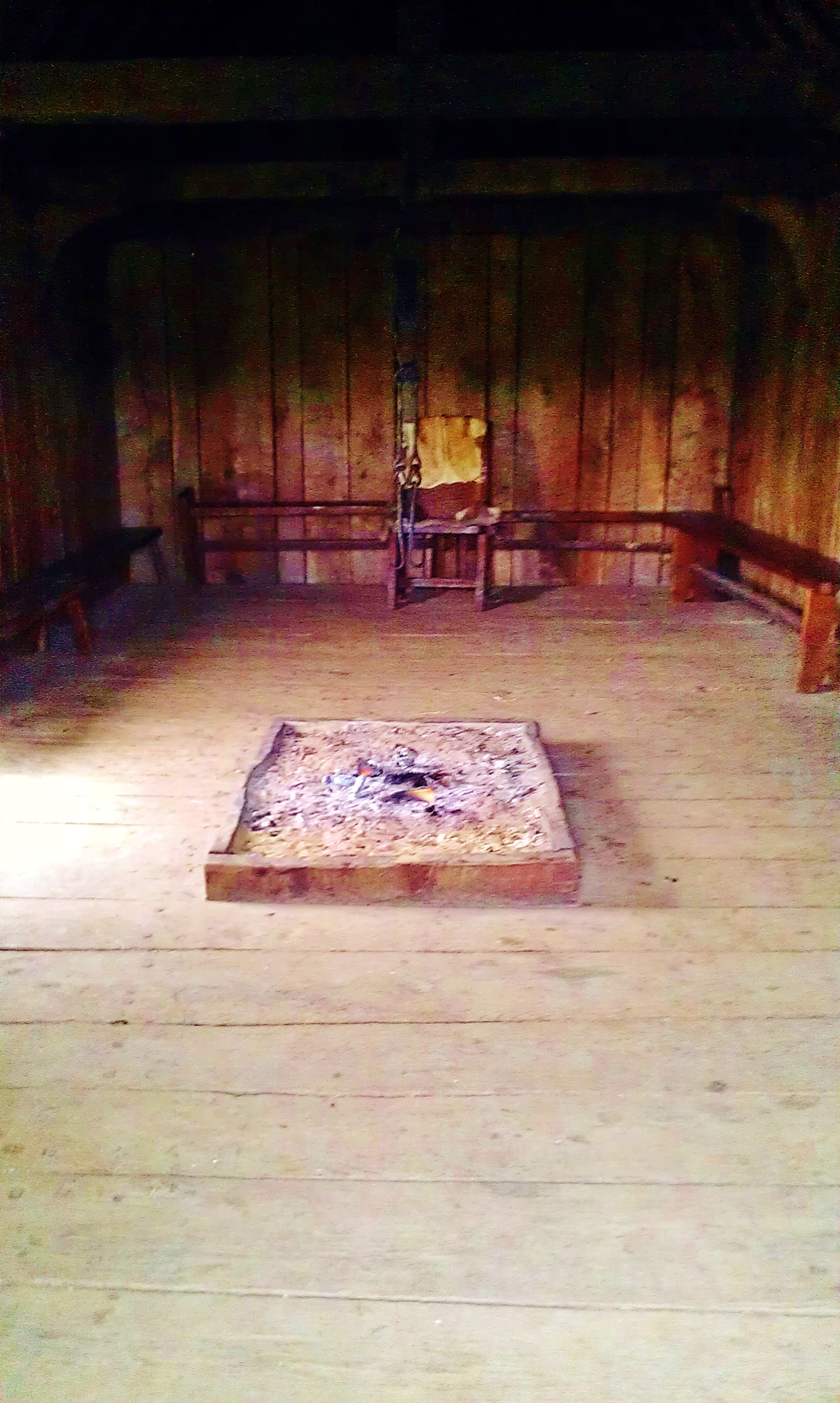
The interior of the reconstructed Hall, constructed in 2005.

The other category of building uncovered at West Stow consisted of seven larger structures held up by wooden posts which left behind postholes; the excavators interpreted these as halls. Five of these buildings were located along the central spine of the hill, with the other two being positioned on the north side and south side respectively. All of the buildings were roughly positioned east to west, although the hall on the north slope was instead orientated north-west to south-east.

Four of the halls are simple, rectangular areas which are defined by their single row of post holes. Another, Hall No. 2, was more complex than the others, having an internal division and double post-holes along the length. No. 7 was also different because it was built from a sleeper beam and larger post holes, while Hall No. 5 cannot be clearly defined because it lay in area that had seen multiple features rebuilt on top of it.

Hall 1 was located on the eastern end of the site, and survived as the most clearly defined of the post-built structures. 26 ft (7.9 m) in length and 13 ft 6 in (4.11 m) in breadth, there are gaps in the south and east side walls, suggesting the existence of two doorways. No hearth was found, although a patch of burnt sand, 2 ft (0.61 m) in diameter, was found in the centre of the hall. No objects were found within the building, although four were uncovered from the post-holes: a Roman bronze coin from the era of Emperor Valens, a flat iron strip, a flat palette and a fragment of a pottery spindle-whorl.

Hall 2, which was probably the largest of the structures, was located on the crest of the hill, surrounded by SFBs. 32 ft (9.8 m) in length and 14 ft (4.3 m) in width, there was a partition down the eastern side of the building, creating a chamber 8 ft (2.4 m) wide. East of the hall's centre was a patch of burnt sand, marking the position of a hearth. The position of the doorway is not entirely clear, although excavators believed that it was most likely on the south side, close to the partitioning wall. Items discovered in Hall 2 included a Roman bronze coin from the era of the Emperor Victorinus, bronze and iron strips, a bone pin, fragments of both glass and a loomweight, as well as a variety of iron objects, including a knife, nail, plate and key.

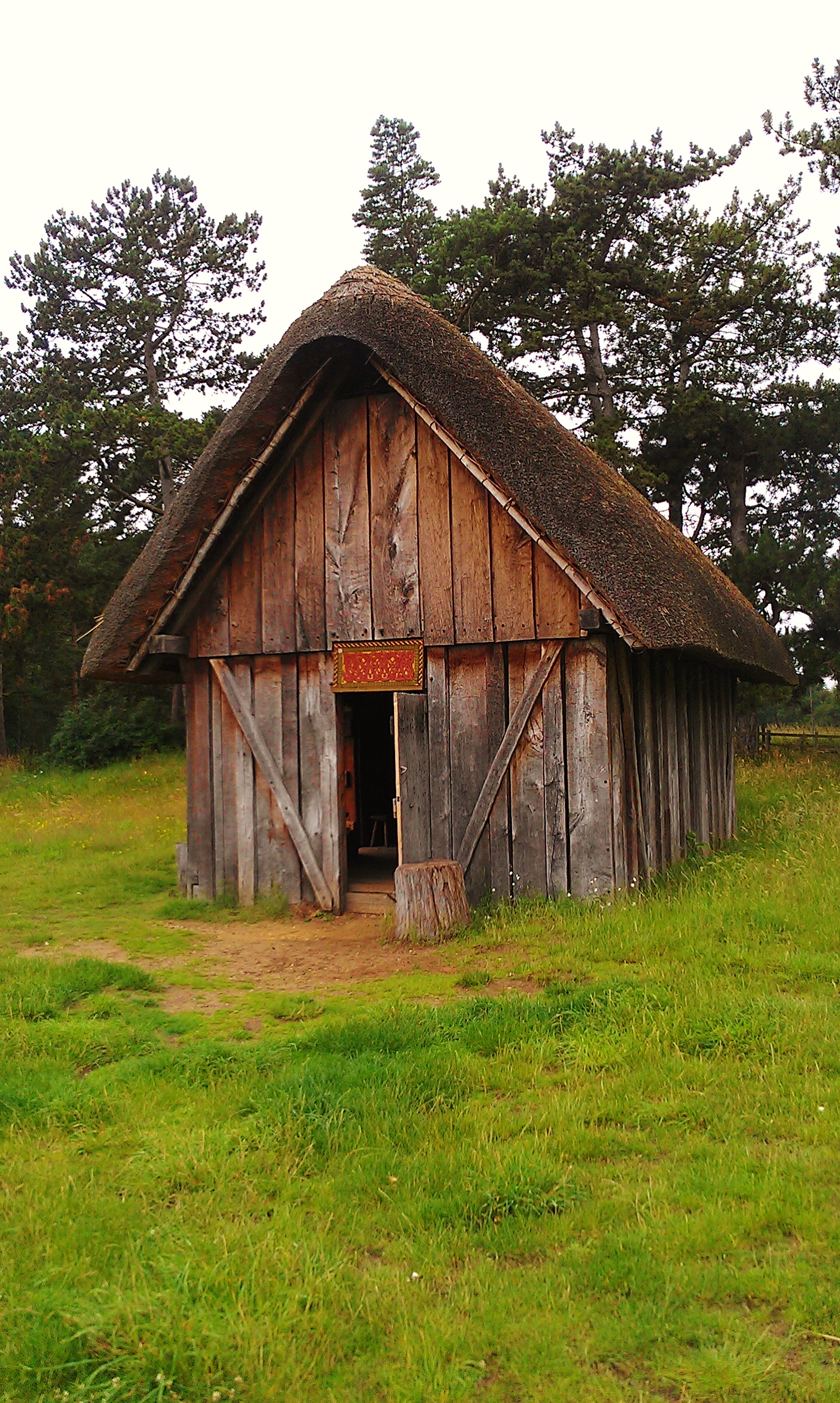
The reconstruction of the Hall, constructed in 2005.

The incomplete Hall 3, on the same axis as Halls 1 and 2, was akin in shape and size to the former, but much of its south side had been obliterated by the subsequent construction of other buildings on that site. Fifteen items were found in the interior of the Hall, including three bronze Roman objects; a coin from the era of Emperor Constantine I, a ligula and a dolphin brooch, as well as fragments of glass, a spindlewhorl, and a series of iron objects. Also on this axis was Hall 4, which was also heavily obscured by later building, but it appeared to cover an area at least 22 ft (6.7 m) long and 16 ft (4.9 m) wide. Only three finds were discovered from within it; a Roman bronze coin from the era of Emperor Crispus, a Roman glass fragment and a triangular bone comb.

Hall 5 was located on the south-eastern corner of the settlement, on the lowest slope of the hill. Like with several other of the halls, its plan has been obscured by subsequent buildings constructed on the site, although a large number of postholes and three hearths were uncovered; this has led excavators to believe that there had been two halls on that site, one known as 5A and the other as 5B. Finds from the buildings included a number of items made out of bronze, iron and bone.

Hall 6 was at the far western end of the hill, along as the same east-to-west axis as Halls 1, 2, 3 and 4. At least 25 ft (7.6 m) long and 12 ft (3.7 m) wide, the structure was apparently relatively weak in design, and within it was discovered a Roman bronze spoon, and two iron objects, one of which was possibly a small chisel. Hall 7 contained a dark layer of material at the occupation layer, with finds including a variety of stones, bones and sherds, along with much burnt daub, unburnt clay mixed with chalk and a broken Anglo-Saxon pot. It has been interpreted as being 37 ft 6in in length and 25 ft 9in in diameter, making it the largest of the halls at West Stow. It was subject to various possible interpretations, although represented the most sophisticated building at West Stow, involving a more advanced technique than that shown for many of the other constructions. Artefacts found at the site included a number of Roman bronze coins, and a variety of bronze, iron, glass and bone artefacts.

=== Other features ===
A number of post-built structures were uncovered at the West Stow Anglo-Saxon settlement which were too small to be interpreted as Halls. These postholes tended to be clustered together, suggesting the possibility that they may have been used to repair small structures. No evidence of fencing was found on any of these structures, which were labelled Buildings 8 through to 14 by the excavators.

At the site, four large areas of grey, disturbed soil were uncovered, three of which were in the eastern side of the settlement. Stratigraphically dated to the Anglo-Saxon period, they all contained a number of small potsherds, with Hollows 1 and 4 also containing a number of bronze and iron objects. The purpose of these Hollows is unknown, although chief excavator Stanley West speculated that they may have represented animal pens which were once surrounded by a form of hurdling or light fencing, traces of which have not survived.

79 pits at the site were also dated to the Anglo-Saxon period, with a further 20 possibles also being identified. This latter group included 12 pits forming a separate group, each of which was rectangular in shape, vertically sided, flat bottomed, and containing a buff sand filling. Their purposes remain unknown.

In the final phase of settlement at the site, it is evident that several ditches were dug, often containing fragments of Ipswich ware and other artefacts. Those ditches dug on the village's western sector appeared to have been used to define certain areas of the settlement, while those on the eastern side serve no apparent functional purpose.

=== Artefacts ===
Roman Objects

These objects were found in Anglo Saxon context but relate to Romano-British occupation

Bracelets and Finger Rings

Bracelets and Rings are not common in Anglo-Saxon graves, many of those found at West Stow are of Romano-British origin including ones made of twisted wire, jet, flat decorated bands, and narrow bands with serrated edges. Of the rings, four were clearly of Roman origin, one made of bronze and three of glass.

Brooches

Three brooches and one brooches spring of Roman origin were found consistent with the late iron age settlement, or early activity phases. Eleven others were recovered from Roman features.

Spoons

Nine fragmentary, bronze spoons were found. Five are of the 'rat-tailed' type, three of which have faceted ornament.

Pins

Pins with small, knobbed heads were found, suspected to be left over from earlier Roman occupation. A pin with a triangular, grooved head was found, also likely Roman.

Toilet articles

Three bronze scoops and one 'unguent' spoon were found, all in different layers/contexts.

Misc.

A bronze balance beam, a miniature axe- paralleled by similar finds on the continent- and a 5th century iron stylus.

Anglo-Saxon objects

Brooches

Six brooches are found in the settlement material. One iron upturned-foot brooch, one cruciform, a knob from a cruciform, and three small, long brooches.

Bracelets and Finger Rings

A bronze, wire bracelet with a slip knot was found in grave 1 with no other grave goods. Spiral rings dating from late 5th to late 6th century. Two silver rings, a slip knot and a simple overlapping band, both dating to late 5th century. Various fragments, and a small lead ring with a wound knot.

Dress Articles

Three wrist clasps, two of bronze, one of iron. Five belt ends, one early 5th century. Dress pins of silver, bronze, iron, and bone, mostly dating to the late phase of the settlement. Eight pairs of tweezers from the settlement, seven more from the cemetery. A fragment of rolled bronze which may be the furrule of a small cosmetic brush. A 'D' shaped strap-separator threaded with two iron loops, potentially for a small knife. Other small iron suspension loops have been found. A decorated fragment of silver-gilt, which may be part of a belt slide. A 'shield pendant' of silver, dated to the late 6th or early 7th century. A bronze fastener.

Iron implements

Sixty-six knives were found, many broken or very worn. All were small, the longest had 11cm blade, and narrow. Many had traces of a wooden handle but only one was riveted. Four iron arrowheads. One small iron spear, suggested to be 5th century. Three small iron reaping hooks, one pair of sheers. No large tool survive, presumable the metal were melted down and reworked. One iron awl, which may be related to miscellaneous 'spikes' found onsite, which otherwise may be related to wool combs. Distribution of iron nails which suggest internal fittings or furniture. Some kind of turning device, potentially a pole-lathe. An iron tripod bowl.

Bone working and Bone Objects

Fragments of bone and antler with saw marks are common and suggest craftsmanship. This includes dress pins, bone combs, and spindle-whorls.

Pin-Beaters

Ten, complete, double-ended points, commonly known as pin-beaters, used in weaving and highly polished from use. All are rounded in section, some points are flattened, they range in length from 8.7cm to 14.5cm.

Needles

Thirty-seven triangular-headed bone needles, usually made of fibula of pig, and two more ornate ones.

Pierced Bones

The function of the pierced bones is unknown. All are from sheep: five are metacarpals, three pierced centrally, two at distal end; six are metatarsals, five pierced distally and only one central; one is an incomplete tibia, pierced at the distal end. Holes are irregular and likely made with a pointed knife. They range from early 5th century to late sixth century.

Pottery Stamps

Five stamps, made from antler tines, indicate pottery making on site, supported by the 'clay reserve'. Three are short stubs with the stamp carved into the sawn off end, one is longer, and the last is from the main beam of a roe deer antler, with the stamp carved into the stub.

Other

Bone Keys

Boars' tusk amulet

Combs

A well preserved group of 106 combs or comb fragments made from bone or antler, and one comb case, made from bone, were recovered. Of these, fifty-five were double sided and fifty-one single sided.

Querns

Thirteen contexts contained fragments of niedermendig lava querns and four contexts had fragments of pudding stone querns. no complex lava querns were found.

== Modern history ==
=== Excavation: 1849–1976 ===
The first excavations to take place in the vicinity of the West Stow village were undertaken in 1849, when an Anglo-Saxon cemetery was accidentally discovered on the nearby heath, and "skeletons and numerous urns" were found. Finds discovered at the cemetery would be collected by a number of locals until 1852. These included John Gwilt of Icklingham, Reverend S. Banks of Dullingham and the Reverend E.R. Benyon of Culford, who at the time was the proprietor of the heath. None of them ever seem to have publicly suggested that there may have been an Anglo-Saxon settlement nearby. In 1879, and then again in the 1890s, a local amateur archaeologist named Henry Prigg of Icklingham identified and excavated several Romano-British pottery kilns on the heat, although no accurate records from this excavation have survived. In 1940, the archaeologist Basil Brown (1888–1977), best known for having excavated the Anglo-Saxon ship burial at Sutton Hoo in the 1930s, discovered two further Romano-British pottery kilns at the site. He proceeded to excavate them in 1947, and they were sampled for archaeo-magnetic purposes by Dr John Belshé of the Department of Geodosy and Geophysics at the University of Cambridge.

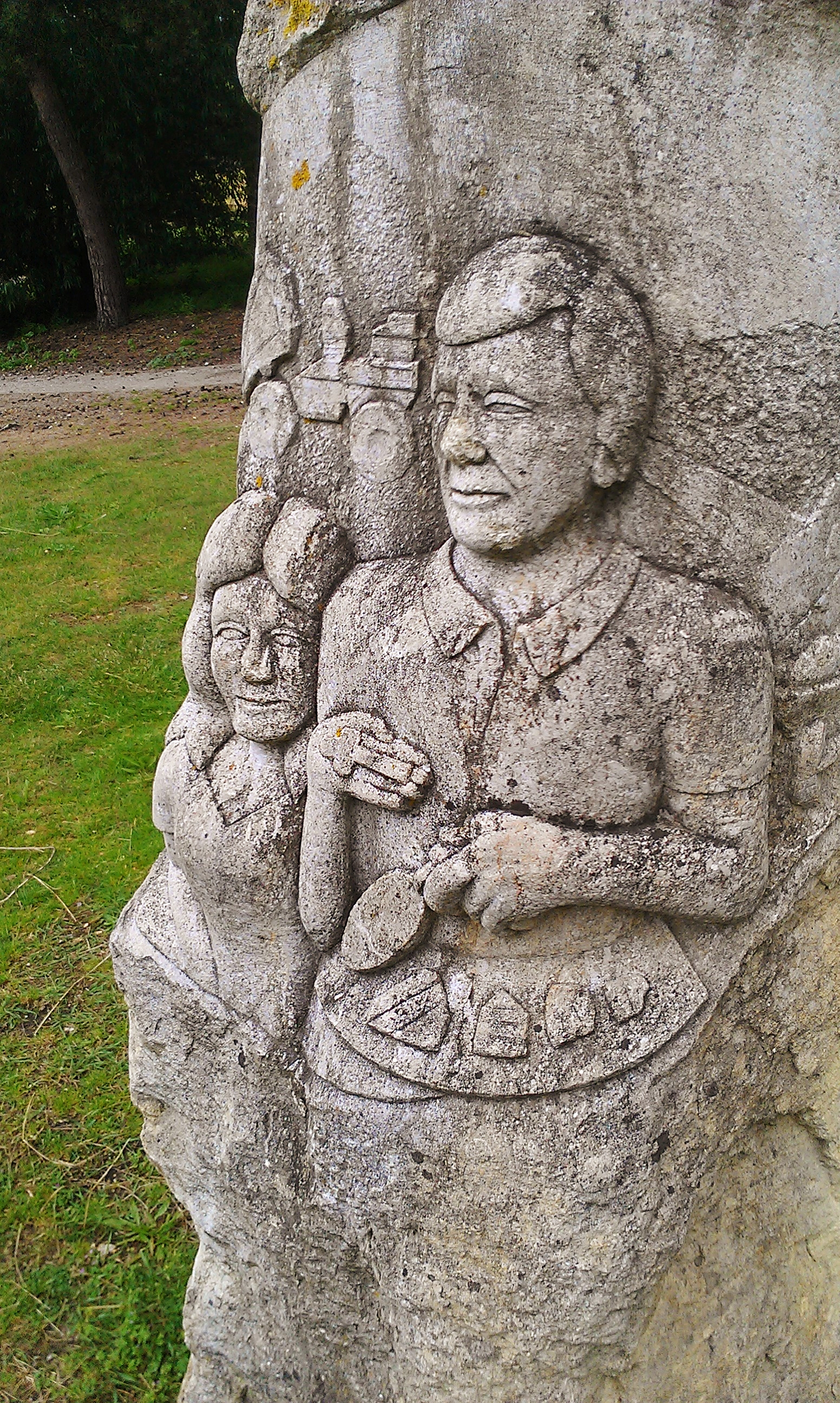
Stone relief depiction of Stanley West holding an archaeological trowel at West Stow.

The man responsible for initiating the archaeological investigation of the Anglo-Saxon village was Stanley West, who had first become interested in Anglo-Saxon England when working as an assistant at the Ipswich Museum. In 1947, he joined the West Stow excavation being run by Brown that unearthed two Romano-British pottery kilns. During this investigation, it became clear to the excavators that there had also been a later Anglo-Saxon settlement on the site, evidenced by the finding of early Anglo-Saxon potsherds in rabbit-burrow scrapes over the area and then the discovery of the section of a hut in the site's north-eastern corner. Proceeding to publish his findings on the kilns in 1952, West went on to excavate Anglo-Saxon areas of Ipswich for the MOPBW alongside studying archaeology in an academic capacity at the University of Cambridge. In April 1958, he attended a conference on early Anglo-Saxon pottery in Norwich that was organised by the Council for British Archaeology. Here, he met Professor Vera Evison of Birkbeck College, London, and posed the question to her as to why archaeologists had so far focused on the excavation of Anglo-Saxon cemeteries rather than settlements; she replied that the latter were far harder to detect than the former. In response, West informed her about the Anglo-Saxon potsherds that had emerged at West Stow, and intrigued, she soon began excavating at the site for the Ministry of Public Building and Works (MOPBW).

Meanwhile, inspired by Mary Leakey's discoveries in Olduvai Gorge, West traveled to Eastern Africa to excavate at the Tanganyikan city of Dar Es Salaam, only returning to England five years later, in 1965. Here, Evison and John Hurst, Inspector of the MOPBW asked him to take charge of the West Stow excavation, which he agreed to. Over the next 7 years he opened up an area of approximately ¾ of an acre each season. Funded by the MOPBW, West hoped to excavate as much of the site as possible, but ultimately, the excavation remained restrained to the settlement site, not exploring the surrounding field systems, an idea proposed by Dr. Van Es, Head of the Dutch Archaeological Service. The excavation was undertaken by a team of site supervisors and six builders' labourers, aided by roughly 30 volunteers drawn from both universities and the local area.

The top stratigraphic layer on the site, a sediment of blown sand known as Layer 1, was removed by backhoe, exposing the old ground surface (Layer 2) beneath it. Evidence of late medieval ridge-and-furrow ploughing was found in this layer, and dated through the discovery of 13th century pottery. Layer 2 consisted largely of a very dark soil that was removed primarily by backhoe. Below this was revealed the layers in which the Anglo-Saxon village had been constructed. Towards the end of the final season, the excavators at West Stow made use of the pioneering system of retrieving seeds and plant remains by flotation, which had just been developed by archaeologists at the University of Cambridge.

=== Reconstruction: 1977–present ===
"Over the first 27 years the West Stow Anglo-Saxon Village project has moved through a series of experimental reconstructions with a controlled development of woodworking and structural detail within the range of technologies available to the Anglo-Saxons. This practical experience has provided fresh insights into the everyday life of an Anglo-Saxon community and has, I believe, put some flesh on the dry bones of archaeology by encouraging the visitor to see the people and appreciate their struggle to survive and indeed, prosper."

— Stanley West, 2001.

The St Edmundsbury District Council planned to turn the area into a rubbish dump servicing the city of Bury St. Edmunds following the culmination of excavation, a decision that was reviewed annually. Eventually they decided against this decision, forming the West Stow Saxon Village Trust, an experimental archaeological group, in order to reconstruct some of the Anglo-Saxon buildings in the hope of learning more about Anglo-Saxon building techniques and architecture. The work was undertaken by a group of undergraduate students from Cambridge University who called themselves the West Stow Environmental Archaeology Group. These experimental reconstructions ensured that they only made use of woodworking techniques and technologies that would have been available in Anglo-Saxon England.

One of the halls excavated at West Stow also provided the basis for a reconstruction erected at the Bishops Wood Environmental Centre near Stourport-on-Severn in Worcestershire; known as "Saxon Hall", it took four years to build, and was used to teach local schoolchildren about life in the Early Medieval. It burned down in 2008 when an ember from a cooking fire set the building alight; John Rhymer, Head of Bishops Wood Centre, told press that he and his team were "devastated". However, the Hall was rebuilt over the following two years at a cost of £34,000. At its official reopening on 21 January 2011, the Anglo-Saxonist Stephen Pollington gave a speech in Old English while a historical reenactor, Paul Mortimer, appeared in character as Raedwald, King of East Anglia. Other attendees included Terry Herbert, who had discovered the Staffordshire Hoard in 2009, members of the Kidderminster Art Society and children on a school trip from Northleigh Manor School in Oxfordshire.

The fan-made short film Born of Hope (2009), based on appendices to J.R.R. Tolkien's The Lord of the Rings book trilogy and inspired by The Lord of the Rings films, was largely filmed in West Stow Anglo-Saxon Village.

The 1999 ITV Sitcom Dark Ages was also filmed at the village.

== Images ==
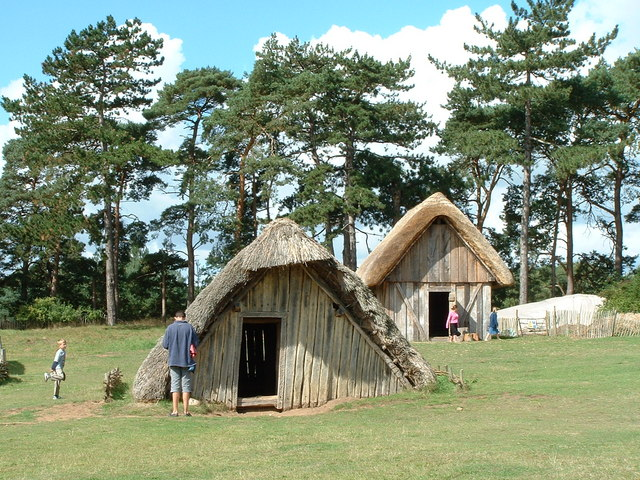
The village.

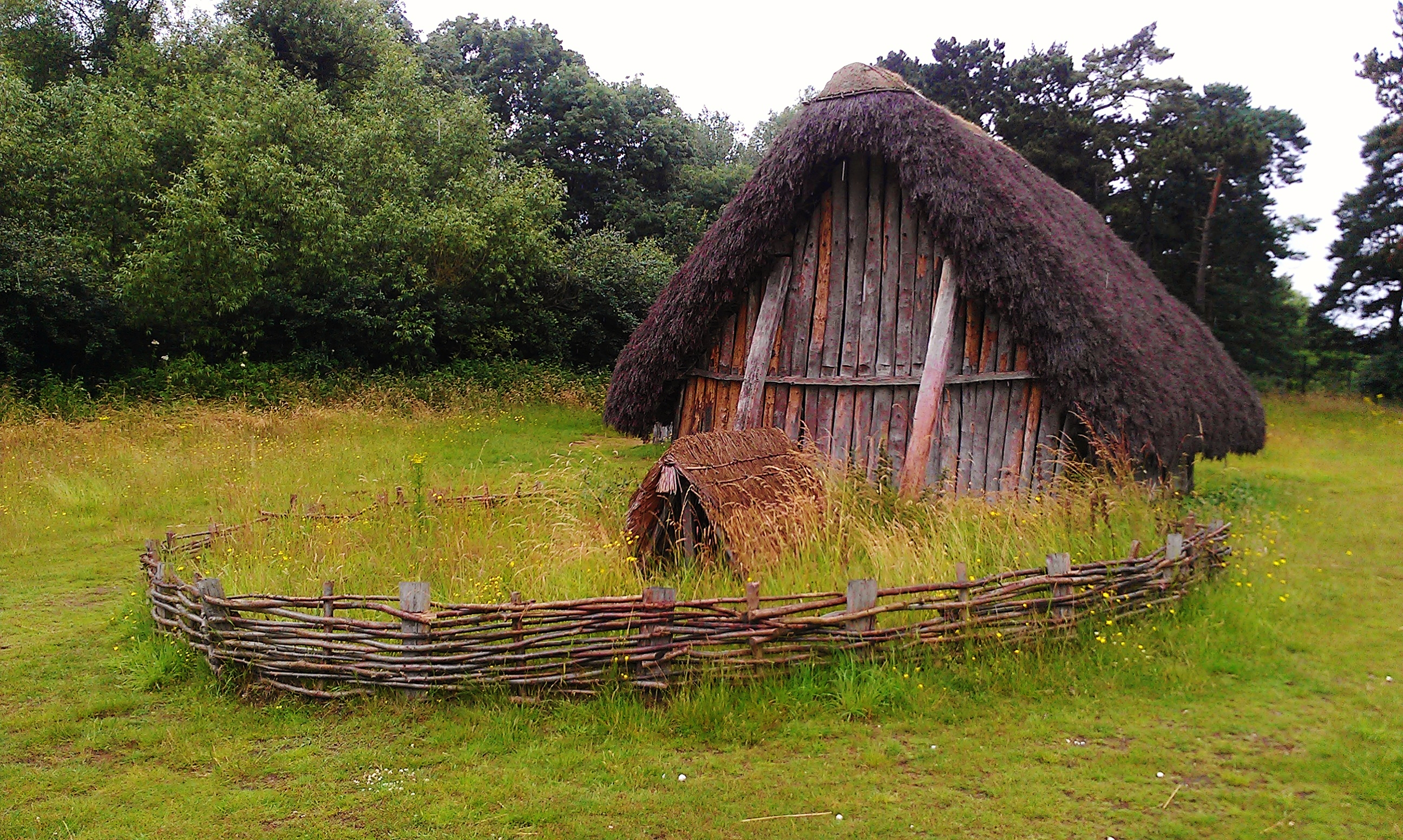
The Oldest House, constructed in 1974.

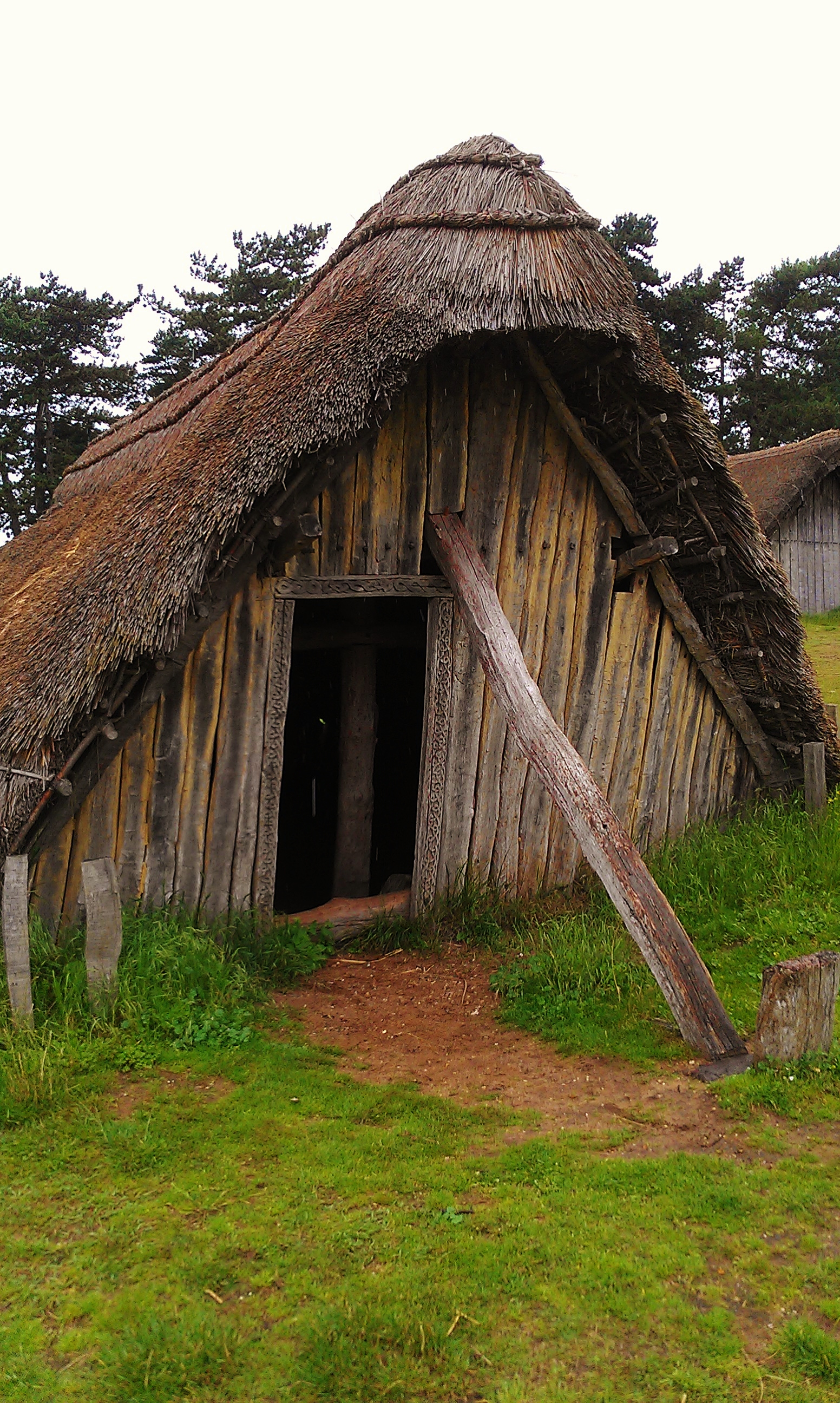
The Sunken House, constructed in 1976.

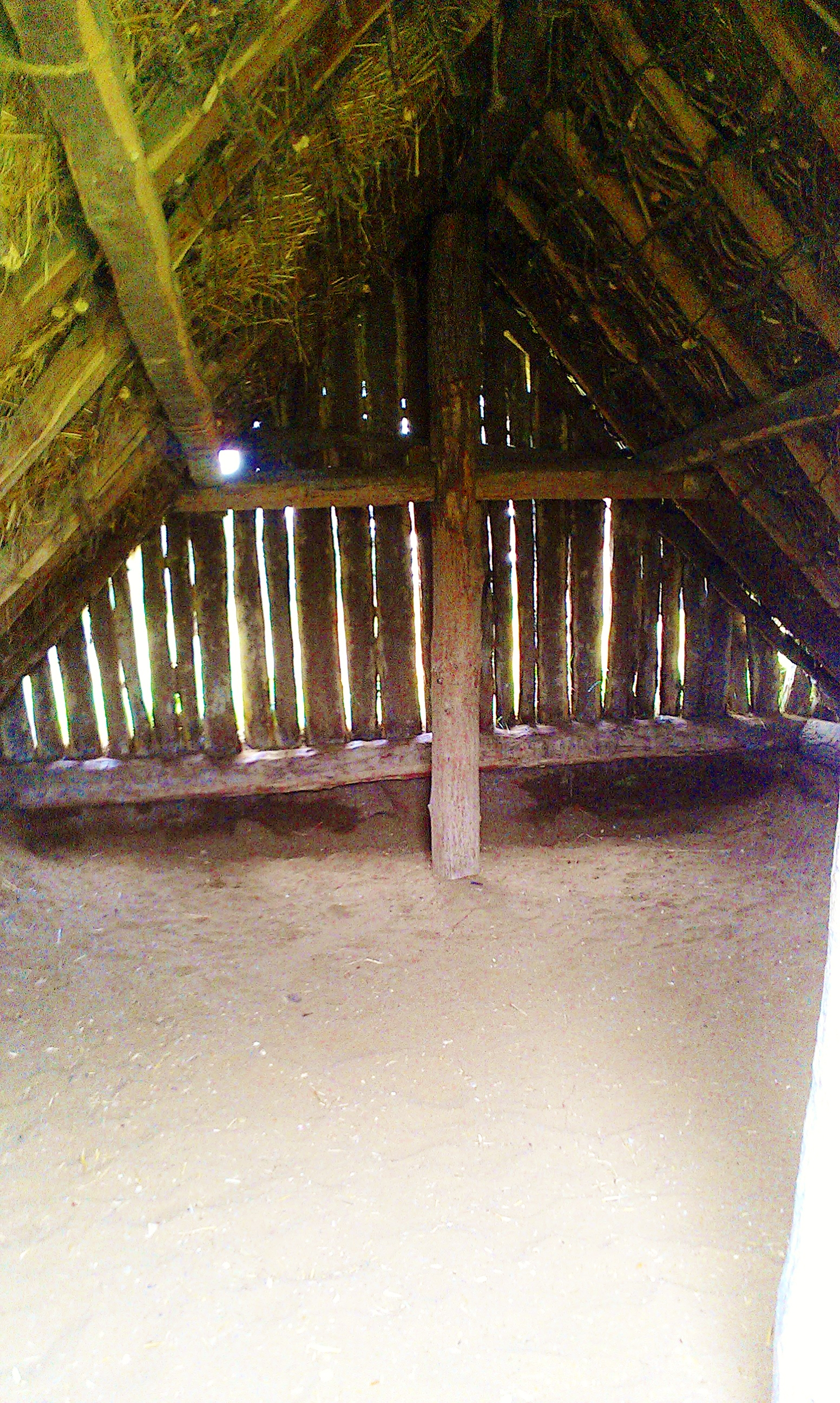
The interior of the Sunken House, constructed in 1976.

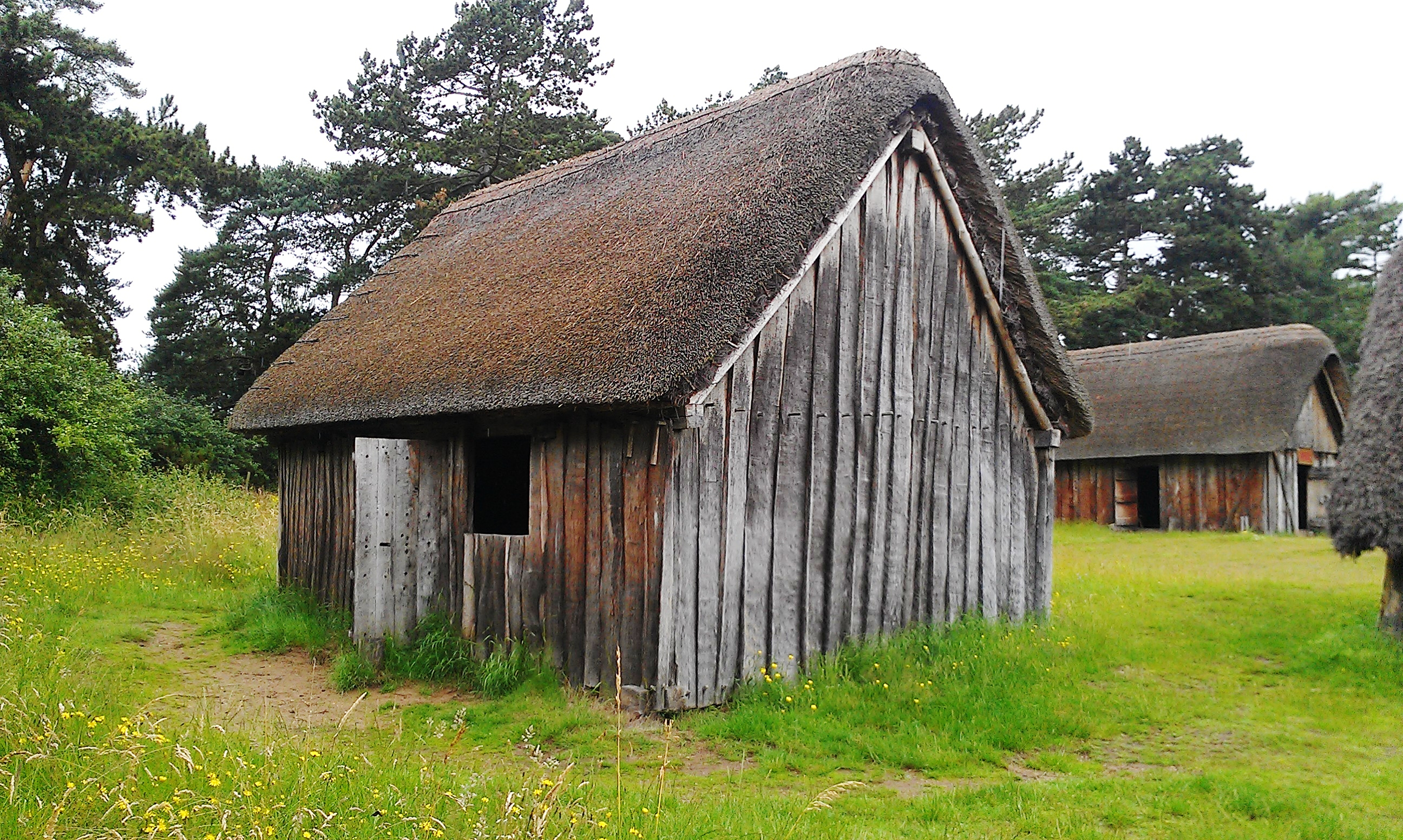
The Weaving House, constructed in 1984.

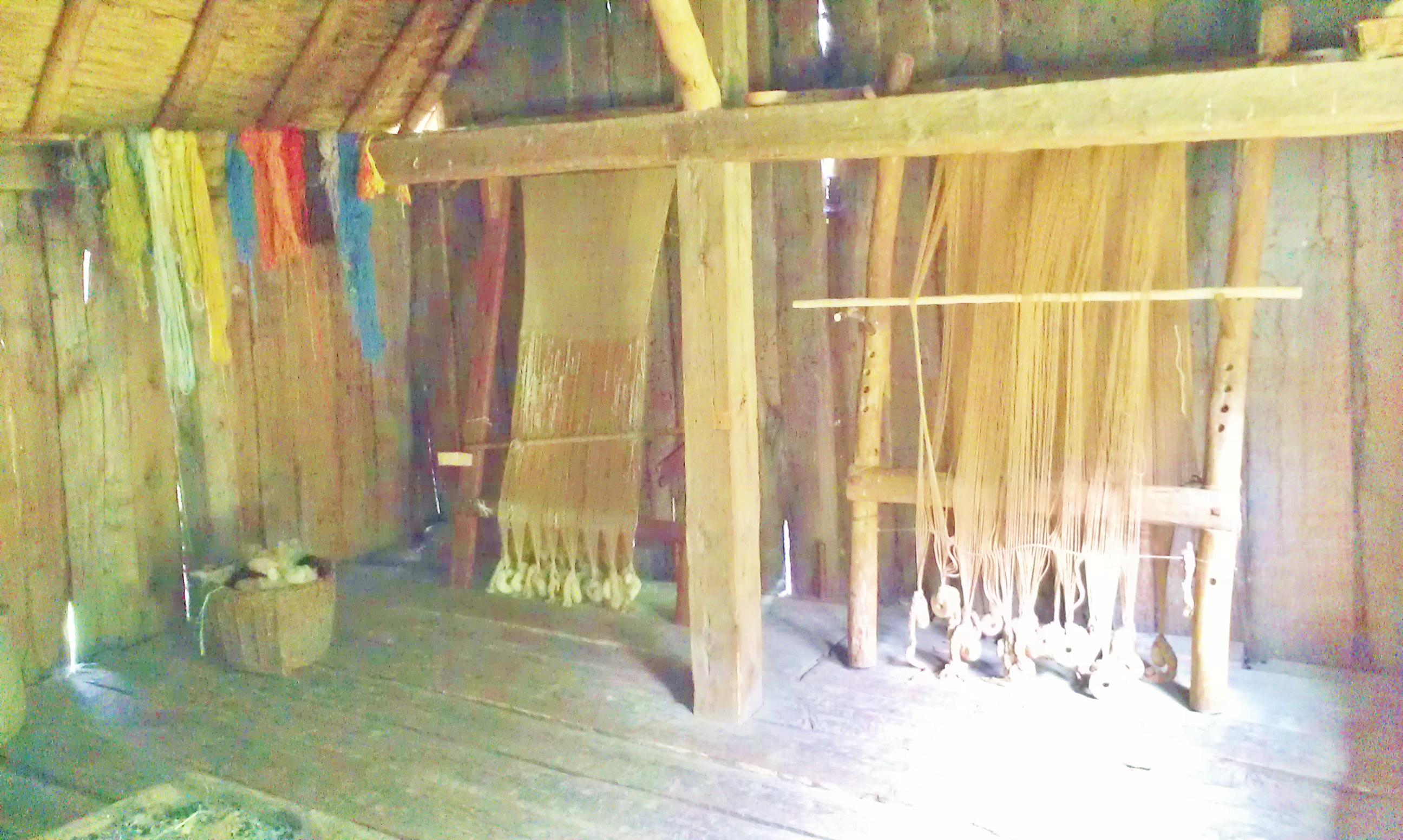
The interior of the Weaving House, constructed in 1984.

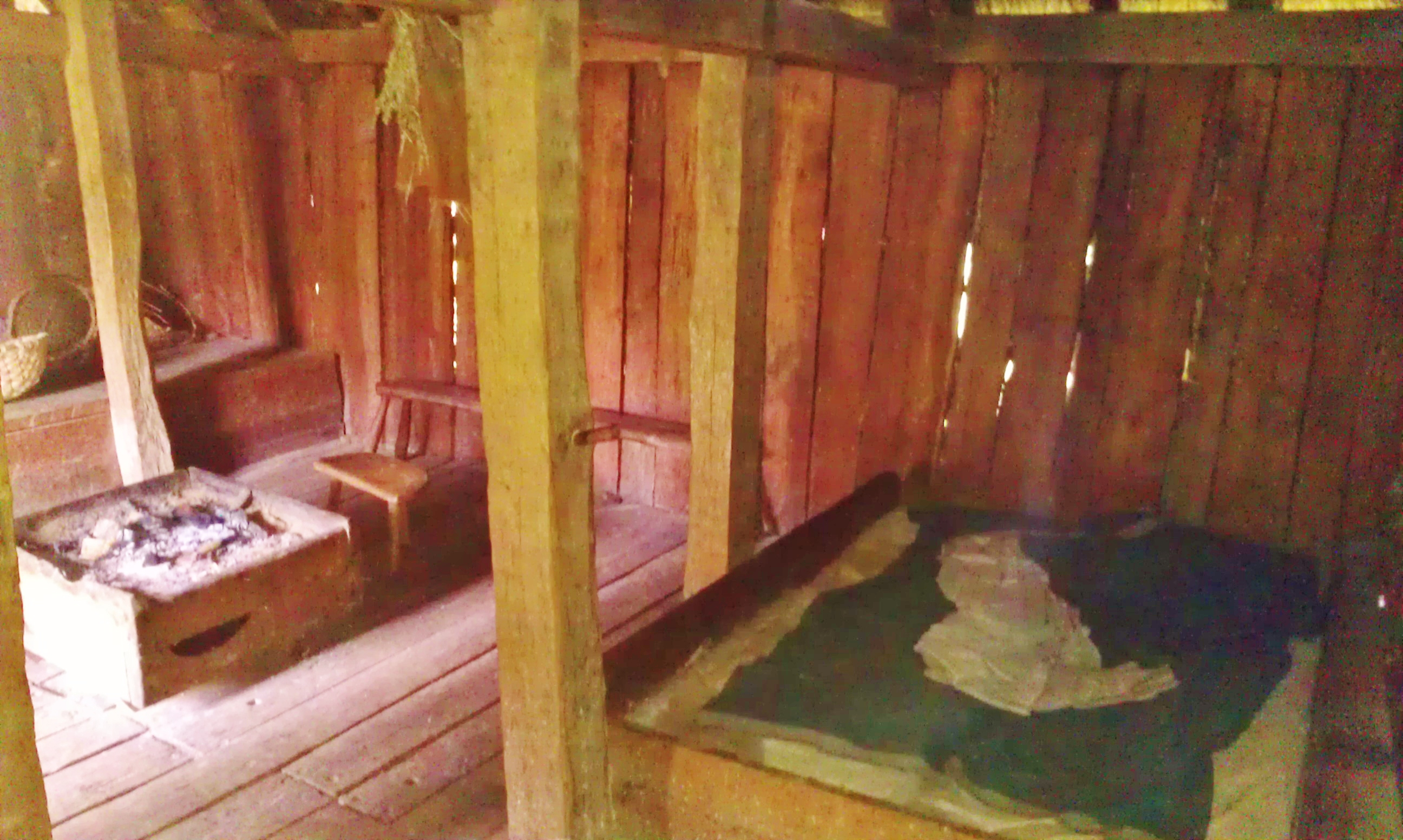
The interior of the Living House, constructed in 1987.

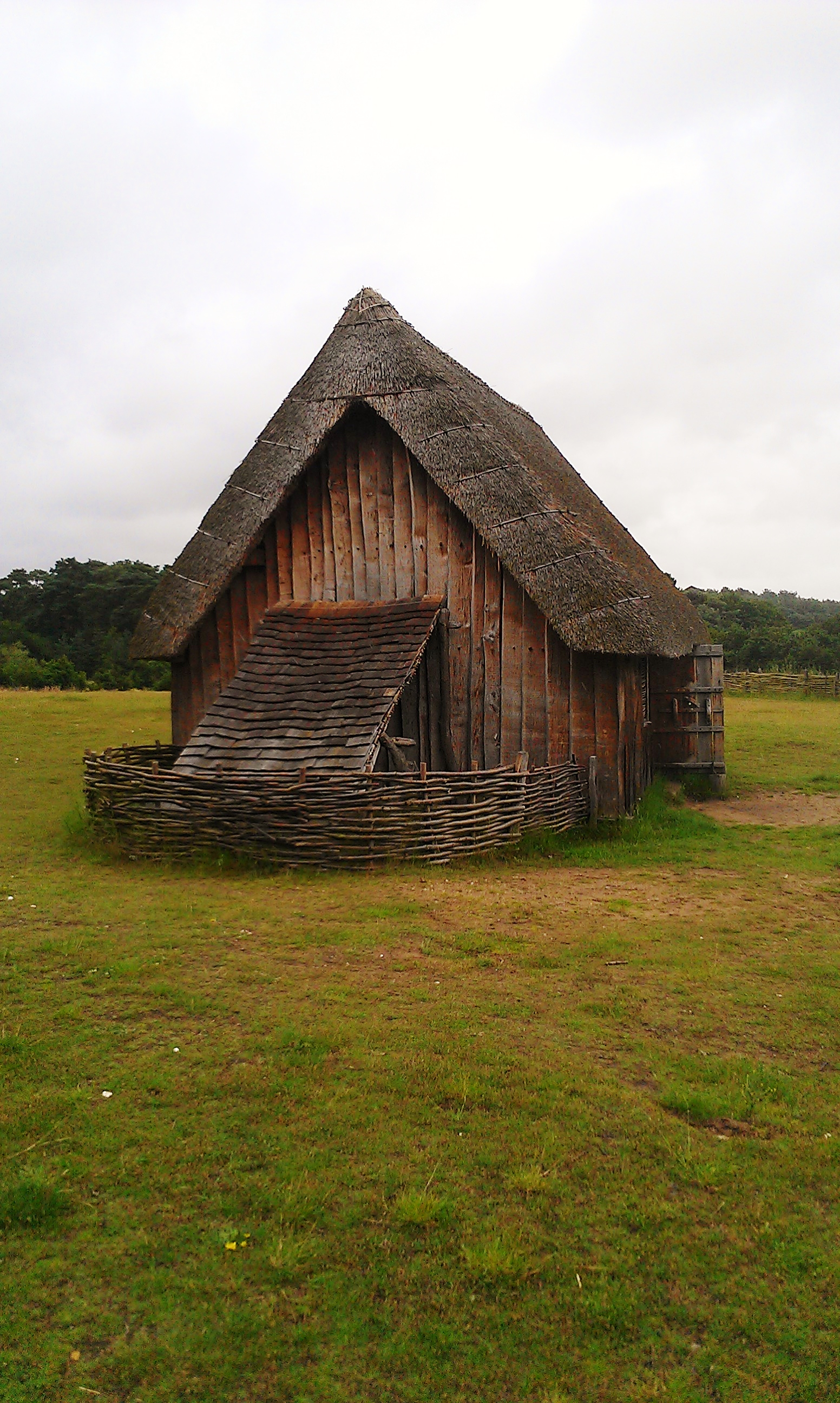
The Farmer's House, constructed in 2007. Attached to the building is an experimental wooden-slate roof.

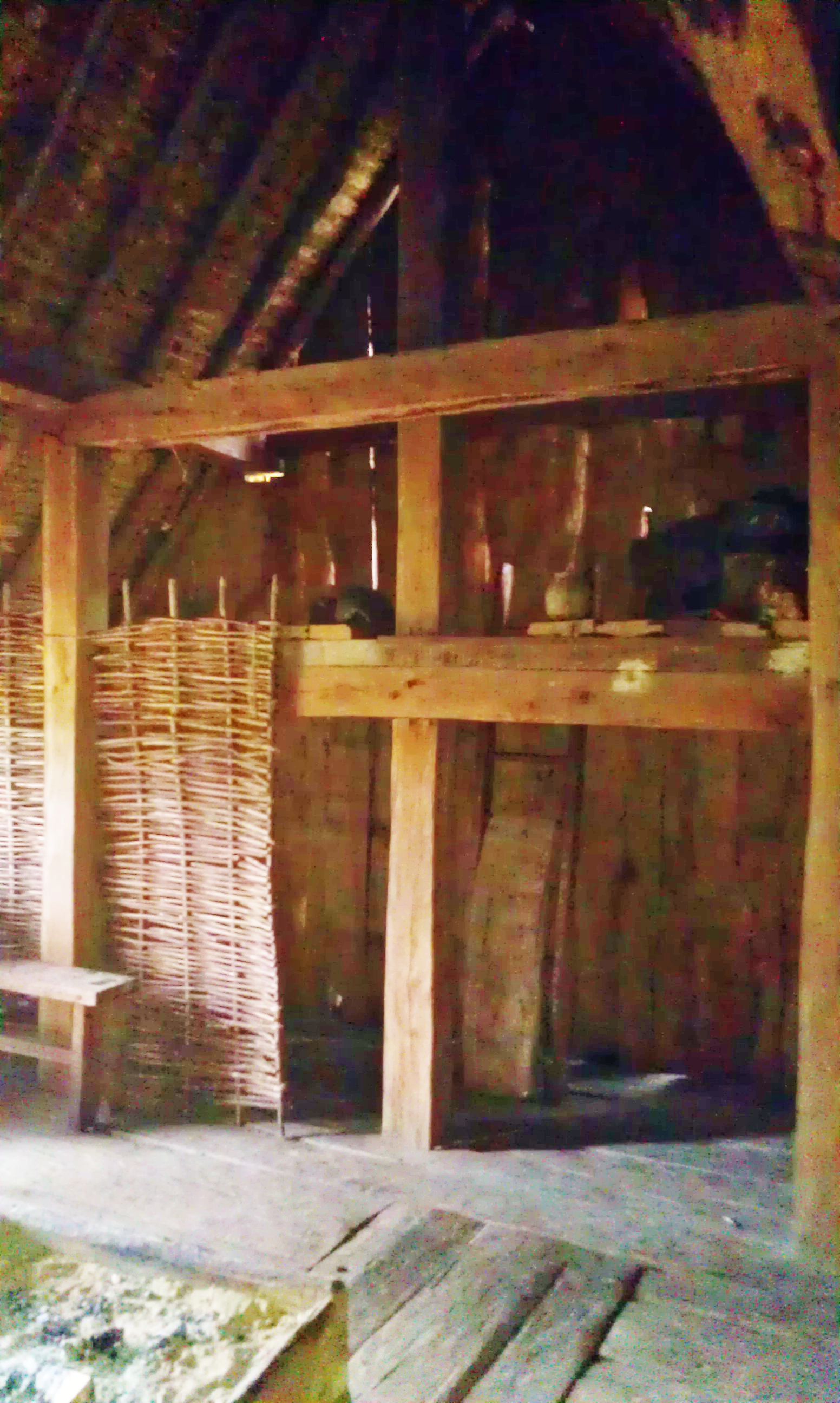
The interior of the Farmer's House, constructed in 2007.

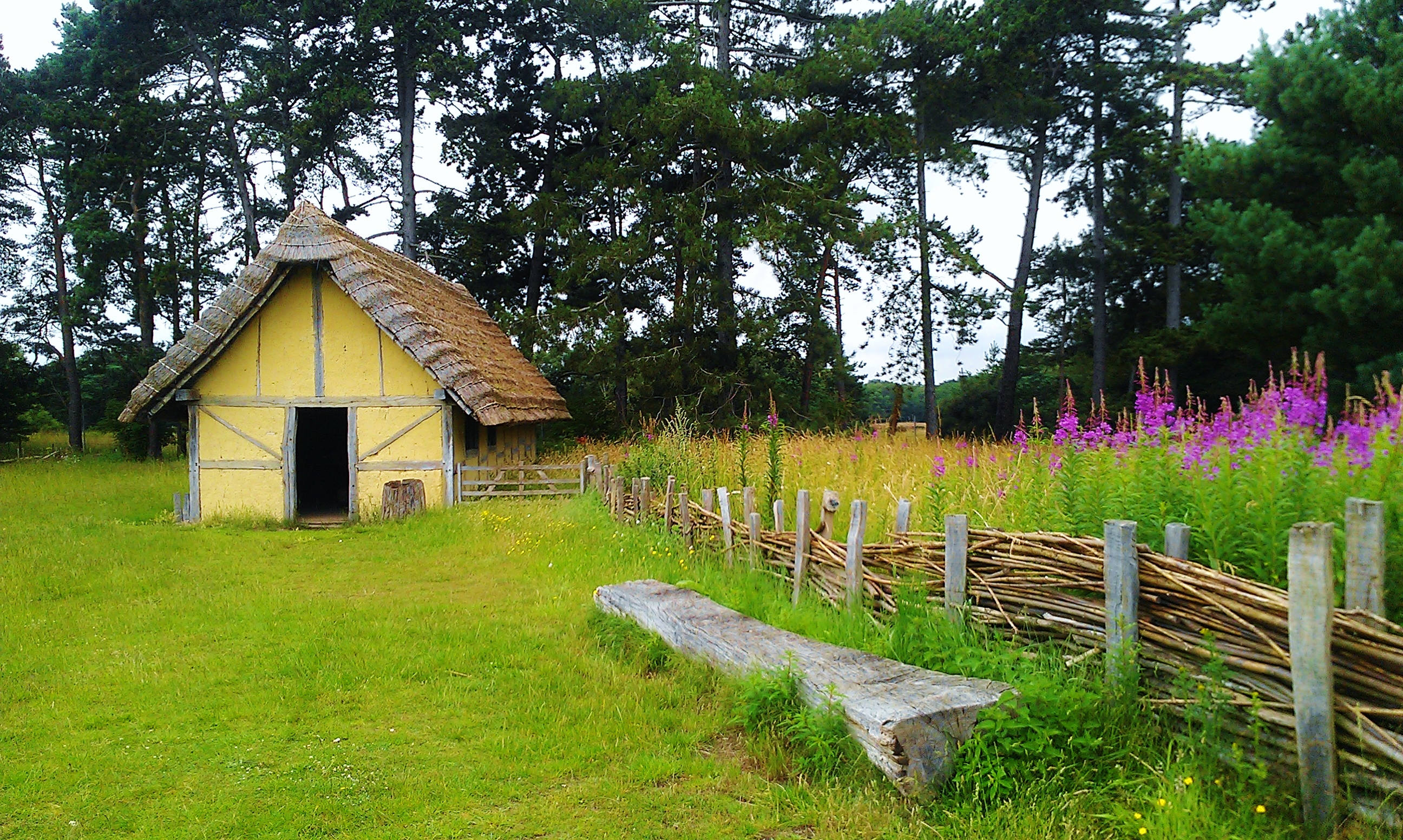
The Workshop, constructed in 1991.

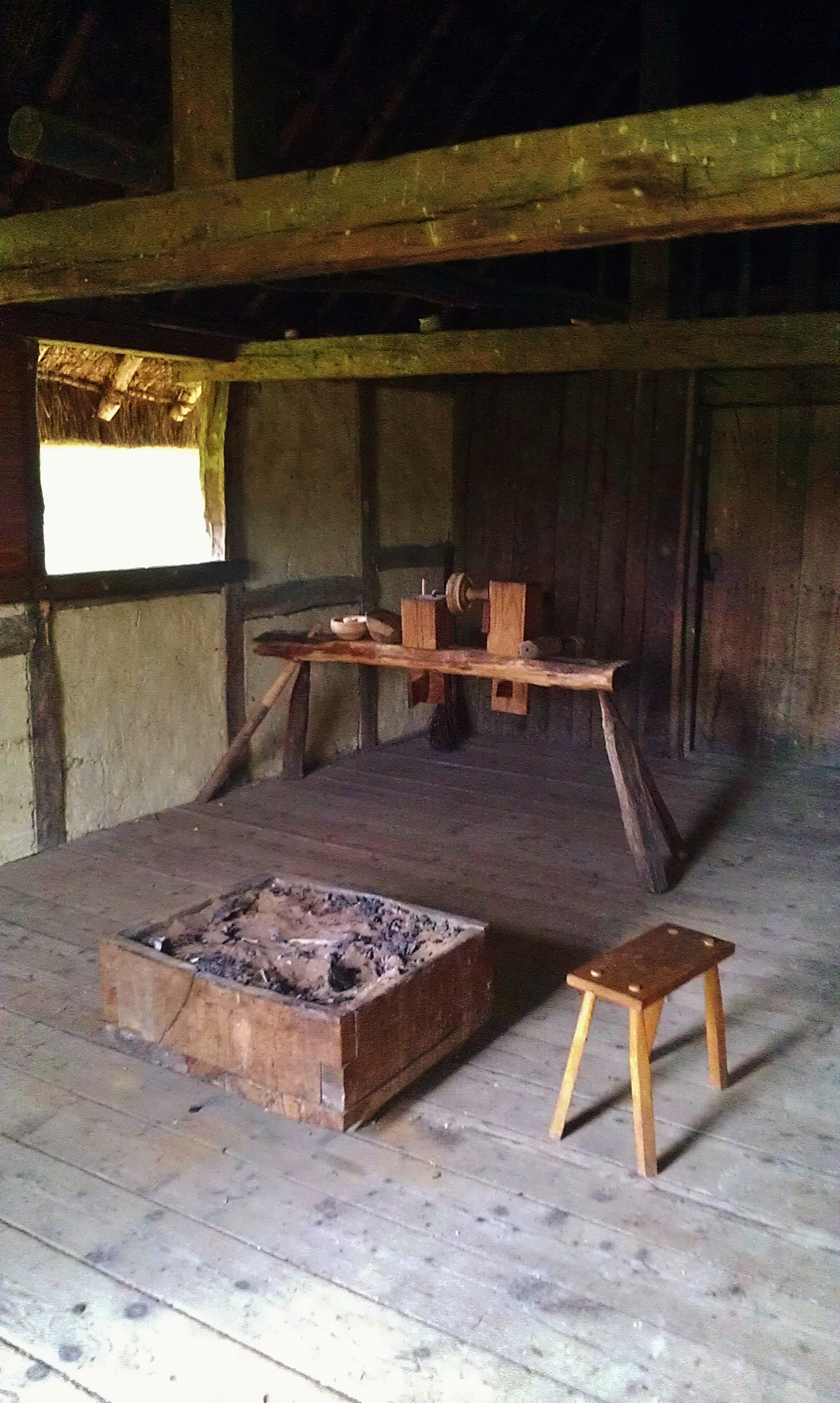
The interior of the Workshop, constructed in 1991.

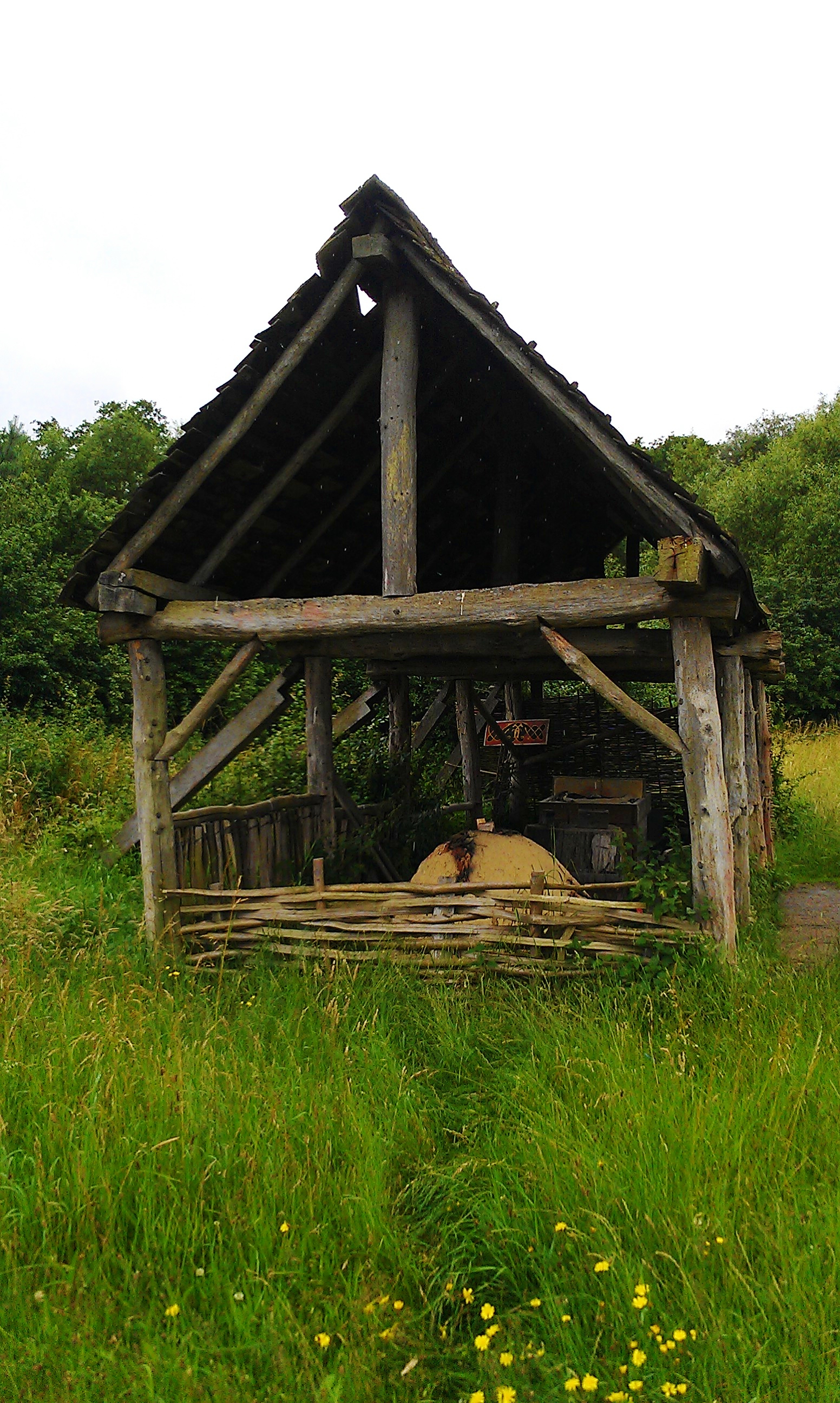
The craft building.

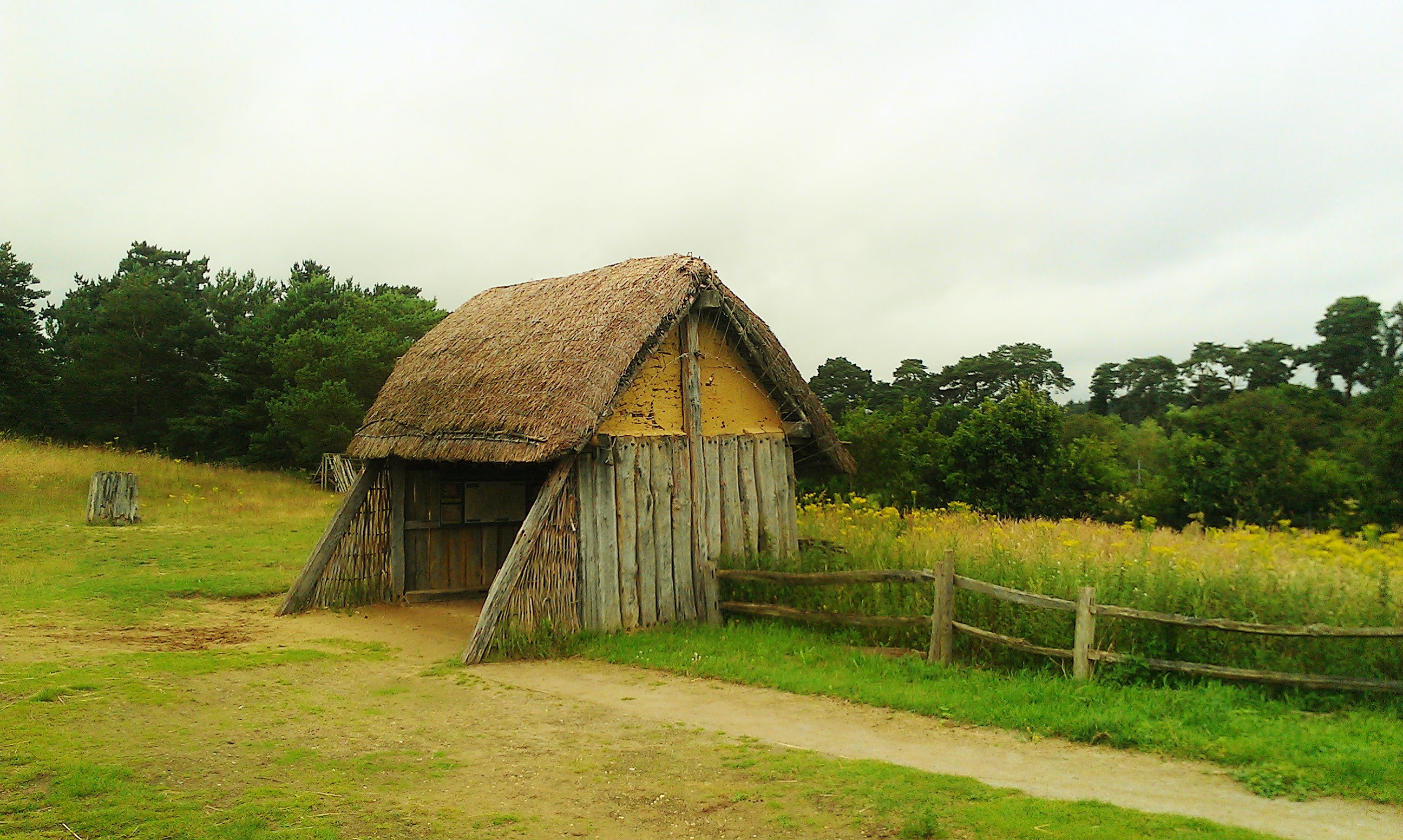
The information hut.

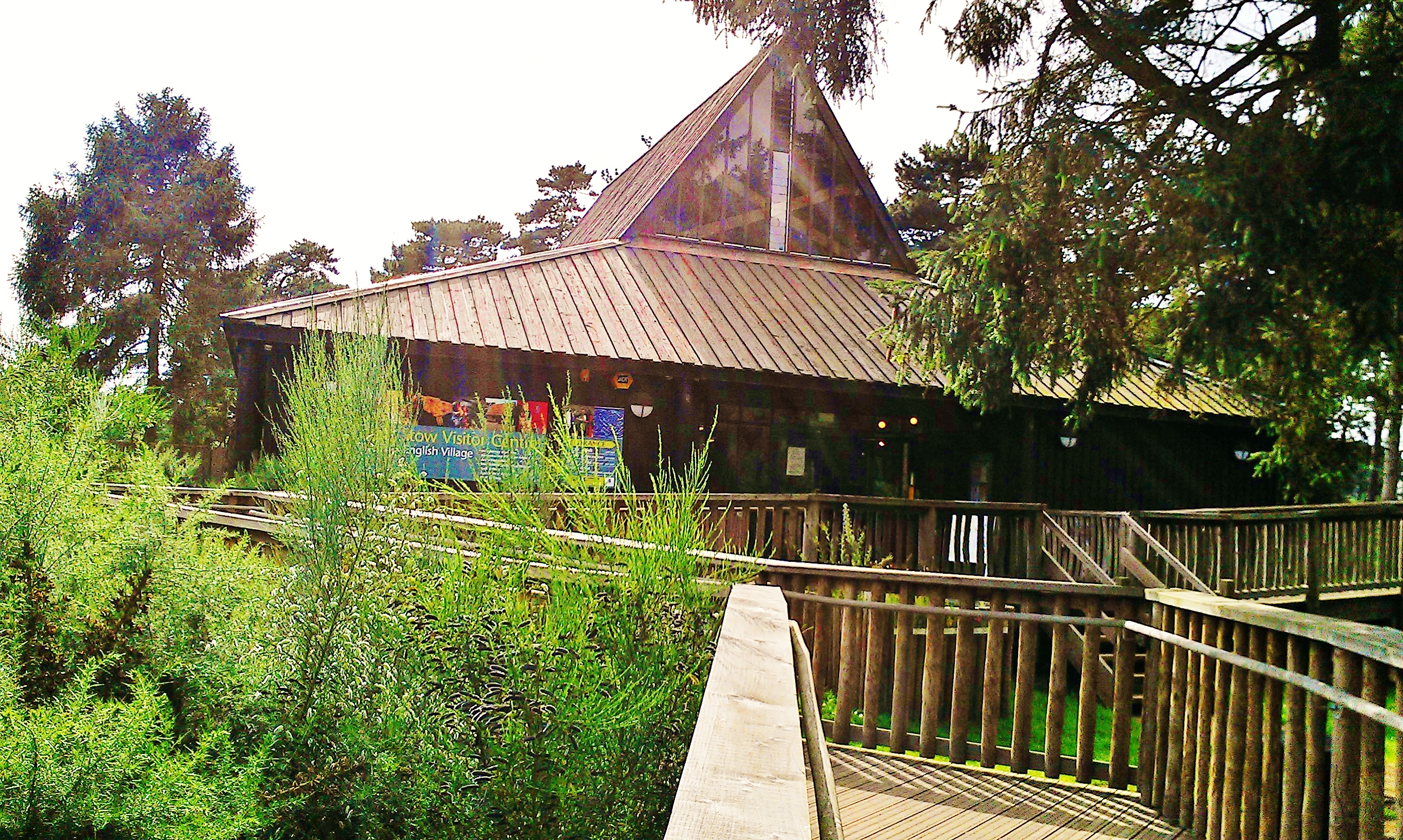
The information centre at West Stow.

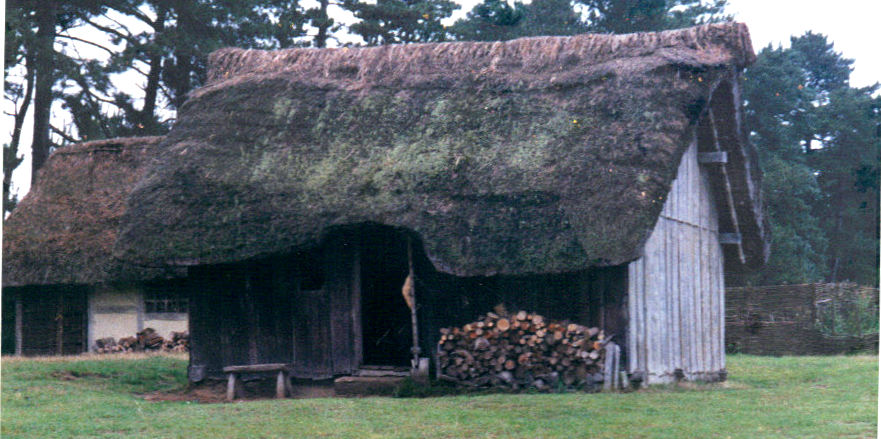
One of the reconstructed Anglo Saxon houses at West Stow

== See also ==
- Butser Ancient Farm
- Flag Fen
