= The Hobbit: The Desolation of Smaug (soundtrack) =

Soundtrack album by Howard Shore
- Released: 10 December 2013
- Recorded: 2013
- Studios: Wellington Town Hall, Wellington
- Length: 116:27 (standard); 129:17 (special edition)
- Labels: WaterTower; Decca
- Producers: Howard Shore; Peter Jackson; Fran Walsh; Philippa Boyens

Singles from The Hobbit: The Desolation of Smaug
- 1. "I See Fire" Released: 5 November 2013

The Hobbit: The Desolation of Smaug: Original Motion Picture Soundtrack is the soundtrack album to the 2013 film The Hobbit: The Desolation of Smaug directed by Peter Jackson, which is the second instalment in The Hobbit trilogy. The film score is composed by Howard Shore and released through WaterTower Music and Decca Records on 10 December 2013. Ed Sheeran wrote and performed the song "I See Fire" which was released as the lead single from the album.

== Background and release ==
Howard Shore who composed music for The Hobbit: An Unexpected Journey (2012) returned to score The Desolation of Smaug. He recorded the score at the Wellington Town Hall during September and October. The New Zealand Symphony Orchestra performed the score, which cancelled their concert in New Zealand to prioritize recording the film's orchestral portions. The Gamelan orchestra from the Victoria University of Wellington performed additional orchestra while the choir portions were performed by London Voices and Tiffin' boy choir. It was orchestrated by Conrad Pope and James Sizemore, with Pope conducting. Besides the orchestra and choir, the score accompanied vocal and instrumental soloists, namely soprano Grace Davidson and singer-songwriter Ed Sheeran.

Sheeran performed the song "I See Fire" which was featured in the end credits. The song was released as the lead single from the album on 5 November. The album was released on 10 December 2013 through WaterTower Music and Decca Records in two-discs in both standard and special editions.

== Reception ==
TheOneRing.net described the score of The Desolation of Smaug as "extraordinar[ily good]" with many new themes, noting in particular the Smaug theme which powerfully "dominates the later scenes", and the Tauriel theme which recalled "many a swashbuckling adventure from cinema history". Christian Clemmensen of Filmtracks wrote "Like The Return of the King and An Unexpected Journey, therefore, The Desolation of Smaug merits a split rating. You have to keep your perspective when approaching this work, tempering your expectations and accepting the benefits along with the drawbacks." Jonathan Broxton of Movie Music UK wrote "What Howard Shore is achieving through his Lord of the Rings music, and now through these Hobbit scores, is nothing short of remarkable – a truly immersive world of music which follows a strict leitmotivic design, but is fluid enough to introduce themes for new characters, places and concepts as each new film requires, without compromising the integrity of the work as a whole. While the music in The Desolation of Smaug doesn't have the crowd-pleasing memorability of some of the other works in the series, while doesn't have as much choral bombast as previous entries, and while the inherent darkness of many of the themes and performances may be off-putting to some who need more lightness in their music, its intellectual design is utterly flawless, and its orchestration is consistently interesting. This is one of the scores of the year."

A critic from Classic FM wrote "There are snatches and remnants of themes from the previous scores to be picked out here but the overwhelming atmosphere is generally more dark and brooding than triumphal - lots of snarling brass and low rumbles." James Southall of Movie Wave wrote "The Desolation of Smaug doesn't have that memorable theme, but instead it has some very fine set pieces and probably around an hour of music that's consistently good. That means that overall it's a distinct step up over its predecessor – it suffers from the same faults but Shore injects that little bit more energy into a higher portion of it. It still needs an album producer to go through it meticulously and chop out the fat, but there's more than enough here to make it worth persevering, however hard that is at times." Melissa Redman of Renowned for Sound wrote "Shore has once again created a wondrous soundtrack which will enrich and enhance the film and the audience's emotions throughout. Whether you love music score soundtracks or not, The Desolation of Smaug is definitely one to take notice of." Adrian Horan of York Vision wrote "Shore does a magnificent job in capturing the essence of The Desolation of Smaug in his soundtrack. He stays comfortable in some parts, using old tricks in a new setting; in others, he experiments with what he has learnt across his time as a composer, daring to be different in some aspects, paying off entirely."

== Track listing ==
=== Standard edition ===
Disc 1
| No. | Title | Length |
|---|---|---|
| 1. | "The Quest for Erebor" | 3:23 |
| 2. | "Wilderland" | 4:56 |
| 3. | "The House of Beorn" | 3:42 |
| 4. | "Mirkwood" | 4:27 |
| 5. | "Flies and Spiders" | 7:51 |
| 6. | "The Woodland Realm" | 4:26 |
| 7. | "Feast of Starlight" | 2:49 |
| 8. | "Barrels Out of Bond" | 1:50 |
| 9. | "The Forest River" | 4:54 |
| 10. | "Bard, a Man of Lake-Town" | 2:30 |
| 11. | "The High Fells" | 2:37 |
| 12. | "The Nature of Evil" | 3:20 |
| 13. | "Protector of the Common Folk" | 3:36 |

Disc 2
| No. | Title | Length |
|---|---|---|
| 1. | "Thrice Welcome" | 3:33 |
| 2. | "Girion, Lord of Dale" | 3:33 |
| 3. | "Durin's Folk" | 2:28 |
| 4. | "In the Shadow of the Mountain" | 2:15 |
| 5. | "A Spell of Concealment" | 2:51 |
| 6. | "On the Doorstep" | 7:46 |
| 7. | "The Courage of Hobbits" | 3:00 |
| 8. | "Inside Information" | 3:48 |
| 9. | "Kingsfoil" | 2:25 |
| 10. | "A Liar and a Thief" | 3:40 |
| 11. | "The Hunters" | 9:04 |
| 12. | "Smaug" | 5:24 |
| 13. | "My Armor is Iron" | 5:16 |
| 14. | "I See Fire" (Written and Performed by Ed Sheeran) | 5:00 |
| 15. | "Beyond the Forest" | 5:25 |

=== Special edition ===
The special edition contains one bonus track and twelve extended tracks.

Disc 1
| No. | Title | Length |
|---|---|---|
| 1. | "The Quest for Erebor" | 3:22 |
| 2. | "Wilderland" | 4:56 |
| 3. | "A Necromancer" (Bonus Track) | 2:54 |
| 4. | "The House of Beorn" (Extended Version) | 4:52 |
| 5. | "Mirkwood" (Extended Version) | 5:31 |
| 6. | "Flies and Spiders" (Extended Version) | 9:35 |
| 7. | "The Woodland Realm" (Extended Version) | 5:14 |
| 8. | "Feast of Starlight" | 2:48 |
| 9. | "Barrels Out of Bond" | 1:50 |
| 10. | "The Forest River" (Extended Version) | 5:10 |
| 11. | "Bard, a Man of Lake-Town" (Extended Version) | 3:18 |
| 12. | "The High Fells" (Extended Version) | 3:38 |
| 13. | "The Nature of Evil" | 3:20 |
| 14. | "Protector of the Common Folk" | 3:35 |

Disc 2
| No. | Title | Length |
|---|---|---|
| 1. | "Thrice Welcome" | 3:33 |
| 2. | "Girion, Lord of Dale" (Extended Version) | 4:15 |
| 3. | "Durin's Folk" (Extended Version) | 3:04 |
| 4. | "In the Shadow of the Mountain" | 2:15 |
| 5. | "A Spell of Concealment" (Extended Version) | 3:22 |
| 6. | "On the Doorstep" | 7:46 |
| 7. | "The Courage of Hobbits" | 3:00 |
| 8. | "Inside Information" | 3:48 |
| 9. | "Kingsfoil" | 2:25 |
| 10. | "A Liar and a Thief" | 3:41 |
| 11. | "The Hunters" (Extended Version) | 9:55 |
| 12. | "Smaug" (Extended Version) | 6:29 |
| 13. | "My Armor is Iron" | 5:16 |
| 14. | "I See Fire" (Written and Performed by Ed Sheeran) | 5:00 |
| 15. | "Beyond the Forest" | 5:25 |

== Charts ==
| Chart (2013–14) | Peak position |
|---|---|
| Australian Albums (ARIA) | 60 |
| Australian Classical/Crossover Albums (ARIA) | 2 |
| Austrian Albums (Ö3 Austria) | 29 |
| Belgian Albums (Ultratop Flanders) | 44 |
| Belgian Albums (Ultratop Wallonia) | 97 |
| Dutch Albums (Album Top 100) | 51 |
| French Albums (SNEP) | 103 |
| German Albums (Offizielle Top 100) | 25 |
| Irish Classical Albums (IRMA) | 7 |
| Norwegian Albums (VG-lista) | 40 |
| Scottish Albums (Official Charts) | 70 |
| South Korean Albums (Gaon) | 84 |
| Spanish Albums (Promusicae) | 39 |
| Swiss Albums (Schweizer Hitparade) | 51 |
| UK Albums (Official Charts) | 69 |
| UK Album Downloads (Official Charts) | 46 |
| UK Soundtrack Albums (Official Charts) | 1 |
| US Billboard 200 | 39 |
| US Independent Albums (Billboard) | 4 |
| US Top Current Albums (Billboard) | 34 |
| US Top Soundtracks (Billboard) | 6 |
| Chart (2021) | Peak position |
| Polish Albums (ZPAV) | 48 |

== Accolades ==
| Organization | Award category | Recipients | Result |
|---|---|---|---|
| Denver Film Critics Society | Best Original Score | Howard Shore | Nominated |
| Houston Film Critics Society Awards | Best Original Song | Ed Sheeran ("I See Fire") | Nominated |
| Grammy Award | Best Song Written for Visual Media | Ed Sheeran ("I See Fire") | Nominated |
| Motion Picture Sound Editors Golden Reel Awards | Best Sound Editing: Music Score in a Feature Film | Mark Willsher | Nominated |
| Phoenix Film Critics Society | Best Original Score | Howard Shore | Nominated |
| Satellite Awards | Best Original Song | Ed Sheeran ("I See Fire") | Nominated |
| Saturn Awards | Best Music | Howard Shore | Nominated |
| St. Louis Gateway Film Critics Association | Best Musical Score | Howard Shore | Nominated |
