= The Hobbit: The Desolation of Smaug =

2013 film directed by Peter Jackson

- Theatrical release poster
- Directed by: Peter Jackson
- Screenplay by: Fran Walsh; Philippa Boyens; Peter Jackson; Guillermo del Toro
- Based on: The Hobbit by J. R. R. Tolkien
- Produced by: Carolynne Cunningham; Zane Weiner; Fran Walsh; Peter Jackson
- Starring: Ian McKellen; Martin Freeman; Richard Armitage; Benedict Cumberbatch; Evangeline Lilly; Lee Pace; Luke Evans; Ken Stott; James Nesbitt; Orlando Bloom
- Cinematography: Andrew Lesnie
- Edited by: Jabez Olssen
- Music by: Howard Shore
- Production companies: New Line Cinema; Metro-Goldwyn-Mayer Pictures; WingNut Films
- Distributed by: Warner Bros. Pictures
- Release dates: 2 December 2013 (Los Angeles premiere); 12 December 2013 (New Zealand); 13 December 2013 (United States)
- Running time: 161 minutes
- Countries: New Zealand; United States
- Language: English
- Budget: $217–250 million
- Box office: $959 million

The Hobbit: The Desolation of Smaug is a 2013 epic fantasy film directed by Peter Jackson from a screenplay by Fran Walsh, Philippa Boyens, Jackson, and Guillermo del Toro, based on the 1937 novel The Hobbit by J. R. R. Tolkien. The sequel to 2012's The Hobbit: An Unexpected Journey, the film is the second instalment in The Hobbit trilogy, acting as a prequel to Jackson's The Lord of the Rings trilogy.

The film follows Bilbo Baggins as he continues to accompany Thorin Oakenshield and his fellow dwarves on a quest to reclaim the Lonely Mountain from the dragon Smaug. Pursuing them are the vengeful orcs Azog the Defiler and his son Bolg, while Gandalf the Grey investigates the return of a long-forgotten evil force in the ruins of Dol Guldur. The ensemble cast includes Ian McKellen, Martin Freeman, Richard Armitage, Benedict Cumberbatch, Evangeline Lilly, Lee Pace, Luke Evans, Ken Stott, James Nesbitt, and Orlando Bloom.

The films were shot simultaneously in 3D at a projection rate of 48 frames per second, with principal photography taking place around New Zealand and at Pinewood Studios. Additional filming took place throughout May 2013.

The Desolation of Smaug premiered in Los Angeles on 2 December 2013, and was released on 12 December in New Zealand and on 13 December in the United States. Produced by Warner Bros Pictures through its subsidiary New Line Cinema, the film received mostly positive reviews and grossed $959 million at the worldwide box office, making it the fourth highest-grossing film of 2013. The film received numerous accolades; at the 86th Academy Awards, it was nominated for Best Sound Editing, Best Sound Mixing, and Best Visual Effects.

The final instalment of the trilogy, The Hobbit: The Battle of the Five Armies, was released in 2014.

== Plot ==
Following their battle with Azog and his Orc party, (Note: As depicted in The Hobbit: An Unexpected Journey (2012)) Thorin Oakenshield and his company are ushered by Gandalf to the nearby home of Beorn, a skin-changer who can take the form of a bear. That night, Azog is summoned to Dol Guldur by the Necromancer, who commands him to marshal his forces for war. Azog delegates the hunt for Thorin to his son Bolg.

After telling the company about the dangers of Mirkwood, including the Necromancer's rise and the Wood-elves being dangerous, Beorn escorts the company to the borders of Mirkwood, where Gandalf discovers Black Speech imprinted on an old ruin. This, and a prior request by Galadriel, prompts him to investigate the tombs of the Nazgûl. Before leaving the company, he warns them to remain on the path. They lose their way in the forest and are ensnared by giant spiders. Bilbo frees the dwarves with the help of the invisibility ring and begins to understand its dark influence when he drops the ring and brutally kills a giant centipede to retrieve it.

The remaining spiders are killed by the Wood-elves led by Tauriel and Legolas, who capture the Dwarves and bring Thorin before their king, Thranduil. Thorin confronts the king about neglecting the Dwarves of Erebor following Smaug's attack 60 years earlier and is consequently imprisoned with the other Dwarves. Having avoided capture, Bilbo helps them escape in empty wine barrels sent downstream. They are pursued by Wood-elves and ambushed by Bolg and his Orc party, resulting in a three-way battle as they rush down the river in the barrels. The Dwarves escape both groups of pursuers, but Kíli is wounded with a Morgul shaft. Thranduil seals off his kingdom when an Orc captive reveals that an evil army is amassing in the south, but Tauriel decides to leave and assist the Dwarves, and Legolas goes after her. Gandalf and Radagast investigate the tombs of the Nazgûl and find them empty. Gandalf discovers that the Nine have been called to Dol Guldur, deducing that Sauron has returned and is preparing for war.

The company is smuggled into Esgaroth by a bargeman called Bard. Thorin promises the Master of Laketown a share of the mountain's treasure, and they are given arms and sent off to the mountain. Due to his injury, Kíli is forced to remain behind at Bard's home, tended to by Fíli, Óin, and Bofur. Bilbo discovers the hidden entrance in the Lonely Mountain and is sent inside to retrieve the Arkenstone. However, he accidentally awakens Smaug, who reveals his knowledge of the dwarves' plot.

In Laketown, Bard, a descendant of Dale's last ruler, prepares his ancestor's last black arrow in fear of an attack by Smaug, but is arrested by the Master. Bolg and his Orcs infiltrate Laketown and attack the four Dwarves, but Tauriel and Legolas arrive to defeat them, while Bolg escapes.

Meanwhile, Gandalf enters Dol Guldur alone after sending Radagast to warn Galadriel of their discovery at the tombs. The Necromancer overpowers Gandalf and reveals himself as Sauron. Gandalf is captured, as he watches helplessly as Azog and an Orc army march from Dol Guldur towards the Lonely Mountain. Inside the mountain, during a long chase, Bilbo and the Dwarves rekindle the mountain's forge using Smaug's flames and melt a large golden statue, hoping to bury Smaug alive in the molten gold. They do so, but Smaug emerges from the gold, stumbles out of the mountain and flies off to destroy Laketown as Bilbo watches in despair.

== Cast ==
- Martin Freeman as Bilbo Baggins: A hobbit hired by the 13 dwarves, on the advice of wizard Gandalf, to accompany them on a quest to reclaim the Lonely Mountain from Smaug.
- Ian McKellen as Gandalf the Grey: An Istari wizard who recruits Bilbo and helps to arrange the quest to reclaim the dwarves' lost treasure in Erebor.
- Richard Armitage as Thorin Oakenshield II: The leader of the Company of dwarves and the true heir to Erebor's throne who has returned to reclaim Erebor from Smaug.
- Benedict Cumberbatch as Smaug (vocal performance/motion-capture): A great dragon of Middle-earth who claimed the Lonely Mountain, its vast treasures and the surrounding human areas.
  - Cumberbatch also plays The Necromancer: A mysterious sorcerer residing in Dol Guldur with the ability to summon the spirits of the dead, who is later revealed to be the Dark Lord Sauron.
- Evangeline Lilly as Tauriel: The elven chief of the Mirkwood Guards serving under Thranduil, who develops romantic feelings towards Kili and falls in love with him.
- Luke Evans as Bard the Bowman: A skilled archer living in Esgaroth and the heir of Girion, the last king of old Dale.
  - Evans also plays Bard's ancestor, Girion, in a flashback.
- Lee Pace as Thranduil: The aloof and cold-hearted Elven king of the northern part of Mirkwood (the Woodland Realm).
- Stephen Fry as Master of Lake-town: The pompous and greedy mayor of the settlement of Men at Lake-town near the Lonely Mountain.
- Orlando Bloom as Legolas Greenleaf: An elf from Mirkwood, prince of the Woodland Realm, and Thranduil's son.
- Graham McTavish as Dwalin: Balin's brother.
- Ken Stott as Balin: Dwalin's brother.
- Aidan Turner as Kíli: One of Thorin's nephews and Fili's younger brother. He develops romantic feelings towards the Elf Tauriel and falls in love with her.
- Dean O'Gorman as Fíli: Another of Thorin's nephews and Kili's older brother.
- Mark Hadlow as Dori: Nori and Ori's brother.
- Jed Brophy as Nori: Dori and Ori's brother.
- Adam Brown as Ori: Dori and Nori's brother.
- John Callen as Óin: Glóin's brother.
- Peter Hambleton as Glóin: Óin's brother and father of Gimli, the noble Dwarf who accompanies Frodo on his quest to destroy the One Ring.
- William Kircher as Bifur: Bofur and Bombur's cousin.
- James Nesbitt as Bofur: Bombur's brother and Bifur's cousin.
- Stephen Hunter as Bombur: Bofur's brother and Bifur's cousin.
- Cate Blanchett as Galadriel: An elven co-ruler of Lothlórien along with her husband, Lord Celeborn.
- Mikael Persbrandt as Beorn: A skin-changer who can assume the appearance of a great black bear.
- Sylvester McCoy as Radagast the Brown: An Istari wizard whose wisdom is based on nature and wildlife.
- Manu Bennett as Azog the Defiler: An orc and the nemesis of Thorin Oakenshield, on whom he seeks revenge for losing his forearm and hand in battle.
- Lawrence Makoare as Bolg: Son of Azog the Defiler.
- Craig Hall as Galion: Thranduil's butler, whose fondness for drink allows for Bilbo and the dwarves' escape attempt.
- Ryan Gage as Alfrid: Conniving, arrogant, toadying servant of the Master of Laketown.
- John Bell as Bain: Bard's son, who is described as "confident and brave and ready to do battle if required even though he is still a boy."
- Mark Mitchinson as Braga: captain of the Lake-town Guard.
- Ben Mitchell as Narzug: An orc who gets interrogated by Thranduil after the ambush at the River Gate.
- Stephen Ure as Fimbul, Azog's second-in-command
- Robin Kerr as Elros: An elf of the Woodland Realm who is a captain of the Woodland Guard and Keeper of the Keys - initially charged with watching the dwarves, he is later charged with watching the Front Gate of Thranduil's Halls.
- Simon London as Feren: An elf of the Woodland Realm.
- Dallas Barnett as Bill Ferny Snr: An assassin sent by Azog to kill Thorin Oakenshield in Bree and retrieve the Key to Erebor.

The following appear only in the Extended Edition

- Antony Sher as Thrain: Thorin's father who is held captive in Sauron's stronghold of Dol Guldur.

Additionally, Peter Jackson makes a cameo appearance in the film, reprising his role as the man eating a carrot in Bree, his daughter Katie portrays Barliman Butterbur's wife Betsy, Philippa Boyens's daughter Phoebe and scale double Kiran Shah appear as a waitress and a Hobbit in the Prancing Pony, James Nesbitt's daughters Peggy and Mary portray Sigrid and Tilda, the daughters of Bard, Stephen Colbert and his family along with WingNut Films' assistant Norman Kali and producer Zane Weiner appear as Lake-town spies, and editor Jabez Olssen appears as a fishmonger. Brian Sergent (who portrayed the Hobbit Ted Sandyman in the extended edition of Fellowship of the Ring) and Peter Vere-Jones (a frequent voice actor collaborator of Jackson's) provide the voices of the spiders in Mirkwood. This was the final performance of Vere-Jones before his death in January 2021.

== Production ==
Most of the filming was finished during 2012, ending in July 2012. During May 2013, additional shooting for the film and The Hobbit: The Battle of the Five Armies began in New Zealand, lasting 10 weeks. Unmanned aerial vehicles or drones were used for some shots in the film.

=== Score ===
The musical score for The Desolation of Smaug was composed and conducted by Howard Shore in association with local New Zealand writing teams. It was performed by the New Zealand Symphony Orchestra. The original motion picture soundtrack album was released on 10 December 2013. It received positive reviews, especially for its new themes.

English singer-songwriter Ed Sheeran wrote and recorded "I See Fire", which plays during the end credits. The song was released on iTunes on 5 November 2013.

== Release ==
=== Marketing ===
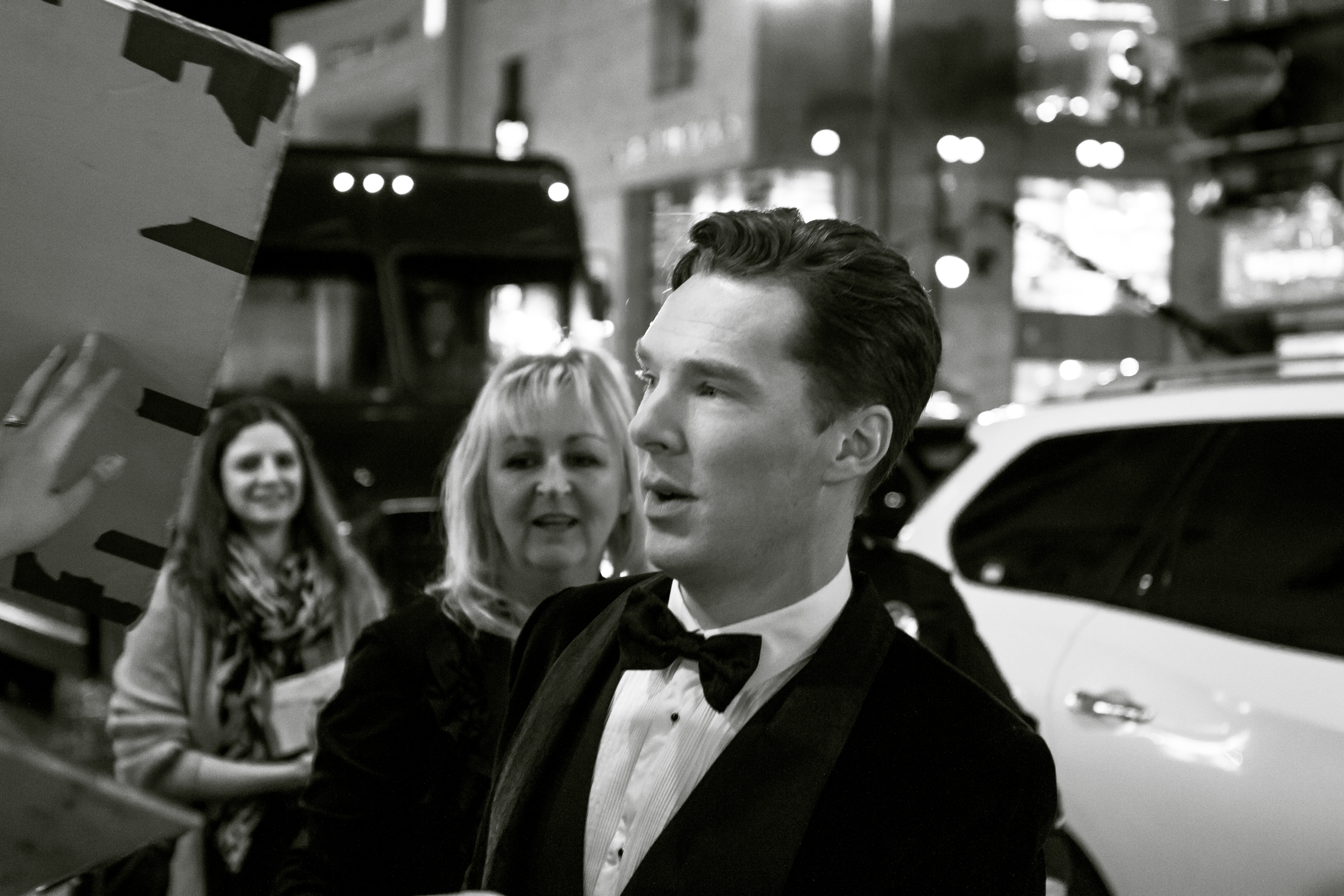
Benedict Cumberbatch at the Los Angeles premiere of the film.

Peter Jackson provided the first details about the second film in the series at a live event held on 24 March 2013. The access code was attached to the DVD editions of The Hobbit: An Unexpected Journey. The live-broadcast event revealed some plot details; Jackson said that the role of Tauriel, acted by Evangeline Lilly, is a part of the elven guard and a bodyguard of the Elvenking, Thranduil. In addition, he revealed a scene from the film in which Gandalf and Radagast the Brown search for the Necromancer fortress and discover that the Ringwraiths have been released from their graves. The first trailer for the film was released on 11 June 2013. On 4 November 2013, an extra long three-minute trailer/sneak peek was released and revealed new footage and major plot points. On 4 November 2013, a special Desolation of Smaug live online fan event, hosted by Anderson Cooper in New York, was held across eleven different cities with participants including Peter Jackson, Jed Brophy, Evangeline Lilly, Lee Pace, Orlando Bloom, Luke Evans, Andy Serkis and Richard Armitage.

Martin Freeman, Richard Armitage, Benedict Cumberbatch, Luke Evans, Evangeline Lilly, Peter Jackson and, to a lesser extent, Orlando Bloom and Ian McKellen, took part in the press tour, appearing on talk shows and giving interviews before the film's release.

=== Theatrical release ===
The film premiered in Los Angeles at the Dolby Theatre on 2 December 2013, and was released internationally on 11 December 2013 and in the United Kingdom and United States on 13 December 2013.

An extended edition of the film had a limited re-release on 7 October 2015, accompanied by a special greeting from Peter Jackson.

=== Home media ===
The Hobbit: The Desolation of Smaug was released on DVD, Blu-ray, and Blu-ray 3D on 7 April 2014 in the United Kingdom and on 8 April 2014 in the United States. Three different versions were released: a Limited Collector's Edition Blu-ray, Blu-ray 3D, DVD, and digital download combo pack; a Blu-ray 3D combo pack; a Blu-ray combo pack, and a two-disc DVD special edition. Extras include three making-of featurettes, 4 production web videos, and a music video for "I See Fire" by Ed Sheeran. The film's home video sales earned a revenue of $95.1 million with 4.7 million copies sold, making it the fifth best-selling title of 2014.

An extended edition of The Desolation of Smaug was released digitally on 21 October 2014, and was released on DVD, Blu-ray, and 3D Blu-ray on 3 November 2014 in the United Kingdom, and 4 November 2014 in the United States, with 25 minutes of new material and original music.

The Desolation of Smaug was released in Ultra HD Blu-ray on 30 November 2020 in the United Kingdom and on 1 December 2020 in the United States, along with the other films of the trilogy, including both the theatrical and the extended editions of the films.

== Reception ==
=== Box office ===
The Hobbit: The Desolation of Smaug grossed $258.4 million in North America and $700.6 million in other countries for a worldwide total of $959 million. Calculating in all expenses, Deadline Hollywood estimated that the film made a profit of $134.1 million. It is the fourth highest-grossing 2013 film, and grossed $209 million worldwide on its opening weekend.

In North America, The Desolation of Smaug earned $8.8 million during its midnight opening, making it the second-highest December showing ever, behind only the first instalment. The film topped the box office on its opening day with $31.2 million. It remained in first place throughout its opening weekend grossing $73.6 million, a 13% drop from its predecessor. The Desolation of Smaug was in first place at the box office for three consecutive weekends.

Outside North America, The Desolation of Smaug was released internationally on 16,405 screens. The film earned $135.4 million in its opening weekend. Its largest openings occurred in China ($33.0 million), Germany ($19.0 million) and the United Kingdom, Ireland and Malta ($15.2 million). It topped the box office outside North America on four consecutive weekends and five in total. It is the highest-grossing film of 2013 in many European countries, as well as in New Zealand and Fiji.

=== Critical response ===
Following the Los Angeles premiere, Metro noted that early critical reaction was "glowing", with critics describing it as a "spectacle", while The Guardian reported that it was receiving "much stronger early reviews". However, before the film's theatrical release, E! reported that reviews had been "mixed", but stated they were still "much better" than the previous film. After the film's international release, MTV reported that the film has garnered a "positive" critical reaction, while the Los Angeles Times stated the consensus is that the film "reinvigorates" the series, putting it "back on course". On review aggregator Rotten Tomatoes the film has 74% approval rating with an average rating of 6.80/10 based on 251 reviews from professional critics. The website's consensus reads, "While still slightly hamstrung by "middle chapter" narrative problems and its formidable length, The Desolation of Smaug represents a more confident, exciting second chapter for the Hobbit series. On Metacritic, the film has a score of 66 out of 100 based on 44 reviews, indicating "generally favorable" reviews. Audiences polled by CinemaScore, during the opening weekend, gave it an average grade of "A−" on a scale from A+ to F, down from the first film which scored an "A" grade.

Nick de Semlyen of Empire awarded the film five stars out of five and wrote that "Middle-earth's got its mojo back. A huge improvement on the previous instalment, this takes our adventurers into uncharted territory and delivers spectacle by the ton", while Richard Corliss of TIME declared it one of the top ten films of 2013, and wrote "In all, this is a splendid achievement, close to the grandeur of Jackson's Lord of the Rings films." Justin Chang of Variety wrote that "After a bumpy beginning with An Unexpected Journey, Peter Jackson's 'Hobbit' trilogy finds its footing in this much more exciting and purposeful second chapter." Todd McCarthy of Hollywood Reporter wrote that "Nearly everything... represents an improvement over the first instalment of Peter Jackson's three-part adaptation of J.R.R. Tolkien's beloved creation." He also praised the High Frame Rate of The Desolation of Smaug as being better than that of An Unexpected Journey. Mark Hughes, who reviewed the film for Forbes, was highly enthusiastic, and felt "The Desolation of Smaug is another grand entry in the Tolkien saga, raising the emotional and physical stakes while revealing more of the sinister forces," before concluding "It's pleasing to see a filmmaker this in love with storytelling, this committed to creating entire worlds... that's a rare thing indeed, and for it to turn out so well is even more rare. It's a sight to behold, and you won't be sorry you did."

Peter Bradshaw of The Guardian scored the film four stars out of five, writing, "It's mysterious and strange, and yet Jackson also effortlessly conjures up that genial quality that distinguishes 'The Hobbit' from the more solemn 'Rings' stories." Total Film also scored the film four stars out of five, but reviewer Matt Maytum noted that, in his opinion, the film suffered "from middle-act wobbles." Despite this, he praised the "rousing action... incredible visuals... and one stupendous dragon", and concluded his review saying "There's a lot to admire in The Desolation of Smaug." Jim Vejvoda, who reviewed the film for IGN, awarded it 8.5 out of 10, and felt "It's a breathlessly told, action-packed crowd-pleaser that restores the luster of the saga for those underwhelmed by its predecessor and leaves you excited for the final chapter in the trilogy."

Conversely, Peter Travers, who reviewed the film for Rolling Stone, gave it two and a half stars out of four. He felt it was "a little less long and a little less boring" than the first instalment, and offered praise for the depiction of Smaug, saying "as a digital creation, Smaug is a bloody wonder of slithering fright." He was, however, very critical of the film's padding of a "slender novel", but concluded: "I'd endure another slog through Middle-Earth just to spend more time with Smaug". Robbie Collin of The Daily Telegraph was even less admiring, and awarded it two stars out of five. He too criticised the decision to turn Tolkien's book into three films and felt Jackson "is mostly stalling for time: two or three truly great sequences tangled up in long beards and longer pit-stops." He continued, writing "There is an awful lot of Desolation to wade through before we arrive, weary and panting, on Smaug's rocky porch," and disapproved of the introduction of a love triangle to Tolkien's narrative, adding: "Maybe this really is what a lot of people want to see from a film version of The Hobbit, but let's at least accept that Tolkien would probably not have been among them."
