= List of Middle-earth characters =

The following is a list of notable characters from J. R. R. Tolkien's Middle-earth legendarium. The list is for characters from Tolkien's writings only.

== A ==
- Aragorn: Son of Arathorn, descendant of Isildur. A principal figure in The Fellowship of the Ring and The Two Towers, and the title character in The Return of the King, he becomes king over the reunited kingdoms of Gondor and Arnor.
- Arwen: Daughter of Elrond Half-elven and Celebrían. Marries Aragorn at the end of the War of the Ring and becomes queen of the reunited kingdoms of Gondor and Arnor.

== B ==
- Balin: Dwarf companion of Thorin Oakenshield in The Hobbit. Slain during an attempt to retake Moria.
- Bard the Bowman: Man of Esgaroth who slew Smaug the dragon.
- Beorn: Skin-changer who resides in the region of Mirkwood and takes the form of a great bear.
- Bilbo Baggins: Title character of The Hobbit. Discovered the One Ring after its loss by Gollum. Cousin of younger Frodo Baggins, who calls Bilbo "Uncle".
- Boromir: Member of the Fellowship of the Ring, son and heir to Denethor II of Gondor. Slain by Uruk-hai at Amon Hen.

== C ==
- Celeborn: Elf Lord of Lothlórien and the husband of Galadriel, Lady of the Golden Wood. He fought during the War of the Ring defending Lothlórien. Celeborn went to the Grey Havens and sailed for the Undying Lands in the Fourth Age.
- Celebrimbor: Noldorin smith and grandson of Fëanor, who led the creation of all but one of the 20 Rings of Power. Tortured to death by Sauron.

== D ==
- Denethor: Steward of Gondor (formally Denethor II) during the events of The Lord of the Rings. Committed suicide during the Siege of Gondor.

== E ==
- Eärendil and Elwing: Half-elven couple, heroes of the War of Wrath as well as the progenitors of the royal Númenorean and Dúnedain bloodlines through their sons Elrond and Elros.
- Elendil: Númenorean nobleman whose sons founded the kingdoms of Arnor and Gondor in Middle-earth. Slain during the final battle between Sauron and the Last Alliance of Elves and Men.
- Elrond: Ruler of the elven refuge of Rivendell. Son of the Half-elves Eärendil and Elwing, husband of Celebrían, father of Arwen, Elladan and Elrohir.
- Éomer: Brother of Éowyn, nephew and heir of Théoden, King of Rohan. Son-in-law of Prince Imrahil of Dol Amroth.
- Éowyn: Sister of Éomer and member of the royal house of Rohan. Slayer of the Witch King of Angmar. Married Faramir after the War of the Ring.

== F ==
- Faramir: Son of Denethor II of Gondor, brother of Boromir, and husband of Éowyn following the War of the Ring.
- Fëanor: Son of Finwë and Míriel. The greatest Noldorin smith to have ever lived, he forged the three jewels known as Silmarils. Slain by Balrogs.
- Fíli: Son of Dís; nephew of Thorin. Older brother to Kíli. Slain defending Thorin in the Battle of Five Armies.
- Fingolfin: Son of Finwë and Indis. First High King of the Noldor who left Valinor for Middle-earth. Slain by Morgoth.
- Fingon: Son of Fingolfin. Rescues Maedhros, pleasing Fëanor, who lets Fingolfin become King in his stead.
- Finrod Felagund: Grandson of Finwë and Elvenking of Nargothrond. He died from wounds sustained by saving his friend Beren from a werewolf.
- Finwë and Míriel: Parents of Fëanor and leaders of the Noldorin migrants to the Undying Lands. Míriel dies in childbirth, while Finwë is slain by Morgoth.
- Frodo Baggins: Cousin (informally, 'nephew') of Bilbo Baggins who bore the One Ring to its destruction in Mount Doom.

== G ==
- Galadriel: Co-ruler of Lothlórien alongside her husband Celeborn. Relative of numerous notable characters in Tolkien's legendarium through bloodline and kinship.
- Gandalf: A wizard. A member of the Fellowship of the Ring. Killed in battle in Moria, but returns to play a leading role in the defeat of Sauron.
- Gil-galad: Last High King of the Noldor, who ruled during the Second Age. Formed the Last Alliance of Elves and Men with Elendil, and fell in combat against Sauron's forces.
- Glorfindel: Noldorin elf-lord notable for his death and resurrection within Tolkien's legendarium.
- Gimli: Dwarven member of the Fellowship of the Ring and a major character in The Lord of the Rings.
- Goldberry: Mysterious entity known as the River-woman's daughter, wife of Tom Bombadil.
- Gollum: Possessor of the One Ring until taken by Bilbo Baggins. Falls into the Crack of Doom after retaking the ring from Frodo Baggins.
- Gríma Wormtongue: An ally of Saruman who gave false advice to Théoden, King of Rohan. Slain by hobbit militia during the Scouring of the Shire.

== H ==
- Húrin: Human warrior of the First Age, and the father of Túrin Turambar.
- Halbarad: A Dúnadan Ranger of the North, and one of Aragorn's comrades during the weeks leading up to Sauron's final demise.

== I ==
- Isildur: Son of Elendil, and co-founder of the kingdom of Gondor. He cut the One Ring from Sauron's hand at the end of the Second Age, but was later slain by Orks at the Disaster of the Gladden Fields. He was shot by two poisoned arrows (one through his throat and one through his heart).

== K ==
- Kíli: Son of Dís. Thorin Oakenshield's nephew, son of his sister. Died during the Battle of the Five Armies.

== L ==
- Legolas: Elven member of the Fellowship of the Ring and a major character in The Lord of the Rings.
- Lúthien and Beren: The ancestors of the Half-elven bloodline.

== M ==
- Mairon: Sauron's original name before his fall to evil. It means "the Admirable", contrasted with the name Sauron, which means "the Abhorred".
- Maedhros: Noldorin elf lord and eldest of the Sons of Fëanor. Committed suicide after recovering one of the lost Silmarils.
- Melian: Maia who took the physical form of an Elf. Queen of Doriath in the First Age. Wife of Elu Thingol and mother of Lúthien.
- Meriadoc "Merry" Brandybuck: A hobbit member of the Fellowship of the Ring and companion of Frodo Baggins. He helped slay the Witch-King of Angmar.
- Morgoth: The first Dark Lord in Tolkien's legendarium, originally known as Melkor. Succeeded by Sauron after his defeat and banishment by the Valar following the War of Wrath.

== P ==
- Peregrin "Pippin" Took: A hobbit member of the Fellowship of the Ring and companion of Frodo Baggins. Served as a Guard of the Citadel of Minas Tirith during the War of the Ring.

== R ==
- Radagast: one of the Five Istari or Wizards who has an affinity with nature.

== S ==
- "Master" Samwise Gamgee: Loyal companion of Frodo Baggins during his journey to Mordor to destroy the One Ring.
- Saruman: A wizard. Once the leader of the Istari, he attempted to form his own empire as a rival of Sauron and was defeated at the Battle of the Hornburg. Murdered by Gríma Wormtongue during the Scouring of the Shire.
- Sauron: The primary antagonist of The Lord of the Rings. He crafted the One Ring, and was destroyed upon its destruction at the end of The Return of the King.
- Shelob: Monstrous spider and last notable spawn of Ungoliant.
- Smaug: A dragon and primary antagonist of The Hobbit. Slain by Bard the Bowman.
- Sméagol: was a Stoor (one of the early hobbit types) that later on became Gollum.

== T ==
- Théoden: King of Rohan, uncle of Éomer and Éowyn. Fell in battle during the Battle of the Pelennor Fields.
- Thingol: Elvenking of the Sindarin realm of Doriath in the First Age. Husband of Melian and father of Lúthien. Slain by dwarves over a dispute concerning one of the Silmarils.
- Thranduil: Elvenking of the Silvan realm of Mirkwood, father of Legolas.
- Thorin Oakenshield: Dwarf noble who led the company of dwarves that retook Erebor from the dragon Smaug in The Hobbit. Slain during the Battle of the Five Armies.
- Tom Bombadil: A mysterious figure who aided the hobbits during their departure from the Shire in The Fellowship of the Ring.
- Treebeard: Leader of the Ents in The Lord of the Rings.
- Tuor and Idril: Heroes of the First Age and parents of Eärendil as the second married union of Men and Elves. Left Middle-earth for Valinor, where Tuor is said to be counted amongst the Elven kindreds.
- Túrin Turambar: A First Age hero who is embroiled in a tragic fate along with the rest of his family and ultimately committed suicide.

== U ==
- Ungoliant: Monstrous spider spirit. Progenitor of the Great Spiders and of Shelob.

== W ==
- Watcher in the Water: A mysterious aquatic creature that lives in a pool guarding the gates of Moria.
- Witch-King of Angmar: Lord of the Nazgûl or Ringwraiths. He got enslaved by Sauron, because of the Ring of Power Sauron gave to him.

== See also ==
- List of The Hobbit characters – complete list of characters in The Hobbit
- List of original characters in The Lord of the Rings film series – original characters in Peter Jackson's The Lord of the Rings film trilogy
- List of original characters in The Hobbit film series – original characters in Peter Jackson's The Hobbit film trilogy
- Middle-earth peoples – descriptions of races and groups in the legendarium
- Women in The Lord of the Rings – analysis of female characters in The Lord of the Rings
