= Economy of Middle-earth =

Theme in Tolkien's writing

The economy of Middle-earth is J. R. R. Tolkien's treatment of economics in his fantasy world of Middle-earth. Scholars such as Steven Kelly have commented on the clash of economic patterns embodied in Tolkien's writings, giving as instances the broadly 19th century agrarian but capitalistic economy of the Shire, set against the older world of feudal Gondor. Others have remarked on the culture of gifting and exchange, which reflects that of early Germanic cultures as described in works like Beowulf. A different clash of cultures is addressed by Patrick Curry, who contrasts the pre-modern world of the free peoples of Middle-earth with the industrialising and in his view "soulless" economies of the wizard Saruman and the Dark Lord Sauron, based on machinery, fire, and labour.

Less seriously, economists and financial journalists such as John Carney have explored the possible economic effects of Smaug the dragon's capture of the Dwarves' treasure of gold. Some have suggested this reduction of the money supply would cause a severe economic shock and deflation; others that the real shock was on the supply side, as Smaug had eaten so many productive Dwarves that the trade of the town of Dale would have been seriously reduced.

== Within Middle-earth ==
=== Gifting and exchange ===
Gifts and exchange in Beowulf

Ic ðæt maél geman þaér wé medu þégun
þonne wé gehéton ússum hláforde
in bíorsele ðé ús ðás béagas geaf
þæt wé him ðá gúðgetawa gyldan woldon
gif him þyslicu þearf gelumpe,
helmas ond heard sweord. ...

— Wiglaf on repaying Beowulf's generosity
(lines 2633–2640)
Translation:

I recall that time, where we partook of mead,
when we promised to our lord
in the beer-hall, he who gave us rings,
that we to him for the war-gear wished to repay,
if for him such a need arose,
with helmets and hard swords. ...

— Prose translation
by Benjamin Slade

Tolkien indicated that gifting and exchange are important in parts of Middle-earth. In the Shire, the Hobbits have "mathoms" (Old English: māþum, treasure, gift), objects passed from hand to hand as valued or sometimes unvalued gifts. Many were stored in the museum or Mathom-house at Michel Delving. (Note: Tolkien 1954a Prologue: I. "Concerning Hobbits")

The scholar Jennifer Culver states that Tolkien based his account of gifting and exchange on the Germanic gifting tradition, as described in medieval works such as Beowulf, familiar to Tolkien. There, a lord could "broaden his reach" by giving gifts, while the visible exchange of gifts defined the relative status of the people involved. Culver explores the significance of Sauron's gift of magical rings to the nine Ringwraiths – in exchange for their lives – and the nature of the One Ring itself as an item of exchange.

=== Money and treasure ===
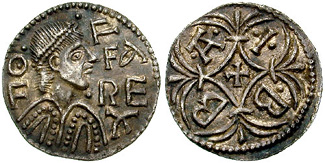
In The Lord of the Rings, Barliman Butterbur makes a payment of 30 silver pennies. (Note: Tolkien 1954a Book 1, ch. 11 "A Knife in the Dark") Early medieval silver penny of Offa of Mercia shown.

Tolkien mentions money and items of value in his Middle-earth writings. The Hobbits used money: in The Hobbit, Bilbo Baggins, leaving the Shire in a hurry, is recorded as forgetting to take any money with him. (Note: Tolkien 1937 2 "Roast Mutton") In The Lord of the Rings, Barliman Butterbur pays 30 silver pennies (Note: Jonathan and Kenneth Padley note that this echoes Judas's fee of 30 silver coins for betraying Jesus, though the two situations were not similar.) compensation for the loss of horses and ponies stolen from The Prancing Pony inn at Bree; one pony cost some four silver pennies. Further, Bilbo gives away "a few pennies" before the birthday party, while at the Council of Elrond, Gandalf uses the phrase "worth a gold piece" of significant news. There is however no indication where such coins might have been minted. The people of Gondor used silver coins as currency. The main coinage was the Castar; a quarter of a Castar was a Tharni. (Note: Tolkien 1996 II. "The Appendix on Languages")

The Dwarves of Moria valued precious materials such as gold and jewels, but most especially the rare metal mithril, which they used to mine:

For here alone in the world was found Moria-silver, or true-silver as some have called it: mithril is the Elvish name. The Dwarves have a name, which they do not tell. Its worth was ten times that of gold, and now it is beyond price; for little is left above ground, and even the Orcs dare not delve here for it. (Note: Tolkien 1954a Book 2, ch. 4 "A Journey in the Dark")

The Wizard Gandalf startles the Dwarf Gimli with a mention of a mail shirt made of mithril:

"Bilbo had a corslet of mithril-rings that Thorin gave him. I wonder what has become of it? Gathering dust still in Michel Delving Mathom-house, I suppose."
"What?" cried Gimli, startled out of his silence. "A corslet of Moria-silver? That was a kingly gift!"
"Yes", said Gandalf. "I never told him, but its worth was greater than the value of the whole Shire and everything in it."

The scholars of international relations Abigail Ruane and Patrick James view Gimli as an exemplar of "neoliberal institutionalists" within the economy of Middle-earth, since his "people avidly pursue gold and treasure". In their view, he and his Dwarves also illustrate the interdependence of nations through their networks of trade and allies; the varied "relationships among Dwarves, Elves, and Men provide a foundation upon which to build and [to] ally against Sauron and illustrate how complex interdependence can reduce perceptions of insecurity and create opportunities for cooperation rather than conflict."

=== Clashing economic patterns ===
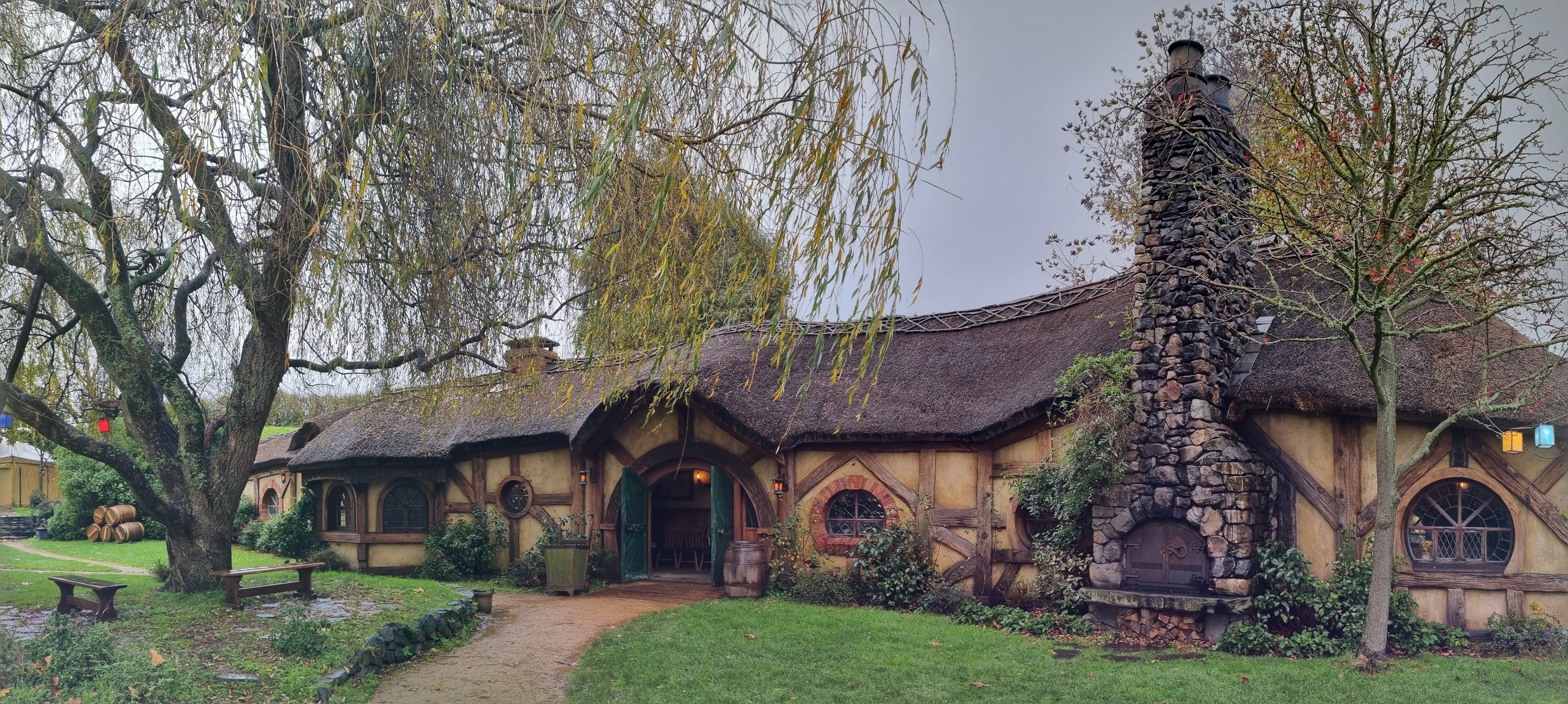
Film set of Hobbiton in the Shire, often described as a pastoral idyll.

Steven Kelly argues that while Tolkien's world is generally viewed as a medieval fantasy world, hence implied to be a pre-capitalistic society, it has some elements of capitalistic society. Citing the philologist and Tolkien scholar Tom Shippey, Kelly states that this is a result of the clash of two major themes in Tolkien's world-building: "the old Northern European world of fairy-tale" to which most of Middle-earth belongs, and "a relatively modern world represented in the Shire", partly modelled on 19th century England. While the former, such as the land of Gondor, has been described as feudal or pre-feudal, with concepts like fiefs. The Shire, on the other hand, has an economy that is both deceptively simple, a self-sufficient agrarian society resistant to capitalism, described even as communist, but with trade and other economic patterns resembling those found in modern capitalist systems. In particular, Kelly argues that the handling of hobbit's pipe-weed can be seen as a case of modern commodity fetishism. Jay Atkins writes in Mallorn that the Shire functions as a distributist economy, as defined by G. K. Chesterton and Hilaire Belloc in the early 20th century: it is respectful of nature, and families own the small-scale means of production. Atkins comments that "The Scouring of the Shire" alludes to socialism, as under Sharkey's unjust rulership, sharing is advocated: only it is all one way, as Sharkey takes away Hobbit property without returning anything.

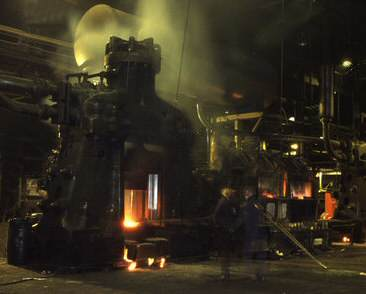
Isengard is industrial: "...hammers thudded. At night plumes of vapour steamed from the vents, lit from beneath with red light". (Note: Tolkien 1954, book 3, ch. 8 "The Road to Isengard") Steam hammer at work, England.

The wizard Saruman's Isengard, on the other hand, is industrial: it produces weapons and machinery made of iron, smelted and forged using trees as fuel; an unusually large and powerful breed of Orcs, able as Treebeard says to fight in daylight, produced rapidly, apparently by some kind of cloning; and a gunpowder-like explosive. (Note: Tolkien 1954, book 3, ch. 4 "Treebeard") Lianne McLarty describes Isengard as a war economy with a military–industrial system to produce the materiel of war.

=== Resistance to soulless economic progress ===
The Tolkien scholar Patrick Curry links the search for economic progress in Middle-earth to industrialisation and a dark sort of magic, that of the wizardry of Sauron and Saruman with wheels and fires and labouring workers, writing that "the Enemy is thus 'Lord of magic and machines'". He contrasts this with the Elvish magic of "enchantment", stating that "in contemporary terms, the domination of financial and technological magic over enchantment ... is something we see confirmed everywhere in Middle-earth today ... [along with the sentiment that] Progress is not only good for us but unavoidable". In Curry's view, Tolkien's Middle-earth writings "invite the reader into a compelling and remarkably complete pre-modern world, saturated with ... values [for] relationships ... with each other, and nature, and ... the spirit", retaining "personal integrity and responsibility and [not] decanted into a soulless calculus of financial profit-and-loss." In short, he writes, "Wisdom in Middle-earth is not a matter of economic, scientific or technological expertise, but of practical and ethical wisdom."

=== Economic interpretations ===
The financial journalist John Carney takes a humorous look at the economic effect of Smaug the dragon and his hoard of treasure captured from the Dwarves. He notes that Francis Woolley, professor of economics at Carleton University, suggested that Smaug's withdrawal of so much gold from circulation represented a severe tightening of monetary policy, which would cause "deflation and depressed economic activity". Against this view, the 150 years between Smaug's capture of the Lonely Mountain and the events in The Hobbit would have allowed the economy to adjust to the shock. On the other hand, the economist Nick Rowe argues on New Keynesian terms that prices might stay high as businesses could hold out awaiting Smaug's downfall. Yet another viewpoint is set out by Eric Crampton, who suggests that the economic shock was on the supply side, as Smaug consumed "thousands of very skilled Dwarven craftsmen", depriving Dale of much of its trade in farm commodities which it had exchanged for Dwarf-produced industrial products. Carney himself suggests that the wizard Gandalf could have used his powers to replace the gold "out of thin air", but just as the Federal Reserve refused to refund the wealth lost to Bernard Madoff's fraudulent Ponzi scheme, Gandalf did not do this. In 2012, Smaug's wealth was estimated at $61 billion, placing him in the Forbes Fictional 15.

Diane Coyle writes in the Financial Times that the sharing economy of the Shire could be improved with a "mathom.com" noticeboard site. Coyle suggests that a sharing site could enable mathoms to circulate more efficiently.

== Derivative works ==
[Sharya-Rana to Haladdin:] "We have lost the most important battle in the history of Arda – the magic of the White Council and the Elves overcame the magic of the Nazgúl – and now the green shoots of reason and progress, bereft of our protection, will be weeded out throughout Middle Earth. The forces of magic will reconfigure this world to their liking, and henceforth it will have no room for technological civilizations like that of Mordor."

— The Last Ringbearer, ch. 16

Kirill Eskov's 1999 fantasy The Last Ringbearer parodies The Lord of the Rings, and is an informal sequel to it. It has been interpreted as a critique of, among other things, Tolkien's anti-modern environmental vision. It portrays Mordor as a society based on rational knowledge, in contrast to the war-mongering, anti-industrialisation faction of Gandalf and the Elves.

== Sources ==
- Curry, Patrick (1998) [1997]. Defending Middle-Earth. HarperCollins. ISBN 978-0-261-10371-9.
- Davis, James G. (2008). "Showing Saruman as Faber: Tolkien and Peter Jackson". Tolkien Studies. 5 (1). Project Muse: 55–71. doi:10.1353/tks.0.0009. ISSN 1547-3163. S2CID 170132182.
- Kocher, Paul H. (1974) [1972]. Master of Middle-earth: The Achievement of J.R.R. Tolkien. Penguin Books. ISBN 0140038779.
- Morton, Timothy (2014). "Deconstruction and/as Ecology". In Garrard, Greg (ed.). The Oxford Handbook of Ecocriticism. Oxford University Press. pp. 291–304. doi:10.1093/oxfordhb/9780199742929.013.005. ISBN 9780199742929.
- Shippey, Tom (2001). J. R. R. Tolkien: Author of the Century. HarperCollins. ISBN 978-0261104013.
- Tolkien, J. R. R. (1937). The Hobbit. United Kingdom: George Allen & Unwin.
- Tolkien, J. R. R. (1954a). The Fellowship of the Ring. The Lord of the Rings. Boston: Houghton Mifflin. OCLC 9552942.
- Tolkien, J. R. R. (1954). The Two Towers. The Lord of the Rings. Boston: Houghton Mifflin. OCLC 1042159111.
- Tolkien, J. R. R. (1996). Christopher Tolkien (ed.). The Peoples of Middle-earth. Boston: Houghton Mifflin. ISBN 978-0-395-82760-4.
