= I See Fire =

Single by Ed Sheeran

from the album The Hobbit: The Desolation of Smaug (Original Motion Picture Soundtrack)
- Released: 5 November 2013
- Recorded: 2013
- Genre: Folk
- Length: 5:00
- Label: WaterTower; Decca
- Songwriter: Ed Sheeran
- Producer: Ed Sheeran

Ed Sheeran singles chronology
"Old School Love" (2013)	"I See Fire" (2013)	"Sing" (2014)

Audio sample
- "I See Fire": file; help

Lyric video
- "I See Fire" on YouTube

"I See Fire" is a song by the English singer-songwriter Ed Sheeran. It was commissioned for the soundtrack of the 2013 film The Hobbit: The Desolation of Smaug, where it was played over the closing credits. The Hobbit director, Peter Jackson, asked Sheeran to write a song for the movie after Jackson's daughter, Katie, suggested Sheeran. Sheeran saw the film, wrote the song, and recorded most of the track elements on the same day.

The song was released as a digital download on 5 November 2013. Its music video was released the same day. It entered the UK Singles Chart at number 13 and reached number one in New Zealand on its sixth week, Sheeran's first number-one single there. "I See Fire" was nominated for a Satellite Award for Best Original Song.

== Background ==
"I See Fire" plays over the first section of the closing credits of The Hobbit: The Desolation of Smaug, an epic fantasy adventure film directed by New Zealand filmmaker Peter Jackson. Released on 13 December 2013, it is the second installment in the three-part film series based on the novel The Hobbit by J. R. R. Tolkien. The Hobbit follows the quest of a home-loving hobbit, a fictional, diminutive humanoid, to win a share of the treasure guarded by the dragon, Smaug.

Sheeran has a lifelong devotion to the novel of Tolkien; his grandfather owns a first edition copy; it was the first book Sheeran's father read to him as a child, and the first book that Sheeran read himself. On 5 November 2013, Sheeran announced his involvement in the soundtrack in a series of online posts, which included his thanking Jackson for the opportunity. He is also a fan of Jackson's films.

Jackson was introduced to Sheeran's music by his daughter, Katie, who attended Sheeran's concert in Wellington, New Zealand, in March 2013. Jackson, having learned Sheeran's regard toward his films, met him over lunch the following day where they exchanged email addresses.

In late 2013, Jackson and Fran Walsh, who co-produced and co-wrote the film, were searching for an artist who would write and record the song. Following Katie's advice, they decided to tap Sheeran. Jackson sent a message to Sheeran, who was in the Mediterranean island of Ibiza attending a wedding ceremony, asking if he would be interested in the project, which Sheeran accepted. Departing from London, Sheeran and his manager, Stuart, arrived in Wellington within 48 hours.

== Writing and production ==
Park Road Post, a film post-production facility located in Wellington, New Zealand, where Sheeran wrote and produced "I See Fire".

Sheeran watched the film at an early screening in Park Road Post, a film post-production facility located in Wellington, New Zealand. Jackson advised Sheeran to focus on the film's ending: "Focus on the last 10 minutes. That's what the song needs to reflect[. ...] Write a song that takes the audience by the hand and leads them from Middle-earth back into reality." Capturing his reaction to watching the film, Sheeran immediately began writing the lyrics "from the perspective of being a dwarf". Jackson required a folk song and Sheeran, who is "known for songs that wouldn't fit in a Hobbit film", attempted to follow in that direction.

Sheeran wrote and recorded, in only one day, most of the elements present in the released version. Further revisions were made in a course of three days that Sheeran stayed in the facility. Sheeran revealed he was given complete freedom in the creative process, while receiving ready inputs from Jackson and his co-filmmakers. In particular, Sheeran notes: "[Jackson] knows the colors and templates of what the song should be rather than how the melody should go."

Sheeran also produced the song, playing all the instruments except for the cello. Despite having never played the violin, he chose to perform it himself through overdubbing. Flight of the Conchords' touring cellist Nigel Collins added cello parts as dictated by Sheeran. Pete Cobbin of Abbey Road Studios mixed "I See Fire"; Cobbin was at Park Road Post at the same time, responsible for mixing the musical score of The Desolation of Smaug.

"I See Fire" is a folk ballad, characterized with gently strummed acoustic guitar. Sheeran revealed he took inspiration from the 1970s Irish folk band Planxty. According to Entertainment Weekly's Jodi Walker, the song is "touch reminiscent" of "The Parting Glass", an Irish traditional song that is a bonus track in Sheeran's debut album, +. The themes in The Hobbit are present in the song's lyrics, which refer to "fire, mountains and brotherhood".

== Single and video release ==
"I See Fire" was released on 5 November 2013 through iTunes, initially in the United States and then worldwide within the next 36 hours. It was later released on 10 December 2013 as part of the film's soundtrack, The Hobbit: The Desolation of Smaug, through WaterTower Music and Decca Records. Sheeran released "I See Fire" while on tour in support of his debut album; it was the first solo record that he released, two years since his last. Initially, the track was announced as a non-inclusion in his next album, subsequently titled x. However, it appeared on the deluxe edition of that album. Sheeran announced the inclusion on 9 April 2014.

The official music video for "I See Fire" directed by Shane Ramirez premiered on 5 November 2013, along with the release of the song. The video shows Sheeran performing and recording the vocals, the songwriting and recording of live instruments, behind the scenes, all throughout interspersed with shots from the film. The footage which shows Sheeran performing and recording the song is shot in black-and-white, while the rest shown in full color. The video, which is uploaded in the Warner Bros. Pictures channel in YouTube, had accumulated over 114 million views as of December 2021, making it the most popular video on their channel.

== Critical reception ==
"I See Fire" attracted critical commentaries. In his review of the single, Nick Catucci of the Entertainment Weekly stated that although looming in the song is a "flame-broiled disaster", Sheeran "keeps his strumming cool, and a hopeful flame burning for Bilbo". For Rolling Stone, Ryan Reed wrote: "The haunting track is right in line with Sheeran's trademark style, filled with dramatic crooning and quiet acoustic guitars." Delia Paunescu of Vulture.com found "I See Fire" "so calming it may put you to sleep".

=== Accolades ===
In December 2013, Sheeran said he would be promoting the song until end of the awards season, in his bid to bagging a nomination at the 2014 Academy Awards (although it was not nominated). "I See Fire" was nominated for Best Original Song at the 2014 Satellite Awards. It also received nomination for Best Song Written for Visual Media from the 2015 Grammy Award.

== Chart performance ==
Since its release on 5 November 2013, "I See Fire" has been listed for 727 weeks in 19 different charts. Its first appearance was on 7 November in the Ireland Singles Top 100, where it debuted at number 22. The song was successful in many European countries, with a peak position of number 1 in Norway and Sweden. In Sheeran's home country, the single peaked at number 13 on the UK Singles Chart, spending 65 weeks on the chart. The British Phonographic Industry certified the single silver on 26 December 2014, denoting sales of 400,000 units.

"I See Fire" was well received in Oceania. In New Zealand, single peaked at number 1 for three weeks. It was certified triple platinum by the Recorded Music NZ, denoting sales of 45,000 copies. "I See Fire" is the 6th top-selling single in New Zealand in 2014. In Australia, the single peaked at number 10 for 3 non-consecutive weeks. It has been certified two-time platinum by the Australian Recording Industry Association, denoting sales of 140,000 copies as of 2014. In Australia's 2014 year-end chart, "I See Fire" was ranked at number 78.

According to commercial streaming company Spotify, "I See Fire" was the most streamed song from a soundtrack between 2013 and 2014, outperforming other popular contemporaries. In April 2015, Spotify released a report of the most streamed tracks worldwide under the category sleep. "I See Fire" was placed at number 4, joining Sheeran's other 6 songs ranked in the top 20. Sleep is one of Spotify's most popular categories "that people also use for general relaxation and to help themselves unwind". The Guardian columnist Tim Dowling suggests that the report is an indication of "very popular, slightly mellow songs that keep cropping up on sleep playlists" but not a list of a "carefully curated journey to unconsciousness".

== Cover versions ==
The American singer-songwriter Peter Hollens recorded a version of the song. Hollens had previously recorded "Misty Mountain" off the soundtrack for the first installment of The Hobbit series. His version of "I See Fire" features "98 different sound tracks" layered onto "8–14 vocal parts" that Hollens recorded.

The Norwegian DJ and record producer Kygo released a remixed version of the song which became popular. Kygo's success is attributed largely to the reception of his remixed version of "I See Fire". Less than two years later, the remix had been played 26 million times on SoundCloud. As of March 2025, the version has been played over 80 million times on SoundCloud.

The New Zealand musical trio Sol3 Mio released a cover version of "I See Fire" in support of New Zealand's participation at the 2015 Rugby World Cup.

German band Axel Rudi Pell released a cover in 2017 on their album The Ballads V.

German band Feuerschwanz released a Folk Metal cover of the song in 2020.

== Credits and personnel ==
- Ed Sheeran – lead and backing vocals, acoustic guitar, piano, violin, bass guitar, percussion, producer, mixing
- Nigel Collins – cello
- Stephen Gallagher – engineer
- Graham Kennedy – engineer
- Pete Cobbin – mixing
- Kirsty Whalley – mixing
- Miles Showell – mastered

== Charts ==
=== Weekly charts ===
Chart (2013–15)	Peak position
Australia (ARIA)	10
Austria (Ö3 Austria Top 40)	3
Belgium (Ultratop 50 Flanders)	6
Belgium (Ultratop 50 Wallonia)	50
Canada Hot 100 (Billboard)	21
Czech Republic Airplay (ČNS IFPI)	17
Czech Republic Singles Digital (ČNS IFPI)	35
Denmark (Tracklisten)	3
Euro Digital Songs (Billboard)	7
Finland (Suomen virallinen lista)	5
France (SNEP)	72
Germany (GfK)	2
Hungary (Single Top 40)	9
Hungary (Stream Top 40)	36
Iceland (RÚV)	5
Ireland (IRMA)	8
Luxembourg Digital Songs (Billboard)	2
Netherlands (Dutch Top 40)	13
Netherlands (Single Top 100)	10
New Zealand (Recorded Music NZ)	1
Norway (VG-lista)	1
Poland Airplay (ZPAV)	2
Romania Airplay (Media Forest)	1
Scottish Singles Sales (Official Charts)	12
Slovakia Airplay (ČNS IFPI)	10
Slovakia Singles Digital (ČNS IFPI)	20
South Korea International (Circle)	69
Spain (Promusicae)	47
Sweden (Sverigetopplistan)	1
Switzerland (Schweizer Hitparade)	2
UK Singles (Official Charts)	13
US Bubbling Under Hot 100 (Billboard)	1
US Digital Song Sales (Billboard)	36
US Hot Rock & Alternative Songs (Billboard)	15

=== Year-end charts ===
Chart (2013)	Position
Netherlands (Dutch Top 40)	134
New Zealand (Recorded Music NZ)	45
Chart (2014)	Position
Australia (ARIA)	78
Austria (Ö3 Austria Top 40)	5
Belgium (Ultratop 50 Flanders)	29
Denmark (Tracklisten)	5
France (SNEP)	194
Germany (Official German Charts)	8
Hungary (Single Top 40)	97
Netherlands (Dutch Top 40)	42
Netherlands (Single Top 100)	20
New Zealand (Recorded Music NZ)	6
Poland (Polish Airplay Top 100)	2
Sweden (Sverigetopplistan)	2
Switzerland (Schweizer Hitparade)	3
UK Singles (Official Charts Company)	71
US Hot Rock Songs (Billboard)	90
Chart (2015)	Position
Denmark (Tracklisten)	59
Netherlands (Single Top 100)	82
Sweden (Sverigetopplistan)	81

=== Decade-end charts ===
Chart (2010–2019)	Position
Germany (Official German Charts)	15

== Certifications ==
Region	Certification	Certified units/sales
Australia (ARIA)	2× Platinum	140,000^{^}
Austria (IFPI Austria)	3× Platinum	90,000^{*}
Belgium (BRMA)	Platinum	20,000^{‡}
Brazil (Pro-Música Brasil)	Platinum	60,000^{‡}
Canada (Music Canada)	3× Platinum	240,000^{‡}
Denmark (IFPI Danmark)	5× Platinum	450,000^{‡}
Germany (BVMI)	4× Platinum	1,200,000^{‡}
Italy (FIMI)	2× Platinum	100,000^{‡}
New Zealand (RMNZ)	6× Platinum	180,000^{‡}
Spain (Promusicae)	Platinum	60,000^{‡}
Sweden (GLF)	4× Platinum	160,000^{‡}
United Kingdom (BPI)	2× Platinum	1,200,000^{‡}
United States (RIAA)	Platinum	1,000,000^{‡}
Streaming
Denmark (IFPI Danmark)	4× Platinum	10,400,000^{†}
^{*} Sales figures based on certification alone.^{^} Shipments figures based on certification alone.^{‡} Sales+streaming figures based on certification alone.^{†} Streaming-only figures based on certification alone.

== Release history ==
Region	Date	Format	Label
Various	5 November 2013	Digital download	WaterTower; Decca

== See also ==
- Destiny (Celtic Woman album), track 7
