= Gimli (Middle-earth) =

Fictional Dwarf in The Lord of the Rings

Gimli son of Glóin
- Middle-earth character

In-universe information
- Aliases: Elf-friend; Lockbearer; Lord of the Glittering Caves
- Race: Dwarf
- Affiliation: Company of the Ring
- Books: The Fellowship of the Ring (1954); The Two Towers (1955); The Return of the King (1956); Unfinished Tales (1980)

Gimli is a fictional character in J. R. R. Tolkien's Middle-earth, appearing in The Lord of the Rings. A dwarf warrior, he is the son of Glóin, a member of Thorin's company in Tolkien's earlier book The Hobbit. He represents the race of Dwarves as a member of the Fellowship of the Ring. As such, he is one of the primary characters in the story. In the course of the adventure, Gimli aids the Ring-bearer Frodo Baggins, participates in the War of the Ring, and becomes close friends with Legolas, overcoming an ancient enmity of Dwarves and Elves.

Scholars have commented that Gimli is unlike other dwarves in being free from their characteristic greed for gold. They note, too, that he is unique in being granted the gift of Galadriel's hair, something that she had refused to Fëanor. The events recall the Norse legend Njáls saga, where a gift of hair is refused, with fateful consequences.

Gimli was voiced by David Buck in Ralph Bakshi's 1978 animated version of The Lord of the Rings. Gimli does not appear in Rankin/Bass's 1980 animated version of The Return of the King. In Peter Jackson's film trilogy, Gimli is played by the Welsh actor John Rhys-Davies, using a Scottish accent.

== Fictional biography ==
Gimli was born in the Ered Luin in the Third Age, son of Glóin. Gimli had wanted to accompany his father on the quest to reclaim Erebor, but at age 62 he was deemed too young. (Note: Tolkien 1980, part 3 "The Third Age", ch. 3 "The Quest of Erebor") He was a remote descendant of Durin the Deathless, chief of the Seven Fathers of the Dwarves and ancestor of the Longbeards. Gimli was of the royal line, but not close to the succession; he was the third cousin once removed of Dáin II Ironfoot. (Note: Tolkien 1955, Appendix A, part 3, "Durin's Folk") (Note: Tolkien 1954a, book 2, ch. 5 "The Bridge of Khazad-dûm")

Gimli is first seen with Glóin at the Council of Elrond; they tell the Council that the Dark Lord Sauron is searching for Bilbo, and ask Elrond's advice. They learn that Frodo Baggins is now the bearer of the One Ring. The Council decides to destroy it by casting it into Mount Doom. Frodo volunteers for the task; (Note: Tolkien 1954a, book 2, ch. 2 "The Council of Elrond") Gimli is among those chosen to help him. (Note: Tolkien 1954a, book 2, ch. 3 "The Ring Goes South") There is friction between Gimli and the elf Legolas as their races bear an old grudge against each other. (Note: Tolkien 1954a, book 2, ch. 4 "A Journey in the Dark")

When the company is forced to enter the ancient underground Dwarf-realm, the Mines of Moria, Gimli is at first enthusiastic, hoping to find Balin there. However, Moria is still inhabited by Orcs, Cave Trolls, and a Balrog: Balin and his folk have all been killed. The Fellowship finds his tomb in the Chamber of Mazarbul; Orcs attack, and they have to fight their way out. (Note: Tolkien 1954a, book 2, ch. 4 "A Journey in the Dark") Aragorn leads the company to Lothlórien, populated by Elves hostile to Dwarves. Gimli refuses to be blindfolded, risking a conflict, so Aragorn has the entire Fellowship blindfolded. (Note: Tolkien 1954a, book 2, ch. 6 "Lothlórien")

Gimli's opinion of Elves changes when he meets Galadriel, co-ruler of Lothlórien: her beauty, kindness, and understanding impress him so much that, when given the opportunity to ask for whatever he wishes, he responds that being able to see her and hear her gentle words is gift enough. When pressed, he admits that he desires a single strand of her golden hair, to be an heirloom of his house, but that he could not ask for such a gift. Galadriel is so moved by his bold yet courteous request that she gives him not one, but three of her hairs. (Note: A similar request had been made, thousands of years previously, by Galadriel's uncle Fëanor, greatest of the Noldorin Elves (whose creation of the Silmarils may have been inspired by that same silver-gold hair). Galadriel refused Fëanor's request, but she grants Gimli's, perhaps because of his humility. (Note: Tolkien 1980, part 2, ch. 4 "The History of Galadriel and Celeborn")) Gimli's gesture of respect and humility towards Galadriel changes Legolas' opinion of him, and they become firm friends. (Note: Tolkien 1954a, book 2, ch. 8 "Farewell to Lórien")

At Amon Hen, the company is divided, and Gimli joins Legolas and Aragorn in pursuing Merry and Pippin who have been captured by Orcs. (Note: Tolkien 1954, book 3, ch. 1 "The Departure of Boromir") After running many miles in a few days to the land of Rohan, they meet Éomer, nephew of Rohan's King Théoden, with a troop of cavalry, which has killed all the Orcs. When Éomer speaks badly of the name Galadriel, Gimli responds harshly, but Aragorn prevents a fight. (Note: Tolkien 1954, book 3, ch. 2 "The Riders of Rohan") Gandalf leads them to Rohan's capital, Edoras, where he rouses Théoden to war against Saruman. (Note: Tolkien 1954, book 3, ch. 6 "The King of the Golden Hall") Gimli proves his valour in combat in the Battle of Helm's Deep. He and Legolas engage in an Orc-slaying contest (Gimli wins by one; he kills 42 to Legolas's 41). Gimli saves Éomer's life by killing two orcs and driving off two others. (Note: Tolkien 1954, book 3, ch. 7 "Helm's Deep") Later, Gimli's vivid description of the Glittering Caves of Aglarond moves Legolas to promise to visit the caves when the War is over; (Note: Tolkien 1954, book 3, ch. 8 "The Road to Isengard") and eventually they make the visit together. (Note: Tolkien 1955, book 6, ch. 6 "Many Partings") After the battle, Gimli witnesses Gandalf casting Saruman out of the Order of Wizards; he sees through Saruman's lies with the words "This wizard's words stand on their heads". (Note: Tolkien 1954, book 3, ch. 10 "The Voice of Saruman")

Gimli accompanies Aragorn on the Paths of the Dead, (Note: Tolkien 1955, book 5, ch. 2 "The Passing of the Grey Company") and the battles at Pelargir and the Pelennor Fields. (Note: Tolkien 1955, book 5, ch. 6 "The Battle of the Pelennor Fields") He takes part in the final battle against Sauron, the Battle of the Morannon in front of the Black Gate. There he recognizes Pippin Took's feet underneath a fallen troll, saving his life. (Note: Tolkien 1955, book 5, ch. 10 "The Black Gate Opens") (Note: Tolkien 1955, book 6, ch. 4 "The Field of Cormallen")

After the destruction of the Ring, Gimli leads many Dwarves south to Aglarond, becoming the first Lord of the Glittering Caves. They build "great works" in Rohan and Gondor, and replace the ruined gate of Minas Tirith with one made of mithril and steel. (Note: Tolkien 1955, Appendix A, part 3.) After Aragorn's death, Gimli (then 262 years old) sails with Legolas into the West, becoming the first Dwarf in the Undying Lands. (Note: Tolkien 1955, Appendix B, "Later Events Concerning the Members of the Fellowship of the Ring")

== Family tree ==
Durin's Folk, showing the Dwarvish tendency to have few children (and fewer daughters) (Note: Names in italics in the family tree are Thorin and his company from The Hobbit.)

Durin I	Dwarves of Moria
Durin VI
Náin I
Thráin I
Thorin I
Glóin
Óin
Náin II
Dáin I	Borin
Frór	Thrór	Grór	Farin
Thráin II	Náin	Fundin	Gróin
Dís (♀)	Thorin II; Oakenshield	Dáin II; Ironfoot	Dwalin, Balin	Glóin	Óin	Ori, Dori, Nori	Bifur, Bofur, Bombur
Fili, Kili	Thorin III; Stonehelm	Gimli
Durin VII

== Concept and creation ==
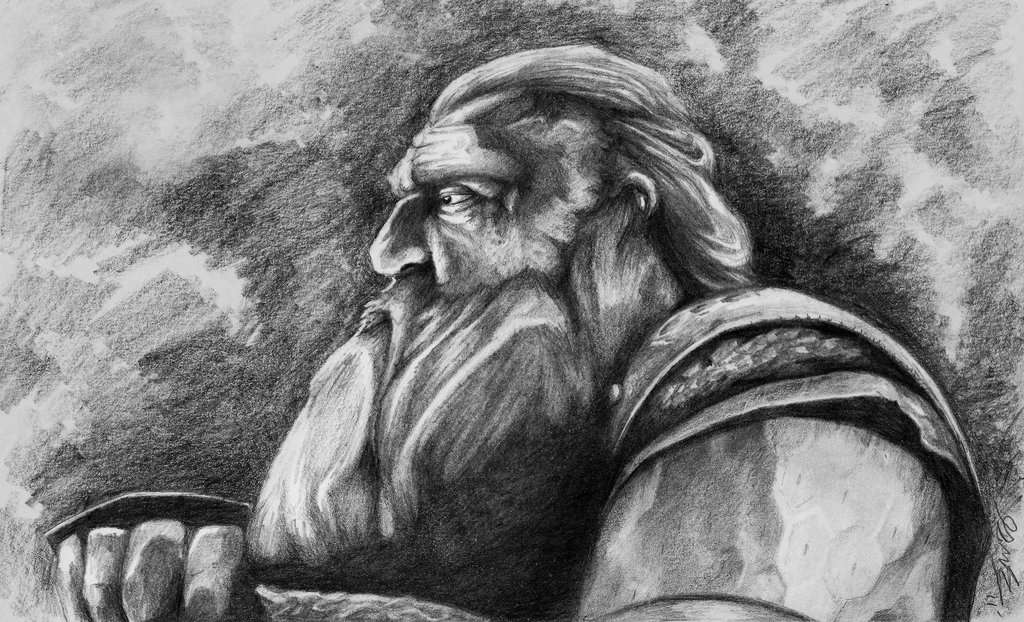
Fan art of "Gimli son of Glóin". Dimitra Fimi notes the small leap required for fan activity to switch from book-based to film-based.

The name Gimli first appeared in Tolkien's works in "The Tale of Tinúviel", the earliest version of the story of Beren and Lúthien Tinúviel, found in the second volume of The Book of Lost Tales. Here, the name belongs to an aged elf, a prisoner along with Beren in the kitchens of Tevildo, Prince of Cats (forerunner of Sauron). (Note: Tolkien 1984b, volume 2, ch. 1 "The Tale of Tinúviel".) During the writing of The Lord of the Rings, as told in The Return of the Shadow, Gimli's character was first named Frar, then Burin, and he was the son of Balin. (Note: Tolkien 1988, [part 4] "The Story Continued", ch. 23 "In the House of Elrond")

== Analysis ==
The Tolkien scholar Tom Shippey writes that Tolkien has Gimli "swap grim proverbs" with Elrond. Shippey comments that dwarvish heroism is expressed in their veiled speech, as seen also with King Dáin's stubborn replies to the messenger of Mordor. He sees these examples as unified by "delight in the contrast between passionate interior and polite or rational expression; the weakness of the latter is an index of the strength of the former".

Writing in Mallorn, the journal of the Tolkien Society, Lilian Darvell states that Gimli's request for a gift of Galadriel's hair is to be contrasted with Fëanor's earlier request of the same gift, described in "The History of Galadriel and Celeborn", in Unfinished Tales. (Note: Tolkien 1980, "The History of Galadriel and Celeborn".) Galadriel rejected Fëanor's request, though he made it three times. Darvell comments that given Galadriel's ability to see into people's hearts, and the darkness she saw in Fëanor, she must have seen something better in Gimli than in "one of the greatest of the Noldor". Darvell notes that the gift of hair has echoes in both literature, as in Berenice and the Lock by Callimachus and Catullus and The Rape of the Lock by Alexander Pope, and in Norse legend. In Njáls saga, Gunnarr's bowstring breaks in a desperate battle; he asks his wife Hallgerðr for two hairs to use as a replacement, but she refuses because he had once struck her, and he is killed. Darvell comments that Galadriel's refusal does not kill Fëanor, but it does result in a distancing, which might have led him to refuse to send ships to rescue her from Númenor.

The scholars of international relations Abigail Ruane and Patrick James view Gimli as an exemplar of "neoliberal institutionalists" within the economy of Middle-earth, since his "people avidly pursue gold and treasure". In their view, he and his Dwarves also illustrate the interdependence of nations through their networks of trade and allies; the varied "relationships among Dwarves, Elves, and Men provide a foundation upon which to build and [to] ally against Sauron and illustrate how complex interdependence can reduce perceptions of insecurity and create opportunities for cooperation rather than conflict."

The Tolkien scholar John Miller writes that like the Elves, the Dwarves have withdrawn from history and become subject to "an increased aesthetic sensibility", exemplified by Gimli's lyrical description of the Glittering Caves of Aglarond. Miller argues that as well as praising the beauty of the caves, Gimli's account "emphasizes their stillness, their abstraction from the history marching along outside". He suggests that the dwarvish love of hand-crafted workmanship could be a pre-modern aesthetic, an immature or adolescent appreciation compared to that of Elves or Men.

The philologist Susan Robbins writes in Žmogus ir žodis that with the words "I say to you, Gimli son of Glóin, that your hands shall flow with gold, yet over you gold shall have no dominion", Galadriel gives Gimli, alone of all the Dwarves, immunity to the dragon-sickness. Robbins defines this as "bewilderment or confusion that makes one so greedy for ... gold that one would rather starve to death [for] rather than give any of it up", the fate that overwhelmed the Dwarf Thorin Oakenshield and the human Master of Laketown in The Hobbit. She notes that Tolkien stated that the dragon-sickness, the effect of the magic spells placed on Smaug's golden hoard, had been derived from line 3052 of the Old English poem Beowulf: iúmonna gold galdre bewunden, "the gold of men of long ago enmeshed in enchantment".

== Adaptations ==
Gimli in Ralph Bakshi's animated version of The Lord of the Rings

Gimli was voiced by David Buck in Ralph Bakshi's 1978 animated version of The Lord of the Rings. Here he is drawn as being almost as tall as the rest of the non-hobbit members of the Fellowship. Gimli does not appear in Rankin/Bass's 1980 animated version of The Return of the King. He is portrayed by Tomi Salmela-Nikunen in the 1993 Finnish miniseries Hobitit.

John Rhys-Davies as Gimli in Peter Jackson's The Lord of the Rings: The Fellowship of the Ring

In Peter Jackson's film trilogy, Gimli is played by the Welsh actor John Rhys-Davies. Brian Sibley has asserted that Rhys-Davies used "his distinctive Welsh-derived accent" for the character. Several other sources state, however, that Rhys-Davies uses a Scottish accent; the Scottish The Press and Journal praises him for the "convincing" Scottish accent, calling his performance "raspy, croaky, bearded and brilliant". Rhys-Davies himself states on The Fellowship of the Ring extended version DVD that the accent was by intention Scottish, and that it had been his decision to use it. The New Zealand Herald quotes Rhys-Davies as saying of Gimli that "There is a gritty sort of fierce belligerence, and in the end I thought an almost Glasgow Scottish accent would serve the character."

In Peter Jackson's films, Gimli's prosaic and blunt style, contrasting with the refined Aragorn and Legolas, provides defusing comic relief, with much of the humour based on his height, along with his competitive, if friendly, feud with Legolas, where Gimli consistently finds himself out-achieved.

Gimli was portrayed by Ross Williams in the 3-hour Toronto stage production of The Lord of the Rings, which opened in 2006. In The Lord of the Rings: The Musical, he was played by Sévan Stephan throughout its London run.

The classical composer Craig H. Russell's 1995 Middle Earth has as its second movement "Gimli, the Dwarf"; Russell describes it as sounding "like a rugged Irish tune". The piece was originally written for string ensemble, and re-orchestrated for symphonic orchestra.
