= Forbes Fictional 15 =

Forbes list of the 15 richest fictional characters

The Forbes Fictional 15 was a list from Forbes business magazine that listed the 15 richest people in the realm of fiction produced between 2002 and 2013. The members are characters from movies, books, cartoons, television, video games, and comics.

To qualify for the list, candidates needed to be "both fictional (in the sense that mythological and folkloric figures were excluded) and characters (meaning they were part of a narrative story or series of stories)," in addition to being wealthy. The one exception to the rule was Santa Claus, a character whom Forbes decided was an "irresistible" addition, although he was absent from the list since 2006. Forbes stated, "We still estimate Claus's net worth as infinite, but we excluded him from this year's rankings after being bombarded by letters from outraged children insisting that Claus is real. We don't claim to have settled the ongoing controversy concerning Claus's existence, but after taking into account the physical evidence—toys delivered, milk and cookies devoured—we felt it was safer to remove him from consideration." After Claus was excluded, Scrooge McDuck became the wealthiest member due to being portrayed as having a tower vault full of gold. "Mom" from Futurama is the wealthiest woman on the list, with an estimated $15.7 billion.

The wealth of fictional characters under consideration for the list was calculated by combining the fictional source texts with real-world information about stock and commodity prices. As wealthy as the fictional characters on the list have been, their wealth has historically been exceeded by that of real-world billionaires such as Bill Gates and Carlos Slim.

== See also ==
- Forbes 400
