= Smaug =

Dragon in J. R. R. Tolkien's 'The Hobbit'

- Middle-earth character
- Tolkien's illustration Conversation with Smaug

In-universe information
- Species: Dragon
- Gender: Male
- Book(s): The Hobbit; The Return of the King; Unfinished Tales

Smaug (/smaʊɡ/ (Note: Tolkien 1996, "The Appendix on Languages")) is a dragon and the main antagonist in J. R. R. Tolkien's 1937 novel The Hobbit, his treasure and the mountain he lives in being the goal of the quest. Powerful and fearsome, he invaded the Dwarf kingdom of Erebor 171 years prior to the events described in the novel. A group of thirteen dwarves mounted a quest to take the kingdom back, aided by the wizard Gandalf and the hobbit Bilbo Baggins. In The Hobbit, Thorin describes Smaug as "a most specially greedy, strong and wicked worm". (Note: Tolkien 1937, Chapter 1: An Unexpected Party)

Critics have identified close parallels with what they presume are sources of Tolkien's inspiration, including the dragon in Beowulf, who is provoked by the stealing of a precious cup, and the speaking dragon Fafnir, who proposes a betrayal to Sigurd. A further source may be Henry Wadsworth Longfellow's 1855 poem The Song of Hiawatha, where Megissogwon, the spirit of wealth, is protected by an armoured shirt, but whose one weak spot is revealed by a talking bird. Commentators have noted Smaug's devious, vain, and proud character, and his aggressively polite way of speaking, like the British upper class.

Smaug was voiced and interpreted with performance capture by Benedict Cumberbatch in Peter Jackson's film adaptations of The Hobbit.

== Description ==
Dragons lived in the Withered Heath beyond the Grey Mountains. Smaug was "the greatest of the dragons of his day", already centuries old at the time he was first recorded. He heard rumours of the great wealth of the Dwarf-kingdom of Erebor, which had a prosperous trade with the Northmen of Dale. Smaug "arose and without warning came against King Thrór and descended on the mountain in flames". After driving the Dwarves out of their stronghold, Smaug occupied the interior of the mountain for the next 150 years, guarding a vast hoard of treasure. He destroyed the town of Dale; the Men retreated to the Long Lake, where they built Lake-town of houses on stilts, surrounded by water to guard against the dragon. (Note: Tolkien 1955, Appendix A:III "Durin's Folk")

'The King under the Mountain is dead and where are his kin that dare seek revenge? Girion Lord of Dale is dead, and I have eaten his people like a wolf among sheep, and where are his sons' sons that dare approach me? I kill where I wish and none dare resist. I laid low the warriors of old and their like is not in the world today. Then I was but young and tender. Now I am old and strong, strong, strong, Thief in the Shadows!' he gloated. 'My armour is like tenfold shields, my teeth are swords, my claws spears, the shock of my tail a thunderbolt, my wings a hurricane, and my breath death!'

— J. R. R. Tolkien, The Hobbit

Gandalf realized that Smaug could pose a serious threat if allied to Sauron. He therefore agreed to assist a party of Dwarves, led by Thrór's grandson Thorin Oakenshield, who set out to recapture the mountain and kill the dragon. Assuming that Smaug would not recognize the scent of a Hobbit, Gandalf recruited Bilbo Baggins to join the quest as a burglar. (Note: Tolkien 1980, Part III, Chapter 3: The Quest of Erebor)

Upon reaching Erebor, the Dwarves sent Bilbo into Smaug's lair, and he was initially successful in stealing a beautiful golden cup as Smaug slept. Knowing the contents of the treasure hoard to the ounce, Smaug quickly realized the cup's absence upon awakening and searched for the thief on the Mountain. Unsuccessful, he returned to his hoard to lie in wait. The Dwarves sent Bilbo down the secret tunnel a second time. Smaug sensed through smell and sound Bilbo's presence immediately, even though Bilbo had rendered himself invisible with the One Ring, and accused the Hobbit (correctly) of trying to steal from him. During his discourse with the dragon, Bilbo noticed a small bare patch on Smaug's jewel-encrusted underbelly, and narrowly escaped; however, he accidentally revealed that the Lake-Men had aided in the quest. A thrush overheard Bilbo's account of the meeting, and learnt of the bare patch on Smaug's underside. (Note: Tolkien 1937, Chapter 12: Inside Information)

Still enraged, Smaug flew south to Lake-town and set about destroying it. The townsmen's arrows and spears proved useless against the dragon's armoured body. The thrush told Bard the Bowman of Smaug's one weak spot, a bare patch on the dragon's belly. With his last arrow, Bard killed Smaug by shooting into this place. (Note: Tolkien 1937, Chapter 14: Fire and Water)

== Analysis ==
The dragon stopped short in his boasting. 'Your information is antiquated', he snapped. 'I am armoured above and below with iron scales and hard gems. No blade can pierce me.'

'I might have guessed it', said Bilbo. 'Truly there can nowhere be found the equal of Lord Smaug the Impenetrable. What magnificence to possess a waistcoat of fine diamonds!'

'Yes, it is rare and wonderful, indeed', said Smaug absurdly pleased. He did not know that the hobbit had already caught a glimpse of his peculiar under-covering on his previous visit, and was itching for a closer view for reasons of his own. The dragon rolled over. 'Look!' he said. 'What do you say to that?'

'Dazzlingly marvellous! Perfect! Flawless! Staggering!' exclaimed Bilbo aloud, but what he thought inside was: 'Old fool! Why, there is a large patch in the hollow of his left breast as bare as a snail out of its shell!'

— J.R.R. Tolkien, The Hobbit

=== Character ===
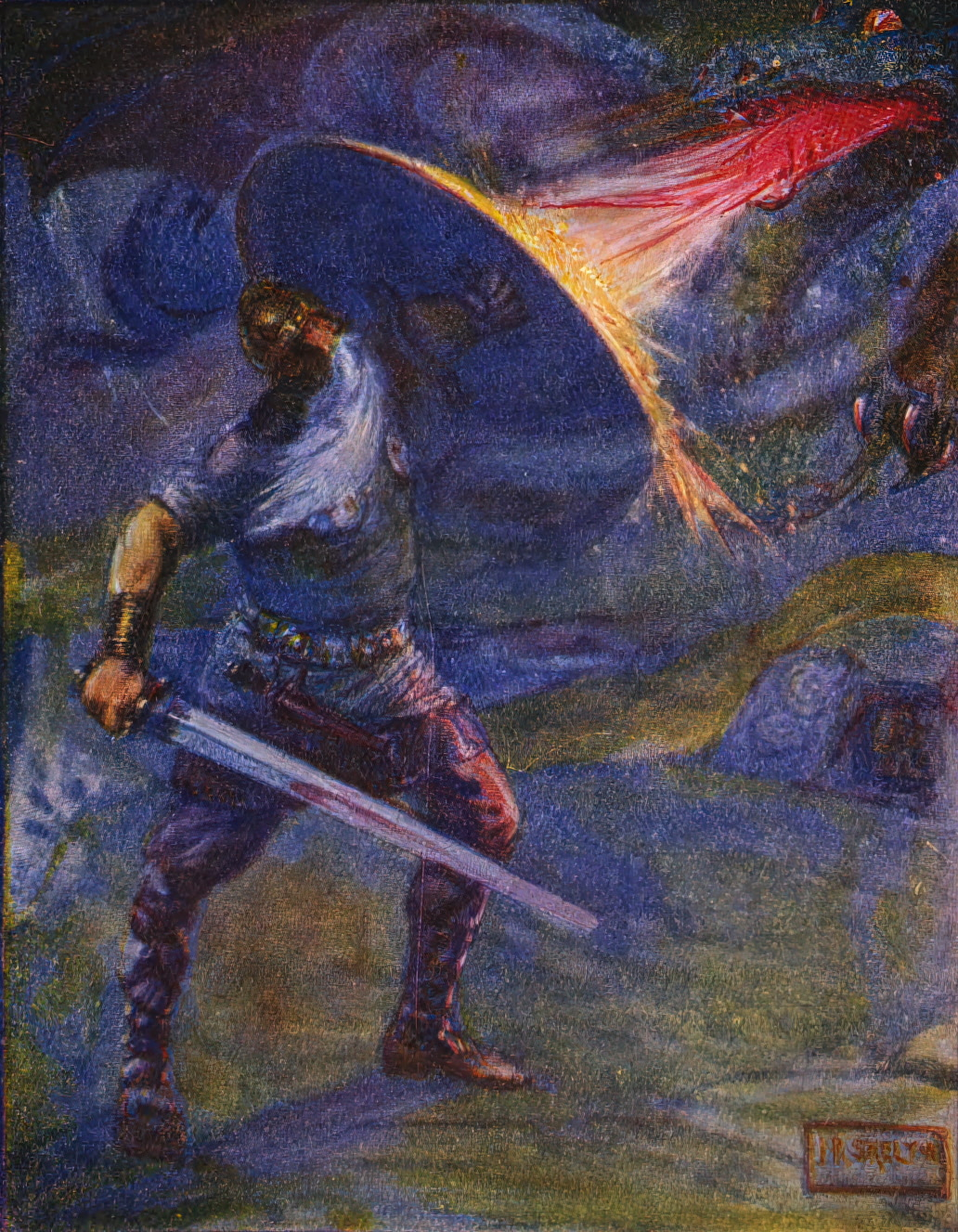
Beowulf fights his dragon to the death in a 1908 illustration by Joseph Ratcliffe Skelton.

Tolkien made Smaug "more villain than monster", writes the author and biographer Lynnette Porter; he is "devious and clever, vain and greedy, overly confident and proud." The fantasy author Sandra Unerman called Smaug "one of the most individual dragons in fiction". The Tolkien scholar Anne Petty said that "it was love at first sight", describing Smaug as "frightening, but surprisingly knowable".

The Tolkien scholar Tom Shippey notes the "bewilderment" that Smaug spreads: he is enchanted by gold and treasure, and those who come into contact with his powerful presence, what Tolkien describes as "the effect that dragon-talk has on the inexperienced", similarly become bewildered by greed. In Shippey's view, however, the most surprising aspect of Smaug's character is "his oddly circumlocutory mode of speech. He speaks in fact with the characteristic aggressive politeness of the British upper class, in which irritation and authority are in direct proportion to apparent deference or uncertainty." In sharp contrast to this is his vanity in response to flattery, rolling over "absurdly pleased" as Tolkien narrates, to reveal his marvellously armoured belly. Shippey comments that such paradoxes, "the oscillations between animal and intelligent behaviour, the contrast between creaking politeness and plain gloating over murder" join to create Smaug's principal attribute, "wiliness".

The Christian commentator Joseph Pearce describes Smaug's weak spot as his Achilles heel, noting his boastful over-confidence in his own indestructibility, and seeing in the fact that the vulnerability is over his heart a sign that "it is the wickedness of his heart which will lead to his downfall". Pearce likens Smaug's pride to that of Achilles, whose pride leads to the death of his best friend, and of many Greeks; and to the cockerel Chauntecleer in Geoffrey Chaucer's "The Nun's Priest's Tale", where a boastful reply to the flattering fox causes the cockerel's fall.

=== The Beowulf dragon ===
From 1925 to 1945, Tolkien was a professor of English Literature at Oxford University. He was a prominent scholar of the Old English poem Beowulf, on which he gave a lecture at the British Academy in 1936. He described the poem as one of his "most valued sources" for The Hobbit. Many of Smaug's attributes and behaviour in The Hobbit derive directly from the unnamed "old night-ravager" in Beowulf: great age; winged, fiery, and reptilian (Note: The Old English word wyrm, used repeatedly in Beowulf for the flying dragon, has the dictionary meaning of reptile, serpent, or dragon. Tolkien accordingly uses "worm" of Smaug in The Hobbit. (Note: Tolkien 1937, chapter 1: An Unexpected Party)) form; a stolen barrow within which he lies on his hoard; disturbance by a theft; and violent revenge on the lands all about, flying and attacking at night.

The scholars of English literature Stuart D. Lee and Elizabeth Solopova analyse the parallels between Smaug and the unnamed Beowulf dragon.

Lee and Solopova's comparison of Smaug and the Beowulf dragon
Plot element	Beowulf	The Hobbit
Aggressive dragon	eald uhtsceaða ... hat ond hreohmod ... Wæs þæs wyrmes wig / wide gesyne "old twilight-ravager ... hot and fierce-minded" ... "that worm's war was / widely seen"	Smaug fiercely attacks Dwarves, Lake-town
Gold-greedy dragon	hordweard "treasure-guardian"	Smaug watchfully sleeps on pile of treasure
Provoking the dragon	wæs ða gebolgen / beorges hyrde, wolde se laða / lige forgyldan drincfæt dyre. "was then furious / the barrow's keeper wanted the enemy / with fire to revenge precious drinking-cup."	Smaug enraged when Bilbo steals golden cup
Night-flying dragon	nacod niðdraca, nihtes fleogeð fyre befangen "naked hate-dragon, flying by night, wreathed in fire"	Smaug attacks Lake-town with fire, by night
Well-protected dragon's lair	se ðe on heaum hofe / hord beweotode, stanbeorh steapne; stig under læg, eldum uncuð. "the one who on high heath / hoard watched steep stone-barrow / the path up to it unknown to any."	Secret passage to Smaug's lair and mound of treasure in stone palace under Mount Erebor
Accursed dragon-gold	hæðnum horde "a heathen hoard"	The treasure provokes Battle of Five Armies

=== Fafnir ===
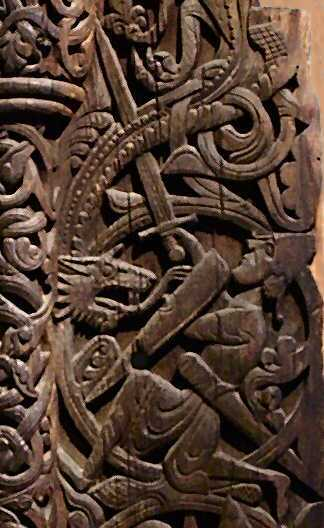
Sigurd kills the dragon Fafnir. Wood-carving in Hylestad Stave Church, 12th–13th century.

Smaug's ability to speak, the use of riddles, the element of betrayal, his enemy's communication via birds, and his weak spot could all have been inspired by the talking dragon Fafnir of the Völsunga saga. Shippey identified several points of similarity between Smaug and Fafnir.

Tom Shippey's analysis of similarities between Smaug and Fafnir
Plot element	Fáfnismál	The Hobbit
Killing the dragon	Sigurd stabs Fafnir's belly	Bard the Bowman shoots Smaug in the belly
Riddling to the dragon	Sigurd does not give his name, but replies in a riddle that he has no mother or father	Bilbo does not give his name, but gives himself riddling names like "clue-finder", "web-cutter", "barrel-rider"
Dragon suggests betrayal	Fafnir turns Sigurd against Regin	Smaug suggests Bilbo should not trust Dwarves
Talking to birds	Dragon-blood lets Sigurd understand bird language: the nuthatches say Regin wants to betray him	A thrush hears Bilbo talk about Smaug's weakness, and tells Bard the Bowman

=== The Song of Hiawatha ===
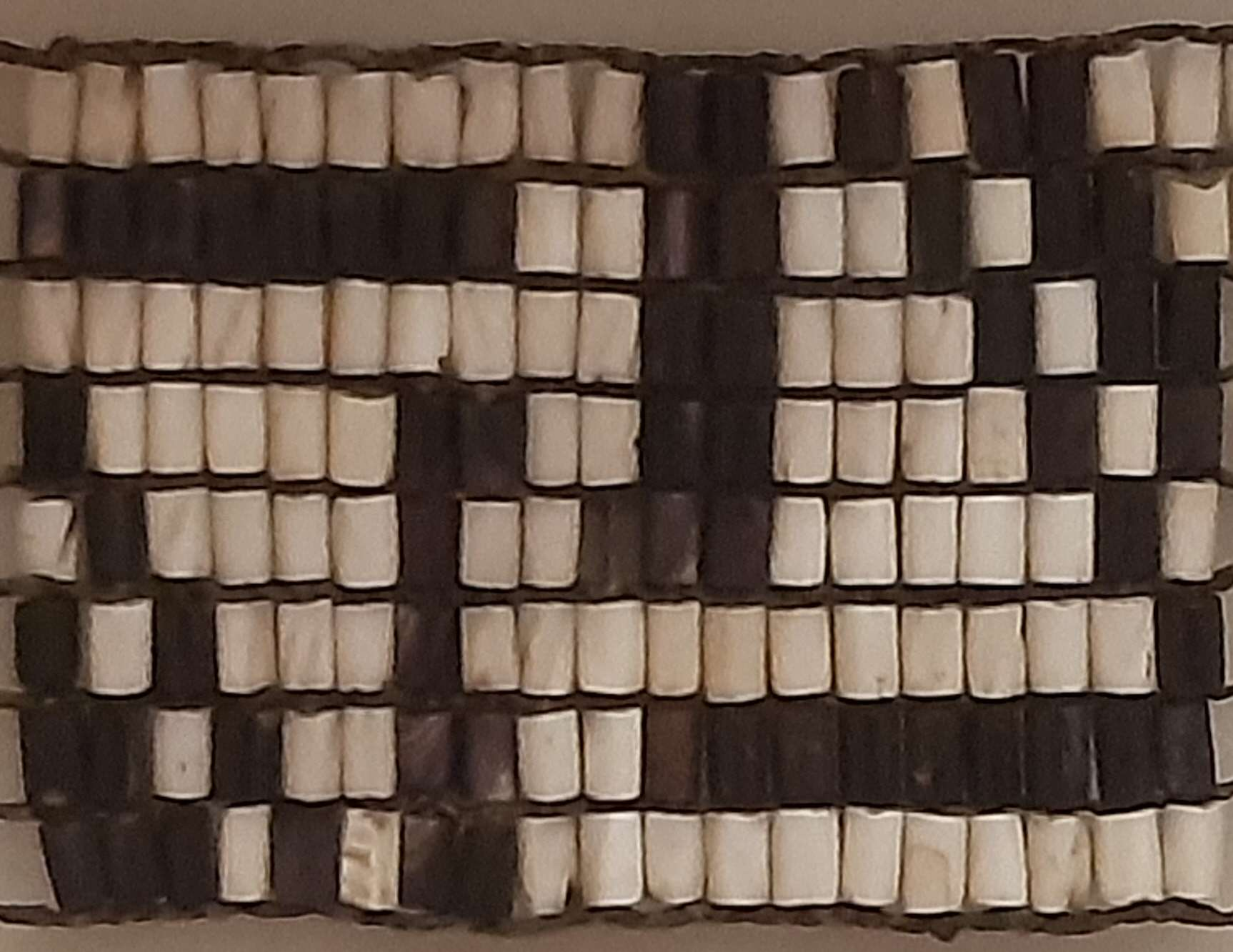
Detail of wampum bead girdle

Tolkien's biographer John Garth notes the similarity between Smaug's death from Bard's last arrow and the death of Megissogwon in Henry Wadsworth Longfellow's 1855 poem The Song of Hiawatha. Megissogwon was the spirit of wealth, protected by an armoured shirt of wampum beads. (Note: Jeff Thompson drew illustrations of Megissogwon's wampum shirt deflecting arrows for National Geographic.) Hiawatha shoots in vain, until he has only three arrows left. Mama the woodpecker sings to Hiawatha where Megissogwon's only weak point is, the tuft of hair on his head, just as Tolkien's thrush tells Bard where to shoot at Smaug.

=== Tolkien's choice of the name "Smaug" ===
In a letter published in The Observer in 1938, Tolkien wrote, "The dragon bears as name—a pseudonym—the past tense of the primitive Germanic verb smúgan, to squeeze through a hole: a low philological jest." The Tolkien scholar Tom Shippey has linked the name to the Old English word smeag (of which the Norse form would be smaug), meaning both "penetrating" and "subtle, crafty". The Old English word occurs in the 11th-century medical text Lacnunga, which includes a spell to be used wið smeogan wyrme ("against a penetrating worm"). Edward Pettit, interpreting Shippey's comments, draws an explicit link between Lacnunga and Smaug, writing, "Tolkien's knowledge of Old English charms and remedies is also shown by his use of Lacnunga's term smeah wyrm 'penetrating worm.' This contributed to his conception of Smaug in The Hobbit." Noting the dual meaning of smeag, Shippey writes, "All round it is appropriate that Smaug should have the most sophisticated intelligence in The Hobbit." He suggests that Tolkien may have chosen the Norse form of the name because his enemies were dwarves with names from the Norse Völuspá.

Old English	Old Norse	Plain meaning	Alternatively (in Smaug's case)
smugan (verb)	smjúga (verb) past tense smaug	"to creep, to squeeze through a hole"	
smeágan (verb)		"to consider, ponder, examine, inquire into, discuss, search"	(in adjectival form) "crafty, subtle"
wyrm (noun)		"worm"	"lizard, reptile, dragon"
Lacnunga, spell (on line 3) wið smeogan wyrme		[Book of] Remedies "against a penetrating worm"	In Tom Shippey's view, appropriate that Smaug has "sophisticated intelligence"; "his dominant characteristic [is] 'wiliness'"

== Illustrations ==
Tolkien created numerous pencil sketches and two pieces of more detailed artwork portraying Smaug. The latter were a detailed ink and watercolour labelled Conversation with Smaug and a rough coloured pencil and ink sketch entitled Death of Smaug. While neither of these appeared in the original printing of The Hobbit due to cost constraints, both have been included in subsequent editions, particularly Conversation with Smaug. Death of Smaug was used for the cover of a UK paperback edition of The Hobbit.

== Adaptations ==
=== Animated films ===
A somewhat cat-like Smaug as seen in the 1977 Rankin/Bass animated film of The Hobbit

A dragon named 'Slag' features in Gene Deitch's brief 1967 animated film.

Richard Boone voiced Smaug in the 1977 animated film by Rankin/Bass. Austin Gilkeson calls the film's depiction of Smaug "distinctly feline" as he has cat-like eyes and whiskers "and a lush mane". Gilkeson comments that the result does not resemble Western dragons, but that it works well, not least because Smaug's nature as an "intelligent, deadly, greedy" and lazy predator is in his view "very cat-like".

=== The Hobbit (film series) ===
Smaug as depicted in Peter Jackson's The Hobbit trilogy, with voice and motion-capture by Benedict Cumberbatch

Smaug was voiced and interpreted with performance capture by Benedict Cumberbatch in Peter Jackson's three-part adaptation of The Hobbit. From the motion capture, Smaug's design was created with key frame animation. Weta Digital employed its proprietary "Tissue" software, which was honoured in 2013 with a "Scientific and Engineering Award" from the Academy of Motion Picture Arts and Sciences to make the dragon as realistic as possible. In addition, Weta Digital supervisor Joe Letteri said in an interview for USA Today that they used classic European and Asian dragons as inspirations to create Smaug. The Telegraph stated that Cumberbatch had "the authority to make of Smaug a cunning nemesis".

In the first film, The Hobbit: An Unexpected Journey, the audience sees only his legs, wings, and tail, and his eye; the eye is showcased in the final scene of the film. Smaug is a topic of discussion among the White Council as Gandalf's reason to support Thorin Oakenshield's quest.

Smaug appears in the second film, The Hobbit: The Desolation of Smaug. In an interview with Joe Letteri, Smaug's design was changed to the wyvern-like form shown in the film after the crew saw how Benedict Cumberbatch performed Smaug while moving around on all four limbs.

In The Hobbit: The Battle of the Five Armies, Smaug attacks Lake-town. He is killed by Bard with a black arrow and his body falls on the boat carrying the fleeing Master of Lake-town. It is later revealed that Smaug's attack on Erebor was all part of Sauron's design, meaning that Smaug and Sauron were in league with each other.

Smaug was considered one of the highlights of the second film of the series; several critics hailed him as cinema's greatest dragon. Critics also praised the visual effects company Weta Digital and Cumberbatch's vocal and motion-capture performance for giving Smaug a fully realized personality, "hiss[ing] out his words with cold-blooded vitriol".

=== Other ===
In the 2014 video game Lego The Hobbit, the portrayal departs more from the book; rather than ever more closely simulating the book's characters, the scholar Carol L. Robinson notes, the technology has allowed new fiction to be created.

Francis de Wolff voiced the red dragon in the long-lost 1968 BBC radio dramatization.

The Scottish character actor Nicol Williamson voiced Smaug in the 1974 Argo Records abridged reading of The Hobbit.

== In popular culture ==
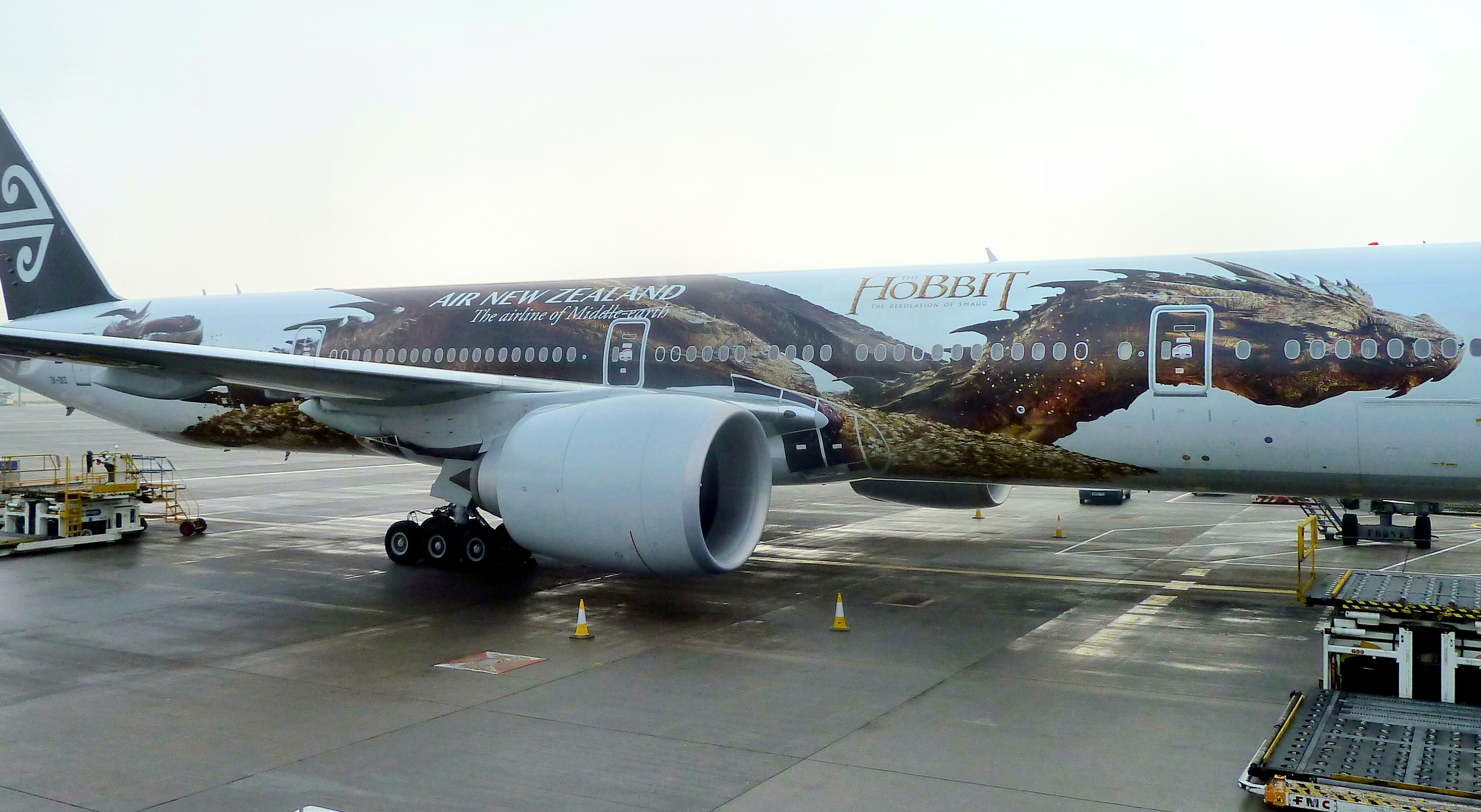
An Air New Zealand aircraft in Smaug livery

In 2012, Smaug's wealth was estimated at $61 billion, placing him in the Forbes Fictional 15.

In 2014, Wellington International Airport installed a Wētā Workshop statue of Smaug in their check-in hall to promote The Hobbit film series.

== See also ==
- Glaurung
- List of dragons
