= Gamgee =

Gamgee is a surname. Notable people with the surname include:

== People ==
- Sampson Gamgee (1828–1886), English physician
- Arthur Gamgee (1841–1909), English physiologist; son of Sampson
- John Gamgee (1831–1894), English veterinarian and inventor; developer of the Glaciarium (the first mechanically frozen ice rink) and the perpetual motion Zero-moter; older son of Sampson and brother of Arthur

== Fictional characters ==
- Samwise Gamgee, a protagonist in The Lord of the Rings

== See also ==
- Gamgee Tissue, a type of surgical tissue developed by Sampson Gamgee
