= Seaman (name) =

Seaman is a surname and a given name. People with the name include:

- Alfred Seaman (c. 1844–1910), English photographer
- Allen L. Seaman (1916–1944), U.S. Navy pilot
- Art Seaman (1923–2007), American speed skater
- Arthur Edmund Seaman (1858–1937), American mineralogist
- Augusta Huiell Seaman (1879–1950), American children's writer
- Barbara Seaman (1935–2008), American author, activist, journalist, and women's health feminist
- Barrett Seaman, American non-fiction writer
- Bob Seaman (1932–2018), American college football coach
- Byron Seaman (1923–2021), Canadian businessman and co-owner of the Calgary Flames hockey team
- Camille Seaman (born 1969), American photographer
- Charlie Seaman (born 1999), English footballer
- Christopher Seaman (born 1942), British music conductor
- Clarence Seaman (1908–1974), British headmaster
- Cleora Augusta Stevens Seaman (1814–1869), American physician
- Daniel Seaman (born 1961), Israeli media professional and former civil servant
- Daryl Seaman (1922–2009), Canadian businessman and co-owner of the Calgary Flames hockey team
- Dave Seaman (born 1968), British DJ and record producer
- David Seaman (born 1963), English football goalkeeper
- David Seaman (writer), American writer and conspiracy theorist
- Elisha B. Seaman (c. 1838–1919), American soldier
- Elizabeth Cochrane Seaman a.k.a. Ellie Seaman (1864–1922), American journalist and philanthropist whose pen name was Nellie Bly
- Ernest Seaman (1893–1918), English soldier
- Eugene Cecil Seaman (1881–1950), American Episcopal bishop
- Ezra Seaman (1805–1880), American lawyer and political theorist
- Frederic Seaman (1906–2000), Indian field hockey player
- Galen Seaman (1837–1932), member of the Wisconsin State Assembly
- J. C. Seaman (1898–1964), member of the Louisiana House of Representatives
- Jill Seaman, American doctor
- Jonathan O. Seaman (1911–1986), United States Army career officer
- Justin M. Seaman, American filmmaker
- Kal Seaman (1915–2008), Canadian politician
- Keith Seaman (1920–2013), former Governor of South Australia (1977-1982)
- Keith Seaman (Arizona politician), member of the Arizona House of Representatives
- Kim Seaman (born 1957), American former baseball player
- Lazarus Seaman (died 1675), English nonconformist minister, supporter of the Presbyterian party, Master of Peterhouse, Cambridge
- Louis Livingston Seaman (1851–1932), American surgeon and writer
- Mary Jane Seaman (c. 1837–1888), English actress and singer
- Nancy Seaman (born 1952), American murderer
- Owen Seaman (1861–1936), British writer, editor of Punch magazine
- Peter Seaman (mayor) (1662–1715), Mayor of Norwich and High Sheriff of Norfolk
- Peter S. Seaman (born 1951), American screenwriter and film producer
- Rachel Seaman (born 1986), Canadian race walker
- Richard Seaman (1913–1939), English racing driver
- Robert Seaman (1822–1904), American industrialist and husband of Nellie Bly
- Ryan Seaman (born 1983), American musician and singer
- Ryan Seaman (racing driver) (born 1982), American NASCAR driver
- Sylvia B. Seaman (1900–1995), American suffragist and writer
- Tanya Seaman (1967–2022), American environmentalist
- Tim Seaman (born 1972), American race walker
- Valentine Seaman (1770–1817), American physician
- Victoria Seaman, American politician
- William Seaman (1925–1997), American photographer
- William B. Seaman (c. 1875–1910), American football and baseball player and coach
- William Grant Seaman (1866–1942), American Methodist Episcopal minister and academic
- William Henry Seaman (1842–1915), American lawyer and judge
- Seaman Dan (1929–2020), Torres Strait Islander (Australian) singer-songwriter
- Seaman Frank (1912–1949), British seaman
- Seaman Nobby Hall (1892–1953), Scottish boxer
- Seaman Jacobs (1912–2008), American screenwriter
- Seaman A. Knapp (1833–1911), American agronomist and university president
- Seaman Squyres (1910–1979), American football player

== See also ==
- Seamon (surname)
