= Voncken =

Voncken is German patronymic surname. Derived from the word vonk/vonck meaning "spark", it is derived from a nickname, possibly hinting at the occupation of blacksmith.

- Jules Voncken, German coxswain
- Stefan Voncken (1887–June 1975), Surgeon-General of the Belgian Medical Component
