= Seamon =

Seamon is a surname, a variant of Seaman. Notable people with the surname include:

- Billy Seamon (1917–1992), American bridge player
- D. Omer Seamon (1911–1997), American painter
- Edith Seamon (1911–2011), American bridge player
- Greg Seamon (born 1955), American football coach
- John Seamon (born 1943), American psychologist
- Michael Seamon (1960–2017), American bridge player
- Mike Seamon (born 1988), American soccer player
- Rita Seamon (1924–2022), American bridge player

== See also ==
- Janice Seamon-Molson (born 1956), American bridge player
