= Prophecy in The Lord of the Rings =

Theme in Tolkien's fantasy

Prophecy is a recurring element in the narrative of J. R. R. Tolkien's The Lord of the Rings. Tolkien echoes both biblical and Shakespearean prophecy in his epic novel. Close to prophecy are prophetic dreams and visions, and the use of divination through devices such as the Palantír and the Mirror of Galadriel. Among the results is a sense of the numinous, of glimpsing a world beyond Middle-earth. Tolkien's approach has been compared with those of the English poets Edmund Spenser and John Milton.

== Context ==
J. R. R. Tolkien was a devout Roman Catholic. He described The Lord of the Rings as rich in Christian symbolism. (Note: Carpenter 2023, Letters #142 to R. Murray SJ, 2 December 1953) Deirdre Greene writes that Tolkien, who "saw himself as inspired, saw his writing as sub-creation under God, and observed that his fiction seemed to come from outside himself", can be seen as part of an English tradition of prophetic verse going back to Edmund Spenser and John Milton. She adds that a major influence on these writers was the Bible, especially the Book of Revelation. Further, in her view, all three "display an angry distrust of the making of heterodox images". In Tolkien's case, that takes the form of having his evil characters distort images in the minds of their listeners. All three writers were both consciously Christian and trying to create "great national works, English epics." She comments that heroic narrative and the values of Christianity frequently conflict, creating "some discomfort" in all three men.

== Narrative ==
=== Prophecies ===
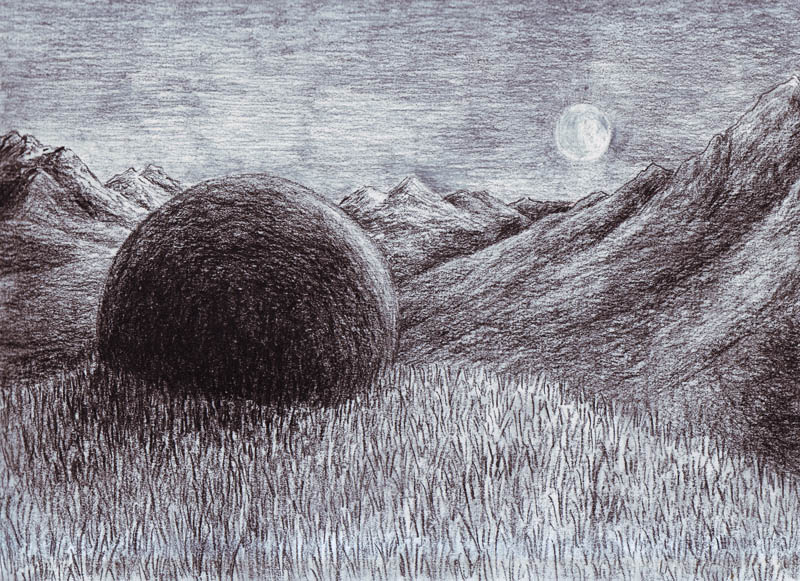
Malbeth the Seer prophesies that the Dead will come to the Stone of Erech in the mountains of Gondor. (Note: Tolkien 1955, book 5, ch. 2 "The Passing of the Grey Company,")

Early in the Third Age, the Elf Glorfindel confronts the Witch-king of Angmar, who flees. Glorfindel prophesies that the Witch-king would fall in the far future, but not by "the hand of man". (Note: Tolkien 1955, Appendix A, I, iv "Gondor and the heirs of Anarion") Many years later, during the War of the Ring, Éowyn (a woman) slays the Witch-king during the Battle of Pelennor Fields, assisted by Meriadoc Brandybuck (a Hobbit). (Note: Tolkien 1955, book 5, ch. 6 "The Battle of the Pelennor Fields")

At the Council of Elrond, Aragorn says the prophetic words "For the Sword that was Broken is the sword of Elendil that broke beneath him when he fell. It has been treasured by his heirs when all other heirlooms were lost; for it was spoken of old among us that it should be made again when the Ring, Isildur's Bane, was found". (Note: Tolkien 1954a, book 2, ch. 2 "The Council of Elrond")

Later, Aragorn quotes a second prophecy, spoken long before (in the time of the last King at Fornost, Arvedui) about the Paths of the Dead by Malbeth the Seer. It is 12 lines of verse, the longest prophecy in the novel, including the lines:

The Tower trembles, to the tombs of kings
doom approaches. The Dead awaken;
for the hour is come for the oathbreakers:
at the Stone of Erech they shall stand again

The Elf-lady Galadriel tells the Elf Legolas in verse that if he hears the cry of a seagull, his heart will never again rest in Middle-earth. When Legolas comes to the port of Pelargir, Galadriel's prophecy is fulfilled: as Legolas heard the cries of seagulls, he experienced the Sea-longing — the desire to sail west to Valinor, the "Blessed Realm", latent among his people. (Note: Tolkien 1955, book 5, ch. 9 "The Last Debate")

At Mount Doom, when the Hobbits Frodo and Sam were attacked by Gollum, Frodo grabs the Ring and appeared as "a figure robed in white... [that] held a wheel of fire". Frodo tells Gollum "in a commanding voice" that "If you touch me ever again, you shall be cast yourself into the Fire of Doom", a prophecy soon fulfilled. (Note: Tolkien 1955, book 6, ch. 3 "Mount Doom")

=== Prophetic dreams and visions ===
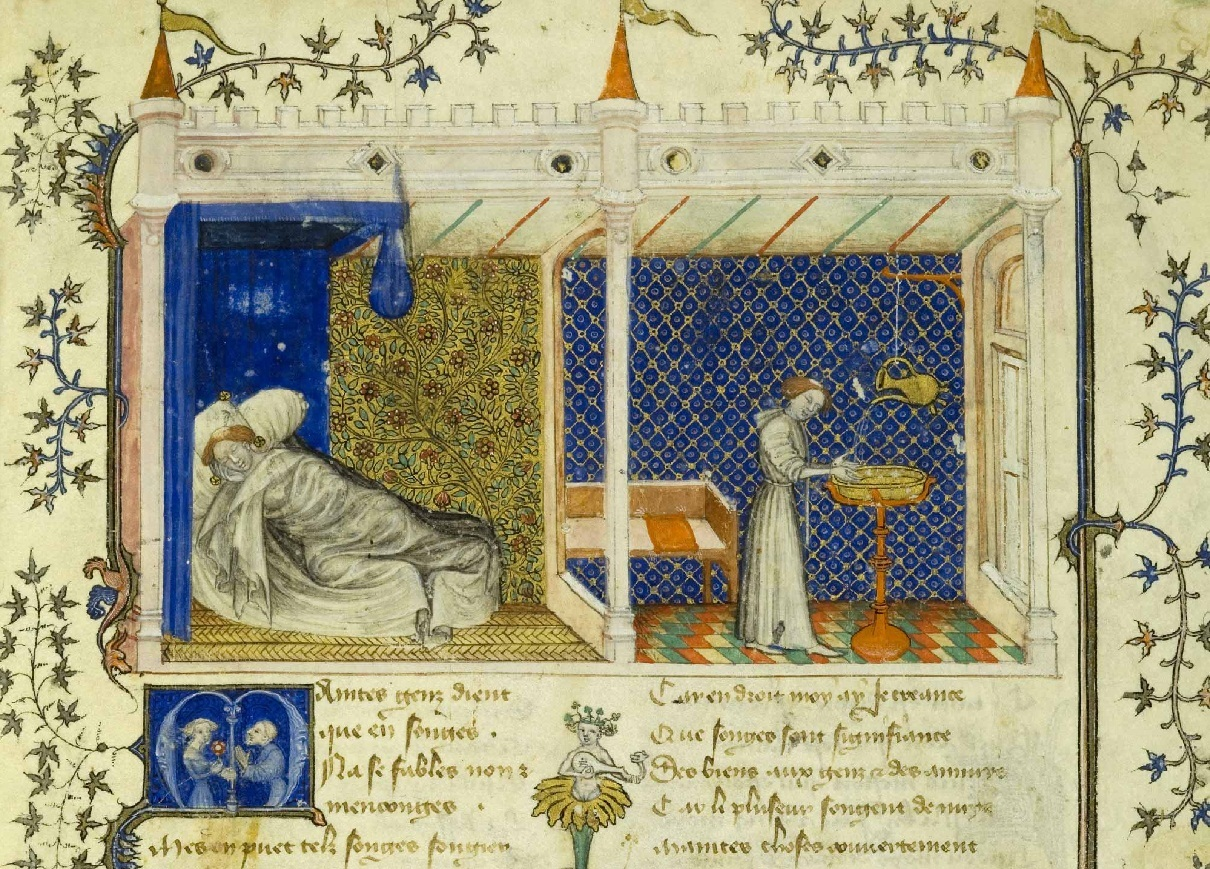
Tolkien followed the tradition of the medieval dream vision, here in Le Roman de la Rose

Other prophetic statements are presented as accounts of dreams and visions. Amy Amendt-Raduege writes that Tolkien was "follow[ing] the same conventions" as the common medieval literary device of dream vision or visio. This allows readers to pass over them as "interesting detail[s]", but to reflect on them in the light of later events. One such is Frodo's exclamation to Gandalf "I saw you!" when Gandalf narrates his rescue from the top of Orthanc by the Gwaihir the Eagle. Gandalf is "astonished". Another is Tom Bombadil's account of the Men of Westernesse who forged the daggers he gave to the Hobbits. The Hobbits "did not understand his words, but as he spoke they had a vision as it were of a great expanse of years behind them, like a vast shadowy plain over which there strode shapes of Men, tall and grim with bright swords, and last came one with a star on his brow." (Note: Tolkien 1954a, book 1, ch. 8 "Fog on the Barrow-downs") A third dream, the "most prominent", is the one shared by Boromir and Faramir, in which they hear the eight lines of verse forming a riddle that Boromir travels to the Council of Elrond to solve:

Seek for the Sword that was broken:
In Imladris it dwells;
There shall be counsels taken
Stronger than Morgul-spells.
There shall be shown a token
That Doom is near at hand,
For Isildur's Bane shall waken,
And the Halfling forth shall stand.

=== Divination ===
While accepting of prophecy, Tolkien is far more sceptical of the value of divination. Gandalf describes objects such as the Palantírs as dangerous, (Note: Tolkien 1954a, book 3, ch. 11 "The Palantír") offering an ambiguous vision of reality, and likely to deceive. The Mirror of Galadriel too offers magical but ambiguous visions, a perilous guide to future action. (Note: Tolkien 1954a, book 2, ch. 7 "The Mirror of Galadriel") Tredray comments that this echoes Macbeth, just as Éowyn's encounter with the Witch-king does.

== Analysis ==
=== Types ===
Julaire Andelin, in the J. R. R. Tolkien Encyclopedia, describes three types of prophecy in Middle-earth: actual prophecies of the future, by godlike Valar, Maiar (such as Wizards), or seers; "prophecy through the 'eyes of death'; and forebodings of the heart." Andelin writes that seers, whether Elves or Men, speak prophetically by unexplained means, which she suggests could be by some connection to the Music of creation, or by a gift from Ilúvatar the creator; and their prophecies were more ambiguous than those of the immortals. Still vaguer are forebodings of the heart, which only become clear when the event actually occurs.

=== Echoes of biblical prophecy ===
Numerous scholars have admired Tolkien's simile of Théoden riding into his final battle "like a god of old, even as Oromë the Great in the battle of the Valar when the world was young". (Note: Tolkien 1955, book 5, ch. 5 "The Ride of the Rohirrim") Among them, Steve Walker calls it "almost epic in its amplitude", inviting the reader's imagination by alluding "to unseen complexity", a whole mythology of Middle-earth under the visible text. The Anglican priest Fleming Rutledge calls it imitative of the language of myth and saga, and an echo of the messianic prophecy in Malachi 4:1-3.

The priest and Tolkien scholar Fleming Rutledge writes that Aragorn, narrating the Lay of Beren and Lúthien to the Hobbits, tells them that Lúthien's line "shall never fail". Rutledge talks of the "kings of Númenor, that is Westernesse", and as they gaze at him, they see that the moon "climbs behind him as if to crown him", which Rutledge calls an echo of the Transfiguration. Rutledge explains that Aragorn is of the line of Elendil and knows he will inherit "the crown of Elendil and the other Kings of vanished Númenor", just as Jesus is of the line of King David, fulfilling the prophecy that the line of Kings would not fail. Aragorn has been called a Christ-as-King character; Tolkien's use of prophecy has been compared to the Old Testament's foretelling of the coming of the Messiah. Aspects of Aragorn's character - his ability to heal, his sacrificial journey, and his experiences with death and the dead - have long been seen as clues to overt Messianic overtones.

=== Echoes of Shakespearean prophecy ===
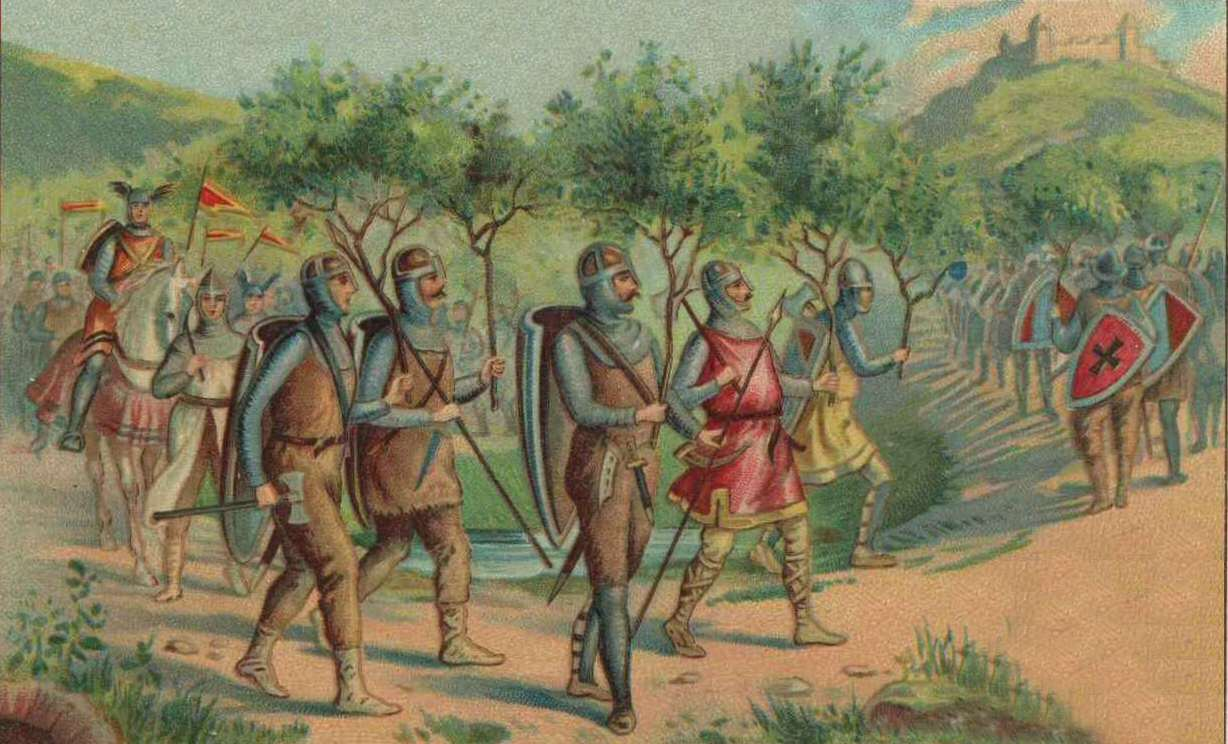
Birnam Wood comes to Dunsinane, in the form of branches carried by the soldiers, as described by Shakespeare. This was a prosaic resolution that Tolkien found deeply disappointing.

Tolkien found William Shakespeare's solution to how Birnam Wood could come to Dunsinane to fulfil the prophecy in Macbeth bitterly disappointing: the soldiers cut branches which they carry with them, giving something of the appearance of a wood, with an entirely non-magical explanation. Shippey comments that Tolkien transformed Shakespeare's theme so that trees actually could march to war: he has Ents (tree-giants) and Huorns (partially awakened trees) join the fight against the evil Wizard Saruman. The Ents destroy Saruman's fortress of Isengard; (Note: Tolkien 1954, book 3, ch. 9 "Flotsam and Jetsam") the Huorns march as a forest to Rohan's fortress of Helm's Deep, besieged by Saruman's army of Orcs. The Orcs find themselves trapped between the Men of Rohan and the Huorns; they flee into the vengeful Huorn forest, never to emerge. (Note: Tolkien 1954, book 3, ch. 7 "Helm's Deep")

Tolkien's reworking of Macbeth's use of prophecy
Author	Prophecy	Apparent meaning	Prosaic resolution	Mythic/magical resolution
Shakespeare	No man born of woman shall harm Macbeth.	Macbeth will not die violently.	Macduff, delivered by Caesarean section not born naturally, kills Macbeth.	———
Tolkien	No man living shall hinder the Witch-King.	The Witch-King is immortal.	———	A Hobbit (with a magical dagger made exactly for this purpose) and a woman kill the Witch-King.
Shakespeare	Birnam Wood will come to Dunsinane.	Impossible, the battle will never happen.	Soldiers cut branches and carry them to battle, giving the appearance of a wood.	———
Tolkien	———	———	———	Huorns, partially awakened trees, march to battle and destroy their Orc enemies.

=== Ambiguity ===
Julaire Andelin, in the J.R.R. Tolkien Encyclopedia, writes that prophecy in Middle-earth depended on characters' understanding of the Music of the Ainur, the divine plan for Arda, and was often ambiguous. Thus, Glorfindel's prophecy "not by the hand of man will [the Lord of the Nazgûl] fall" did not lead the Lord of the Nazgûl to suppose that he would die at the hands of a woman and a hobbit. (Note: Tolkien 1955, Appendix A, "Gondor and the Heirs of Anárion") The Tolkien scholar Tom Shippey states that the prophecy, and the Witch-king's surprise at finding Dernhelm to be a woman, parallel the witches' statement to Macbeth that he may "laugh to scorn / The power of man, for none of woman born / Shall harm Macbeth" (Act 4, scene 1), and Macbeth's shock at learning that Macduff "was from his mother's womb / Untimely ripp'd" (as Macduff was born by Caesarean section: Act 5, scene 8). Thus, Shippey notes, despite Tolkien's stated dislike of Shakespeare's treatment of myth, he read Macbeth closely.

=== Sense of the numinous ===
Robert Field Tredray writes in Mythlore that The Lord of the Rings strikes him with "a sense of the numinous". This goes, he writes, beyond what is expected in fantasy, with strange species; the reader glimpses "a world beyond Middle-earth", through divination – seeking knowledge of events by magical means, and prophecy – spontaneous prediction of future events. Tredray describes Aragorn's words at the Council of Elrond as a minor detail, "the reforging of a sword", but that the entire plot hangs on its being taken as a prophecy. Of Malbeth's prophecy, Tredray comments that "the reader cannot ignore it. But it establishes mood more than it advances the plot." He adds that Aragorn's choice to take the fateful Paths of the Dead "is certainly a crucial event" in the narrative, but that once again the prophecy is a small detail, and Aragorn had in fact already just said he would take that road.

Tredray writes that Aragorn also made a prophecy of his own, to Éomer, that "in battle we may meet again, though all the hosts of Mordor should stand between." He notes that both the "first-time reader" and Éomer assume this is just a conventional expression of rather doubtful hope. Only when they do actually meet in the middle of the Battle of the Pelennor Fields does Éomer realise that Aragorn had the gift of prophecy.

== Sources ==
- Andelin, Julaire (2013) [2007]. "Prophecy". In Drout, Michael D. C. (ed.). J.R.R. Tolkien Encyclopedia. Routledge. pp. 544–545. ISBN 978-0-415-86511-1.
- Carpenter, Humphrey, ed. (2023) [1981]. The Letters of J. R. R. Tolkien: Revised and Expanded Edition. New York: HarperCollins. ISBN 978-0-35-865298-4.
- Greene, Dierdre (1996). "Higher Argument: Tolkien and the Tradition of Vision, Epic and Prophecy". Mythlore. 21 (33): 45–52.
- Hunt, Emily (2005). "Wilderness, Wanderers and Their Theological Significance in J. R. R. Tolkien's The Lord of the Rings". In Sugirtharajah, R. S. (ed.). Wilderness: Essays in Honour of Frances Young. T&T Clark International. pp. 175–186. ISBN 0-567-04142-5.
- Amendt-Raduege, Amy (2006). "Dream Visions in J.R.R. Tolkien's The Lord of the Rings". Tolkien Studies. 3 (1): 45–55. doi:10.1353/tks.2006.0002.
- Rosebury, Brian (2003) [1992]. Tolkien: A Cultural Phenomenon. Palgrave. ISBN 978-1403-91263-3.
- Rutledge, Fleming (2004). The Battle for Middle-earth: Tolkien's Divine Design in The Lord of the Rings. Wm. B. Eerdmans. ISBN 978-0-8028-2497-4.
- Scarf, Christopher (2013). The Ideal of Kingship in the Writings of Charles Williams, C.S. Lewis and J.R.R. Tolkien. Part Three: Monarchy and Middle-Earth: James Clarke. pp. 112–129. ISBN 978-0227174012.
- Shippey, Tom (2005) [1982]. The Road to Middle-Earth: How J. R. R. Tolkien Created a New Mythology (Third ed.). HarperCollins. ISBN 978-0-261-10275-0.
- Shippey, Tom (2016). "The Curious Case of Denethor and the Palantír, Once More". Mallorn (57): 6–9.
- Tolkien, J. R. R. (1954a). The Fellowship of the Ring. The Lord of the Rings. Boston: Houghton Mifflin. OCLC 9552942.
- Tolkien, J. R. R. (1954). The Two Towers. The Lord of the Rings. Boston: Houghton Mifflin. OCLC 1042159111.
- Tolkien, J. R. R. (1955). The Return of the King. The Lord of the Rings. Boston: Houghton Mifflin. OCLC 519647821.
- Tredray, Robert Field (2018). "Divination and Prophecy in The lord of the Rings". Mythlore. 36 (2): 251–258.
- Walker, Steve C. (2009). The Power of Tolkien's Prose: Middle-Earth's Magical Style. Palgrave Macmillan. ISBN 978-0230101661.
- Wood, Ralph C. (2003). The Gospel According to Tolkien: Visions of the Kingdom in Middle-Earth. John Knox Press. ISBN 978-0664226107.
