= BHSF =

BHSF may refer to:

- Birmingham Hospital Saturday Fund
- Beijing No.4 High School, which is also referred to as Beijing High School Four (BHSF)
