= Highland Lawn Cemetery =

Cemetery in Indiana, United States

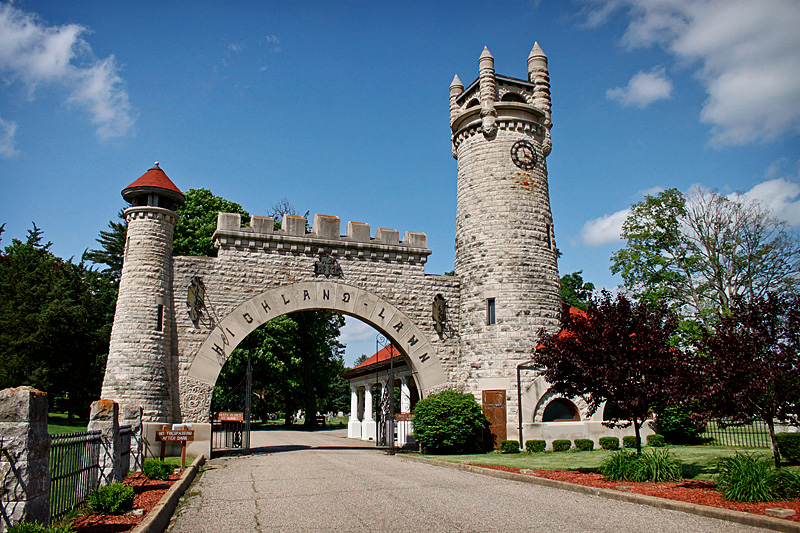
- The entrance to Highland Lawn Cemetery
- Interactive map of Highland Lawn Cemetery

Details
- Established: 1884
- Location: 4520 Wabash Ave., Terre Haute, Indiana
- Country: US
- Coordinates: 39°28′35″N 87°20′52″W
- Size: 139 acres (56 ha)
- No. of graves: over 45,000+
- Find a Grave: Highland Lawn Cemetery
- The Political Graveyard: Highland Lawn Cemetery
- Highland Lawn Cemetery
- U.S. National Register of Historic Places
- Architect: Vrydaugh, Jesse A.; Heidenreich Company; Floyd, W.H.
- Architectural style: Richardsonian Romanesque
- NRHP reference No.: 90001790
- Added to NRHP: November 29, 1990

Highland Lawn Cemetery is a city-owned cemetery in Terre Haute, Indiana. Opened in 1884, the cemetery includes 139 acres (0.56 km^{2}).

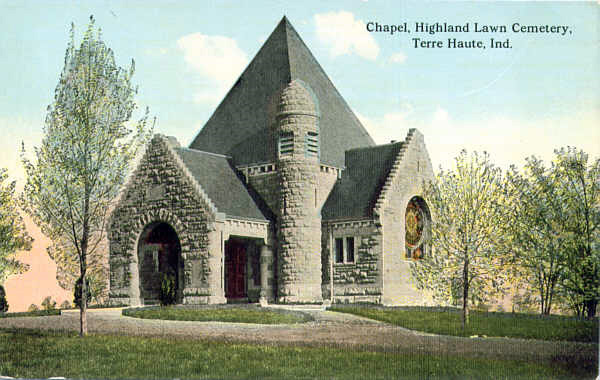
The Highland Lawn Cemetery Chapel, circa 1914.

The cemetery features a Richardsonian Romanesque chapel built by architect Jesse A. Vrydaugh in 1893 for a cost of $10,000. In the 1980s, the chapel underwent renovation which was completed in March 1988. Highland Lawn also includes a bell tower built by the Heidenreich Company in 1894, a gateway arch completed by Edward Hazledine and a Colonial rest house designed by W.H. Floyd.

Highland Lawn was placed on the National Register of Historic Places in 1990 for its significance in agriculture and landscaping.

== Folklore ==
The cemetery is known in local folklore including the story of Stiffy Green, an allegedly-taxidermied dog (actually a statue) buried in his owner's tomb who was said to bark periodically; and of Martin Sheets, who was convinced he would be buried alive and thus installed a telephone inside of his tomb with a direct line to the cemetery's main office.

== Notable burials ==
- Ellen Church (1904–1965), aviation innovator and nurse
- Eugene Debs (1855–1926), socialist and politician
- Theodore Debs (1864–1945), Eugene's brother and socialist political activist
- Max Ehrmann (1872–1945), writer, poet, and attorney
- Courtland Gillen (1880–1954), U.S. Representative
- Virginia E. Jenckes (1877–1975), First female U.S. Representative from Indiana
- Eva Mozes Kor (1934–2019), Holocaust survivor and activist
- Juliet Peddle (1899–1979), architect
- Allen Pence (1819–1908), pharmacist and pioneer of spiritualism
- Everett Sanders (1882–1950), politician and republican
- D. Omer Seamon (1911–1997), painter
- Valeska Suratt (1882–1962), silent film and stage actress
- Bud Taylor (1903–1962), boxer
