= International Committee of Military Medicine =

International Committee of Military Medicine (ICMM)
- Emblem of the International Committee of Military Medicine
- Established: 21 July 1921
- Headquarters: Brussels, Belgium
- Secretary-General (Ad Interim): Lieutenant General Pierre Neirinckx, MD
- Website: www.cimm-icmm.org

The International Committee of Military Medicine (ICMM) is an international and intergovernmental organization consisting of more than one hundred states. The ICMM was established in 1921, in response to concerns over the lack of care provided during World War I. It was created to strengthen cooperation between the health services of the armed forces worldwide.

== History ==
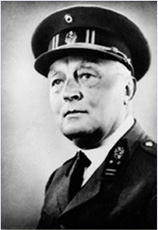
General Doctor Jules Voncken (Belgium), co-founder and Secretary General of the International Committee of Military Medicine from 1921 until 1975

In 1920, after issues were raise including lack of care for victims and the need for closer cooperation between armed forces medical services following World War I, Captain William S. Bainbridge, MD (US Navy) and Commander Medical Officer Jules Voncken (Belgium) suggested the creation of an international organisation of the Armed Forces Medical Services at the 28th session of the US Military Medical Officers Association (AMSUS). The Belgian Government supported the practical development of this concept and the first International Congress of Military Medicine and Pharmacy was held in July 1921 in Brussels, Belgium, in presence of King Albert I. It resulted in a permanent Committee of International Congresses of Military Medicine and Pharmacy (ICMPM) being officially founded on 21 July 1921 during the Congress. The founding countries were Belgium, Brazil, France, Italy, Spain, Switzerland, the United Kingdom and the United States.

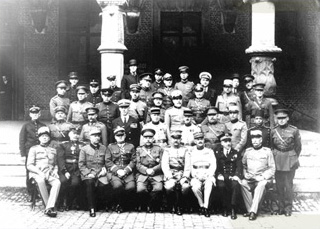
First International Assembly of Medical Services of the Armies, Navies and Air Forces, July 1921, Belgium

Since its founding, ICMPM has always gathered military Health Services from all political blocs, in uniform, including during the Cold War. On 21 May 1952, an agreement of cooperation was signed with the World Health Organization (WHO) which recognised the committee as an "international body specialised in medico-military matters". On 28 April 1990, the Committee changed its name and became the International Committee of Military Medicine (ICMM). New ICMM Statutes, revised in line with modern-day policies, were voted in at the General Assembly held in Beijing, China, in 1996. ICMM signed a memorandum of understanding with World Health Organization in 2004 and the World Organisation for Animal Health (OIE) in 2006.

== Objectives of ICMM ==
The main objective of the ICMM is to ensure that our medical services personnel have the means to work together, using similar practices, in operations involving international cooperation. This is a long-term goal and the ICMM can work towards it in a number of ways: by encouraging activities at which scientific and technical experience is shared, by developing contacts with the scientific community, and by promoting regional events. This will enable the pooling of resources and work experience of military medicine, both in the theatre of operations and in a support role in the case of crisis situations.

Other ICMM objectives include:

- Maintain and strengthen relations between medical services of member states
- Promote scientific military medical activities
- Provide best practices and standards which member states can aim for
- Help develop medical and military medical recommendations for humanitarian operations (these could range from Armed Forces humanitarian interventions to peacekeeping operations)
- facilitate relations between armed forces medical services of ICMM member states and international organizations such as the World Health Organization (WHO), the World Organisation for Animal Health (OIE), the Joint United Nations Programme on HIV/AIDS (UNAIDS), the International Military Sports Council (IMSC), the World Veterinary Association (WVA), the World Medical Association (WMA) and the International Pharmaceutical Federation (FIP).

The above objectives are intended to improve the state of military medicine through providing means of screening personnel, providing access to medicine within military units, improving surgery in the theatre of operations, improving access to emergency medicine, improving disaster response, providing medical logistics training, and improving public health, dentistry, pharmacy, and veterinary services.

== Activities ==
In addition to the annual World Congress of the International Committee of Military Medicine, the ICMM organises regional congresses, including the Pan-Asia Pacific, Pan-American, Pan-African, Pan-European, Maghreb and Pan-Arab Regional working groups. The ICMM also publishes the quarterly International Review of the Armed Forces Medical Services, providing a material link between medical services and member states.

== Study of Training and Coaching ==
In the field of training and coaching, the ICMM objectives are:

- Enabling exchange of ideas on training methods used in the world
- Establishing non-restrictive guidelines
- Establishing a database of existing training
- Organizing international courses

== Assessment of disaster situations ==
The ICMM promotes discussions on medical services activity during disasters.

== Cooperation with international organizations ==
The ICMM has signed agreements with WHO, ICRC, OIE, UNAIDS, CISM, WVA, WMA and FIP. These agreements provide for cooperation with medical services of member states in order to detect and respond to major epidemics posing a global threat to public health. WHO, ICRC, OIE, UNAIDS, CISM, WVA, WMA and FIP contact each government individually.

== Study of International Humanitarian Law evolution ==
A Course of Law of Armed Conflicts is organized each year with the support of Switzerland. This course is actually decentralized in different regions of the world.

== Structure and Working of ICMM ==
The ICMM is a politically neutral international intergovernmental organization.

The ICMM is made up of 119 member states and 3 observer States, all of which are either members of the United Nations (UN), have the status of official observers with in the UN, or are recognised as members of WHO. Each member state is represented by an official delegate who is appointed by the government of his country. Each member state brings a request issued from the Ministry of Defense, Foreign Affairs, or other high state authority, requesting to be a member of ICMM. This request is addressed to the Secretary General and approved during a session of the General Assembly of the Member States during the World Congress every two years. Each Member State pays a subscription determined by its GDP, debt level, and population. This subscription gives the state the right to vote in the General Assembly and to organize activities acknowledged by the ICMM. A moral duty of active participation follows the membership of member states. The General Assembly's recommendations are always non-restrictive and strictly observe each member state's sovereignty principle. Only the political power of each member state can change ICMM recommendations into rules applicable to its own Armed Forces.

In accordance with ICMM's statutes and history, Belgium is the seat of the Secretary General, the executive branch of ICMM. The stability of the headquarters is maintained for continuity. All participants are volunteer except a few paid executive secretaries. The Secretary-General is elected by the General Assembly for a 4-years renewable mandate. He is at the head of the ICMM executive branch. The current Secretary-General (Ad Interim) is Lieutenant General Pierre Neirinckx, MD, assisted by his Deputy Secretary-General and his assistants. They represent the political body of the Secretariat General. The Secretary General and his Deputy are Belgians, according with the statutes of ICMM. The Secretary General executes the decisions of the General Assembly. The General Assembly holds the World Congresses every two years, led by the Chairman of the ICMM, chosen by the member state selected to organise that World Congress. He is at the head of the ICMM legislative branch by supervising the General Assembly's work during the World Congress in his country. His mandate, not renewable, runs for the duration between two General Assemblies. The Secretary General reports his executive activities to the chairman.

All scientific matters are controlled by the Scientific Council, directed by the Chairman of the Scientific Council, Major General Humbert Boisseaux, MD. He is elected by the General Assembly for a 4-year renewable mandate. He is assisted by the Deputy Chairman of the Scientific Council, General Jean-Jacques Lataillade, MD, also elected by the General Assembly for a 4-year renewable mandate. To help the Scientific Council, there are Technical Commissions in following specialities: Veterinarian, Pharmacy, Dentistry, Logistics and Education. Their Chairmen are also elected by the General Assembly for a 4-years renewable mandate.

The 44th ICMM World Congress on Military Medicine was hosted by Belgium, in Brussels, in September 2022.
