= Divination in The Lord of the Rings =

Theme in Tolkien's fantasy

Divination, the attempt to foretell future events, appears in J. R. R. Tolkien's epic fantasy novel The Lord of the Rings mainly in the form of the use of a Palantír or of the Mirror of Galadriel. In the novel, Tolkien appears skeptical of the value of divination, seeing the process as dangerous and likely to lead to mistaken actions. The Dark Lord Sauron and Denethor, the Steward of Gondor, are both deceived through the Palantír. Galadriel is circumspect about the use of her Mirror, warning the Hobbits Frodo and Sam that while it can be useful, it is a dangerous guide to action. This is in sharp contrast to Macbeth's actions in Shakespeare's play, where the witches that he consults tell the truth, and what they predict comes about, but not in the form that Macbeth had imagined, with disastrous results.

== Context ==
J. R. R. Tolkien was a devout Roman Catholic, and he described The Lord of the Rings in particular as a "fundamentally religious and Catholic work; unconsciously so at first, but consciously in the revision". (Note: Carpenter 2023, Letters #142 to R. Murray S.J., 2 December 1953) While accepting of prophecy and dream visions in The Lord of the Rings, Tolkien is skeptical of the value of divination, seeing objects such as the Palantírs as (in the character Gandalf's words) "Perilous to us all are the devices of an art deeper than we possess ourselves." (Note: Tolkien 1954a, book 3, ch. 11 "The Palantír") Actions conducted through looking in a magical device are likely to be mistaken, as the device offers an ambiguous vision of reality. Robert Field Tredray writes that for Tolkien, "divination is highly problematical. It is not to be trusted, although it may be useful. It must be interpreted, and that is not easy, even for the wisest." The connections it offers are ambiguous; "difficulties are not magically dissolved".

== Things used for divination ==
=== Palantír ===
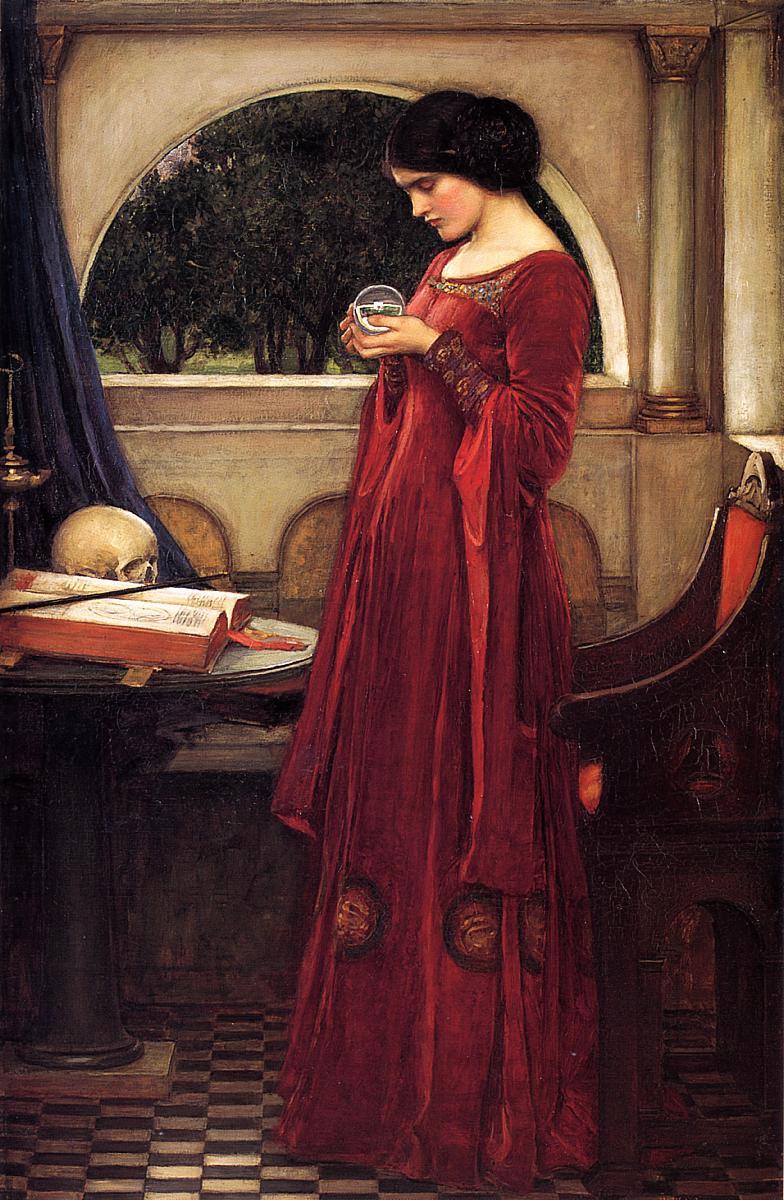
Tom Shippey suggests that the palantírs' deceptiveness means that one should trust in providence, not crystal balls. Painting by J.W. Waterhouse, 1902

A palantír enabled its user to see places far off, or events in the past. (Note: Tolkien 1980 Unfinished Tales, part 4, 3. "The palantíri") (Note: Tolkien 1977 The Silmarillion, "Of the Rings of Power and the Third Age") A person could look into a palantír to communicate with anyone looking into another palantír. They could then see "visions of the things in the mind" of the person looking into the other stone.

A wielder of great power such as Sauron could dominate a weaker user through a Palantír, which was the experience of Pippin Took and Saruman. Even one as powerful as Sauron could not make the palantírs "lie", or create false images; the most he could do was to selectively display truthful images to create a false impression in the viewer's mind. In The Lord of the Rings, three such uses of the stones are described, and in each case, a true image is shown, but the viewer draws a false conclusion from the facts. This applies to Sauron when he sees Pippin in Saruman's stone and assumes that Pippin has the One Ring, and that Saruman has therefore captured it. (Note: Tolkien 1954, book 3, ch. 11 "The Palantír") Denethor, too, is deceived through his use of a palantír, this time by Sauron, who drives Denethor to suicide by truthfully showing him the Black Fleet approaching Gondor, without telling him that the ships are crewed by Aragorn's troops, coming to Gondor's rescue. The Tolkien scholar Tom Shippey suggests that this consistent pattern is Tolkien's way of telling the reader that one should not "speculate" – the word meaning both to try to double-guess the future, and to look into a mirror (Latin: speculum 'glass or mirror') or crystal ball – but should trust in one's luck and make one's own mind up, courageously facing one's duty in each situation.

Tom Shippey's analysis of uses of palantírs, with consistently unpredictable effects
Viewer	Image	Presenter	Incorrect assumption	Actually	Result, deceived
The Dark Lord; Sauron	Pippin, a hobbit	Pippin, foolishly	Pippin is "the halfling", and has the One Ring; Saruman has captured it	Another halfling, Frodo, has the Ring	Sends Nazgûl to Orthanc, does not watch Ithilien
The Steward of Gondor; Denethor	Sauron's armed might, fleet of Corsairs of Umbar approaching Gondor	Sauron, selectively	Fleet is the enemy; victory in battle impossible	Aragorn has captured the fleet	Commits suicide
Sauron	Elendil's heir (Aragorn) with Elendil's sword	Aragorn, boldly	Aragorn now has the Ring, will soon attack Mordor	The Ring is on its way to Mordor	Attacks Gondor prematurely; fails to guard Cirith Ungol or to watch Mordor

=== Mirror of Galadriel ===
==== Ambiguous visions ====
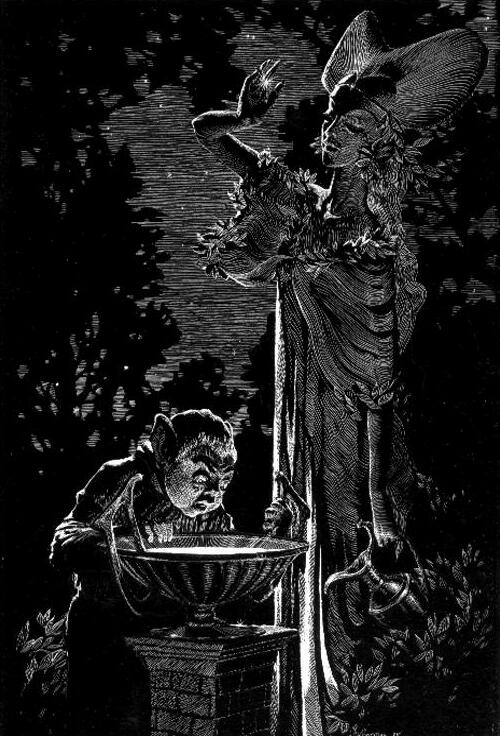
Galadriel allowing Frodo to look into her mirror. Alexander Korotich, scraperboard, 1981

The Mirror of Galadriel offers magical but ambiguous visions, as the Elf-lady Galadriel explains to Frodo: (Note: Tolkien 1954a, book 2 ch. 7 "The Mirror of Galadriel")

"Many things I can command the Mirror to reveal", she answered, "and to some I can show what they desire to see. But the Mirror will also show things unbidden, and those are often stranger and more profitable than things we wish to behold. What you will see, if you leave the Mirror free to work, I cannot tell. For it shows things that were, and things that are, and things that yet may be. But which it is that he sees, even the wisest cannot always tell. Do you wish to look?"

Galadriel further tells Sam that "the Mirror shows many things, and not all have yet come to pass. Some never come to be, unless those that behold the visions turn aside from their path to prevent them. The Mirror is dangerous as a guide of deeds." Tredray comments in Mythlore that this echoes Macbeth, just as Éowyn's encounter with the Witch-king does.

==== Celtic-style well ====
Noelia Ramos-Soria writes that wells can be "portals to alternate realms" in Celtic mythology, as in The Lord of the Rings. Galadriel's mirror permits divination by, she writes, an unstated mechanism involving Lothlórien's water, "a silver stream that issued from the fountain on the hill", together with the ritualised act of pouring water into the mirror, breathing on the surface of the water, and the power of Galadriel herself and her ring, Nenya, associated with the element of water. Alongside this magical power of divination, the water "serves as a symbolic conduit between worlds and a gateway to the afterlife, echoing broader mythological motifs."

==== Contrast with Macbeth ====
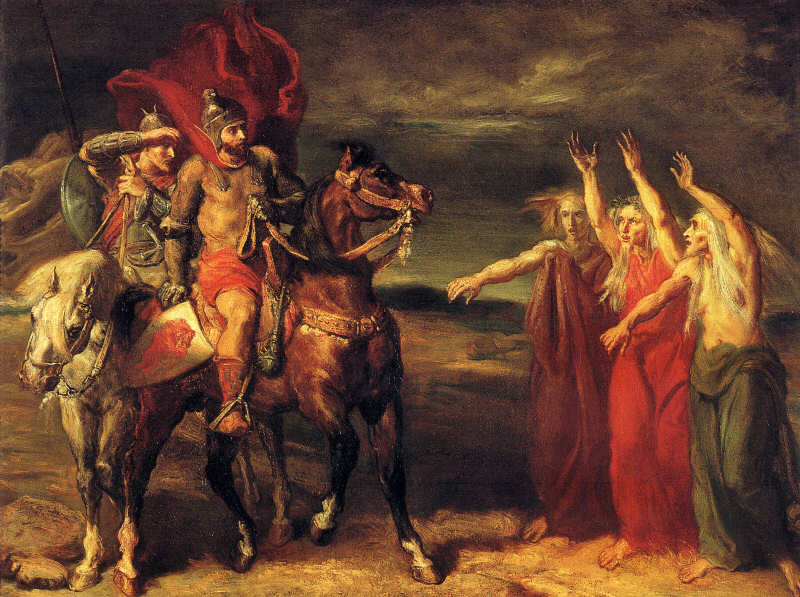
Nobody warned Macbeth that what the witches said would be true, but dangerous as a guide to action, as Galadriel helpfully warns Sam. Painting by Théodore Chassériau, 1855

Janet Brennan Croft contrasts Tolkien's ideas of "magic and divination" with those in William Shakespeare's Macbeth. Where Galadriel immediately warns the hobbits that the visions seen in her mirror may "never come to be, unless those that behold the visions turn aside from their path to prevent them", nobody helpfully tells Macbeth that "before he tried to help destiny along", she remarks. Macbeth's witches always told the truth: what they say comes to be, though not necessarily in the form their listeners imagined. The visions in Galadriel's mirror are, Croft writes, more like parallel worlds in science fiction: future choices will determine which vision actually comes into being in reality.

=== Other means ===
==== The One Ring ====
Håkan Arvidsson writes in Mallorn that the legendary figure of the Alchemist is both a smith and a magician, his symbol a gold ring shaped as the Ouroboros, the serpent that devours itself, its tail in its mouth. He states that the ring denotes both eternity and universal knowledge; and that rings have been used for divination "throughout history", in the practice of dactylomancy. The alchemist may be good or evil: Arvidsson suggests that evil alchemists, such as the Dark Lord Sauron, wish to transform and destroy the world.

==== One's "heart" ====
As well as artefacts made for the purpose, the Wizard Gandalf on occasion says that his "heart" tells him something, meaning a credible but non-specific foreboding that does not add up to a prophecy as such. For example, in "The Shadow of the Past", Gandalf speaks against killing Gollum because he will play a part in the quest to destroy the One Ring:

'And he [Gollum] is bound up with the fate of the Ring. My heart tells me that he has some part to play yet, for good or ill...' (Note: Tolkien 1954a, book 1, ch. 2 "The Shadow of the Past")

Similarly, in "The Council of Elrond", Gandalf again speaks of Gollum's unforeseen role:

Well, well, he [Gollum] is gone ... But he may play a part yet that neither he nor Sauron have foreseen (Note: Tolkien 1954a, book 2, ch. 2 "The Council of Elrond")

== Sources ==
- Arvidsson, Håkan (2002). "The Ring: An essay on Tolkien's mythology". Mallorn (40): 45–52.
- Carpenter, Humphrey, ed. (2023) [1981]. The Letters of J. R. R. Tolkien: Revised and Expanded Edition. New York: HarperCollins. ISBN 978-0-35-865298-4.
- Croft, Janet Brennan (2004). "'Bid the Tree Unfix His Earth-Bound Root': Motifs from 'Macbeth' in J.R.R. Tolkien's The Lord of the Rings". VII: Journal of the Marion E. Wade Center. 21: 47–59. JSTOR 45297044.
- Kocher, Paul (1974) [1972]. Master of Middle-earth: The Achievement of J.R.R. Tolkien. Penguin Books. ISBN 978-0140038774.
- Ramos-Soria, Noelia (2024). "'The world has changed. I see it in the water, I feel it in the Earth, I smell it in the air': The Celtic Otherworld in The Lord of the Rings (1954-1955)". Journal of Artistic Creation & Literary Research. 12 (1).
- Reinken, Donald L. (1966). "The Lord of the Rings: A Christian Refounding of the Political Order". Tolkien Journal. 2 (3). Article 1.
- Shippey, Tom (2001). J. R. R. Tolkien: Author of the Century. HarperCollins. ISBN 978-0261-10401-3.
- Shippey, Tom (2005) [1982]. The Road to Middle-Earth: How J. R. R. Tolkien Created a New Mythology (Third ed.). HarperCollins. ISBN 978-0-261-10275-0.
- Shippey, Tom (2016). "The Curious Case of Denethor and the Palantír, Once More". Mallorn (57): 6–9.
- Tolkien, J. R. R. (1954a). The Fellowship of the Ring. The Lord of the Rings. Boston: Houghton Mifflin. OCLC 9552942.
- Tolkien, J. R. R. (1954). The Two Towers. The Lord of the Rings. Boston: Houghton Mifflin. OCLC 1042159111.
- Tolkien, J. R. R. (1977). Christopher Tolkien (ed.). The Silmarillion. Boston: Houghton Mifflin. ISBN 978-0-395-25730-2.
- Tolkien, J. R. R. (1980). Christopher Tolkien (ed.). Unfinished Tales. Boston: Houghton Mifflin. ISBN 978-0-395-29917-3.
- Tredray, Robert Field (2018). "Divination and Prophecy in The lord of the Rings". Mythlore. 36 (2): 251–258.
