= PhillyCarShare =

Car-sharing organization in Philadelphia, US

- Type: Non-profit
- Industry: Car sharing
- Founded: 2002
- Founder: Tanya Seaman, founder
- Defunct: 2014
- Fate: Sold to Enterprise Holdings in 2011
- Successor: Enterprise CarShare
- Headquarters: Philadelphia, Pennsylvania, United States
- Website: www.phillycarshare.org

PhillyCarShare was a non-profit car-sharing organization in Philadelphia, Pennsylvania established in 2002. The service was acquired by Enterprise in 2011 and in 2014 was renamed Enterprise CarShare.

PhillyCarShare has cars available for use 24 hours per day throughout the city of Philadelphia and the region. The company works to reduce the number of cars on the road, promote the use of gas-saving automobiles, reduce pollution, promote a car-free lifestyle, and save its members money.

== Community impact ==
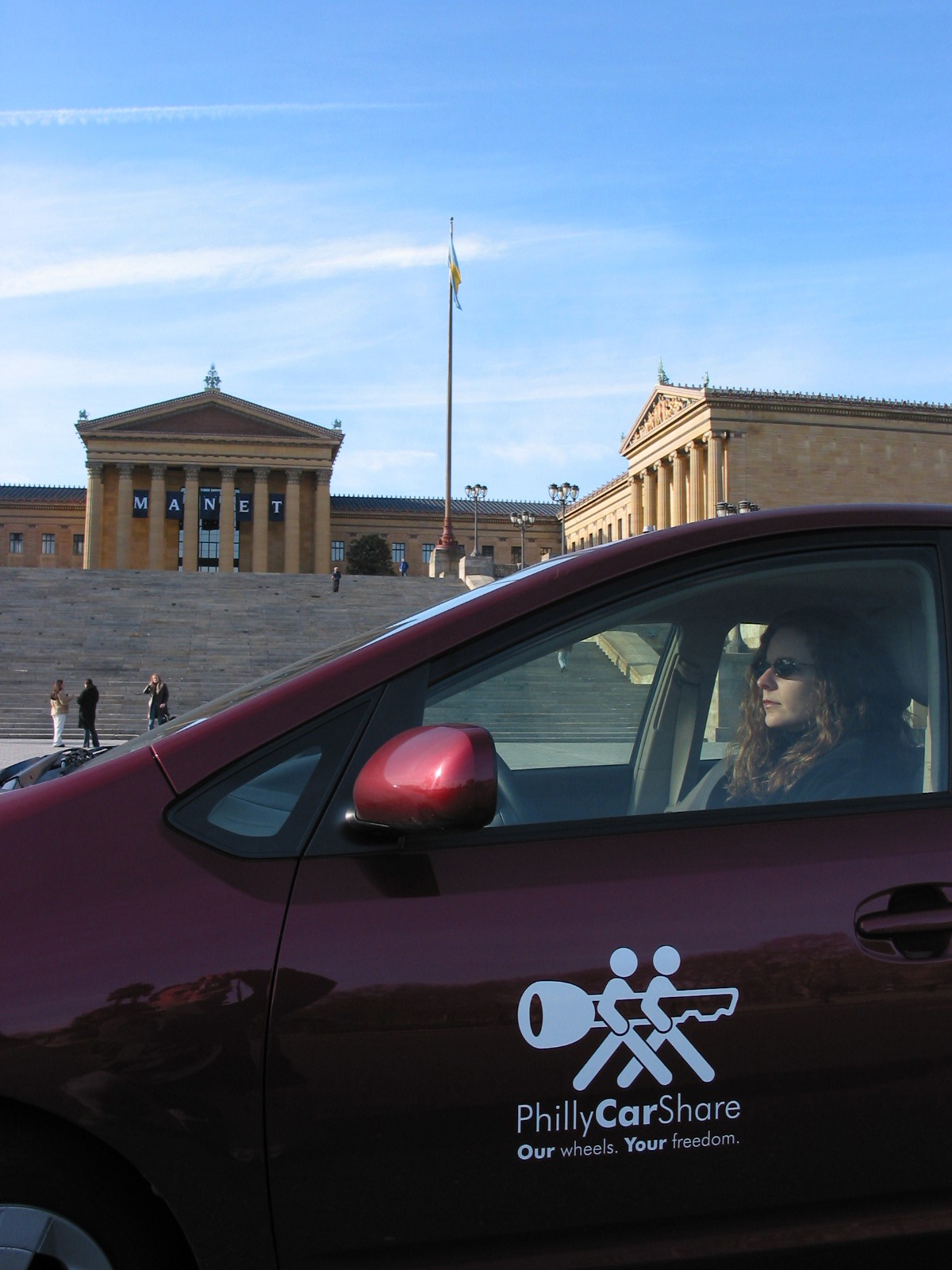
PhillyCarShare in front of the Philadelphia Museum of Art

Its partnership vehicle-sharing program with the City of Philadelphia was named one of 18 national finalists for the Innovations in American Government Awards, which are overseen by the Ash Institute for Democratic Governance and Innovation at Harvard University's John F. Kennedy School of Government. This program allowed city workers to utilize car-sharing vehicles, and allowed the city to reduce its fleet of underutilized city-owned vehicles by 330 cars. The fleet reduction is estimated to have saved the City of Philadelphia $8 million. The City of Wilmington, Delaware joined PhillyCarShare in 2007.

With the partnership between the City of Philadelphia and PhillyCarShare, the City became the first "government worldwide to share cars with local residents in a major fleet reduction effort."

In October 2007, PhillyCarShare announced that its membership had reached 30,000. At the time of acquisition by Enterprise in 2011, it was reported that there was a membership of 13,000.

== Fleet ==
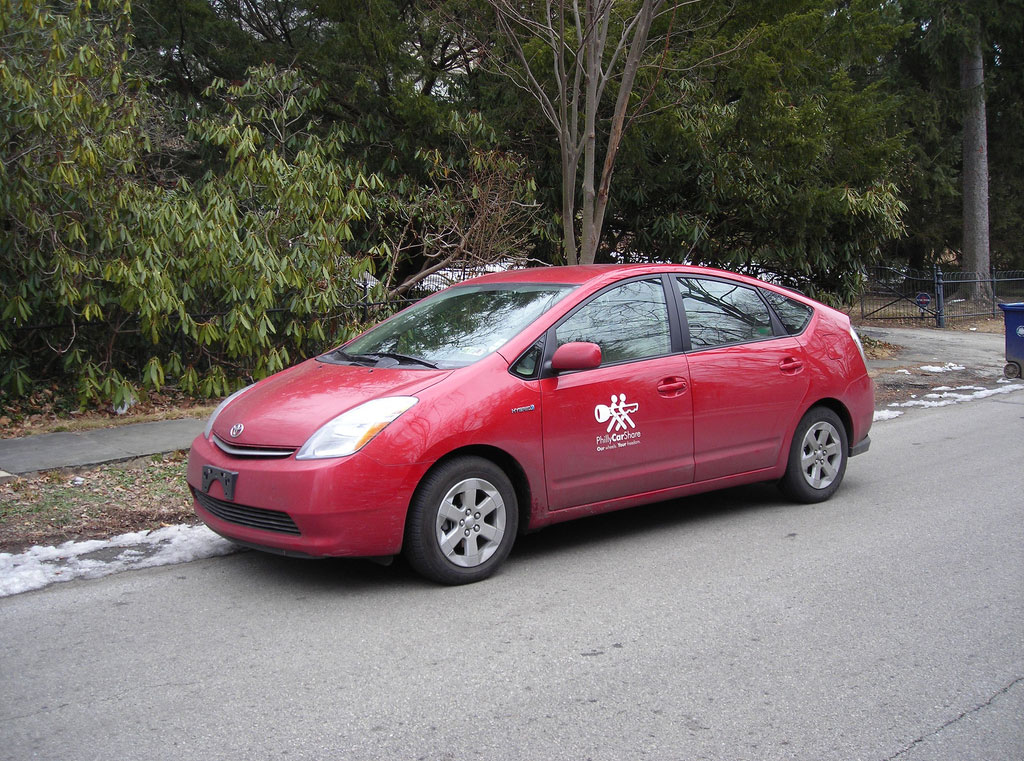
Toyota Prius used by PhillyCarShare.

The PhillyCarShare fleet includes over two dozen makes and models. Nearly half the fleet is made up of hybrid vehicles, including the Toyota Prius, Honda Civic Hybrid, and Camry Hybrid. Other cars include the Toyota Tacoma, Honda Element, Mazda3, Audi A4, Volvo S40, Ford Focus, Toyota Matrix, Dodge Caravan, Honda Fit, Scion xA, Scion xB, Scion xD, Subaru Impreza, Toyota Yaris, Acura TL, Mini Hatch, Toyota Corolla and Toyota Sienna.

In July 2008, PhillyCarShare told its members that Toyota has cancelled most of their 2008 hybrid order due to high demand for hybrids from the retail segment, causing a temporary reduction in the number of hybrids in their fleet.

== Marketing ==
PhillyCarShare introduced their Key to the City program in 2007 bringing discounts to Philadelphia area retailers. All members have a keytag which they can show at participating retailers to enjoy exclusive discounts. Discounts include local eateries, shops and cultural institutions.

In 2006, PhillyCarShare began issuing a "music to drive by" CD entitled "Philly Sound Clash." Copies of the CD are placed in all of the vehicles, and members are encouraged to take home as many copies as they desire. The CD features local Philadelphia artists in a battle of the bands type contest, 2007's winner was Philadelphia Slick.
