= Cleora Augusta Stevens Seaman =

American physician (1814–1869)

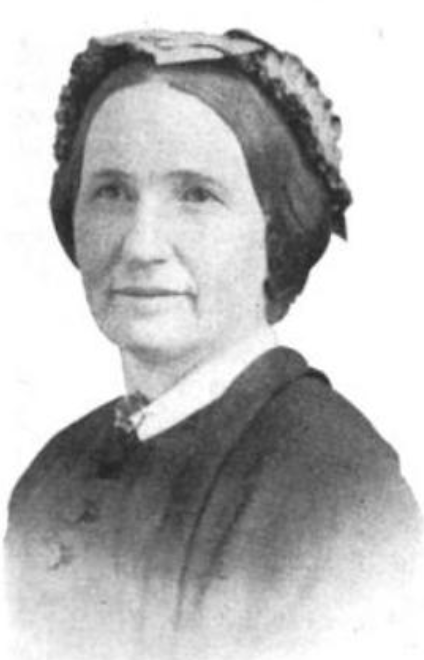
- Cleora Augusta Seaman, from a 1921 publication
- Born: 1814; Middlebury, Vermont, U.S.
- Died: 1869 (aged 54–55); Providence, Rhode Island, U.S.
- Occupation: Physician
- Spouse: John Farmer Seaman (m. 1833)
- Children: 7
- Relatives: William Seaman Bainbridge (grandson); William Sims Bainbridge (great-great-grandson)

Cleora Augusta Stevens Seaman (June 9, 1814 – July 10, 1869) was an American medical doctor based in Cleveland, Ohio.

== Early life and education ==
Stevens was born in Middlebury, Vermont, and raised in Rochester, New York, the daughter of Levi Stevens and Lucy Boynton Stevens. In midlife, she pursued a medical education at Western College of Homeopathy in Cleveland, the only program in Ohio where she could gain admission as a woman. She received her medical degree in 1860, the only woman in her class.

== Career ==
After earning a medical degree, Seaman opened a free dispensary from her home in Ohio, and experimented with combining electricity and hydropathy in her work. In 1867 she was co-founder with Myra King Merrick of the Cleveland Homeopathic College and Hospital for Women. She was the college's first president.

== Personal life and legacy ==
Cleora Stevens married John Farmer Seaman in 1833. They had seven children. Cleora Stevens Seaman died in 1869, at the age of 55, at her daughter's home in Providence, Rhode Island.

Her daughter Lucy Seaman Bainbridge became a nurse in the American Civil War, and a temperance leader; she wrote about her mother's work in a 1921 journal article, "One of the Pioneer Women in Medicine". She also wrote about her mother in a memoir, Yesterdays (1924). Cleora Seaman's descendants include surgeon William Seaman Bainbridge (Lucy's son) and sociologist William Sims Bainbridge (Lucy's great-grandson).
