= Gamgee Tissue =

Surgical dressing

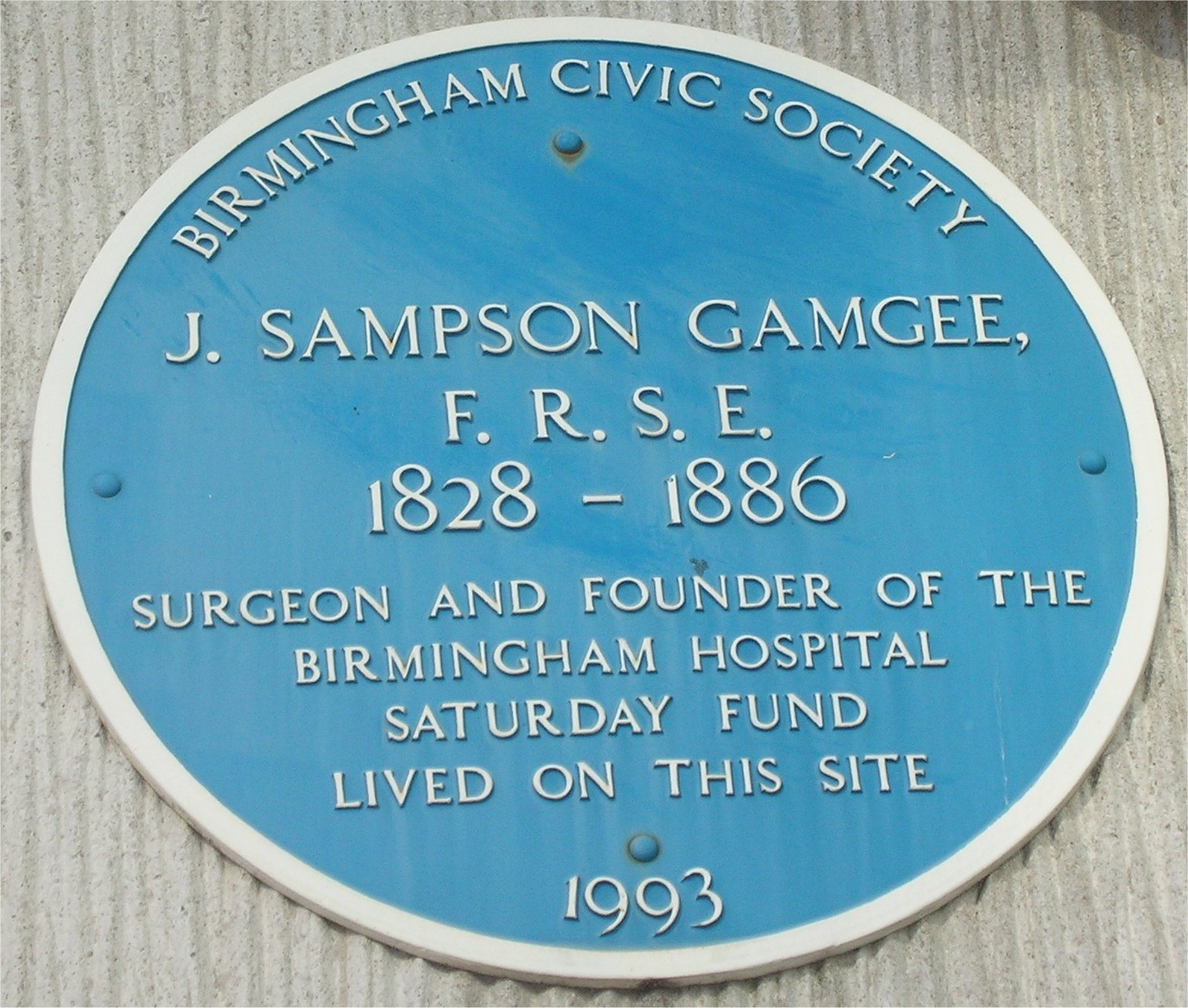
Plaque in Birmingham in honor of Sampson Gamgee.

Gamgee Tissue is a surgical dressing invented by Joseph Sampson Gamgee, a doctor in Birmingham, England, in 1880.

== Surgical dressing ==
Gamgee Tissue has a thick layer of absorbent cotton wool between two layers of absorbent gauze. It represents the first use of cotton wool in a medical context, and was a major advancement in the prevention of infection of surgical wounds. It is still the basis for many modern surgical dressings. The name has been a trademark of Robinson Healthcare (formerly Robinson and Sons Ltd of Chesterfield), based in Worksop, Nottinghamshire, since 1911.

== Tolkien ==
In Birmingham, "Gamgee" became the colloquial name for cotton wool, which led to the surname of Gaffer Gamgee and his son Sam in J. R. R. Tolkien's The Lord of the Rings. In a 1954 letter to the author Naomi Mitchison, who was checking the text of the novel for Tolkien, he addresses a question she had about the name:

Yes, Sam Gamgee is in a sense a relation of Dr. Gamgee, in that his name would not have taken that form, if I had not heard of 'Gamgee tissue'; there was I believe a Dr. Gamgee (no doubt of the kin) in Birmingham when I was a child. The name was any way always familiar to me. Gaffer Gamgee arose first: he was a legendary character to my children (based on a real-life gaffer, not of that name). But, as you will find explained, in this tale the name is a 'translation' of the real Hobbit name, derived from a village (devoted to rope-making) anglicized as Gamwich (pron. Gammidge), near Tighfield (see vol. II p. 217). Since Sam was close friends of the family of Cotton (another village-name), I was led astray into the Hobbit-like joke of spelling Gamwichy [as] Gamgee, though I do not think that in actual Hobbit-dialect the joke really arose.

— J.R.R. Tolkien

== Sources ==
- Carpenter, Humphrey, ed. (2023) [1981]. The Letters of J. R. R. Tolkien: Revised and Expanded Edition. New York: HarperCollins. ISBN 978-0-35-865298-4.
