= Theodore Debs =

American political activist (1864–1945)

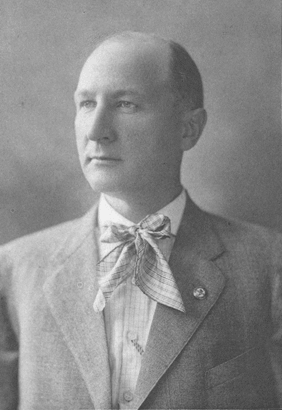
- Debs sometime after 1890
- Born: August 20, 1864; Terre Haute, Indiana, U.S.
- Died: April 13, 1945 (aged 80)
- Resting place: Highland Lawn Cemetery
- Occupation: Political activist
- Years active: 1880s–1945
- Political party: Socialist Party of America (after 1901); Social Democratic Party of America (1898–1901)
- Spouse: Gertrude B Toy (m. 1890)
- Children: 1
- Relatives: Eugene V. Debs (brother)

Theodore Debs (August 20, 1864 – April 13, 1945) was an American socialist and political activist. Debs is best remembered as the personal secretary and political confidant of his older brother, socialist orator and journalist Eugene V. Debs. A political actor in his own right, the younger Debs was the executive secretary of the Social Democratic Party of America with headquarters in Chicago from its foundation in 1898 until its dissolution through merger into the Socialist Party of America in August 1901.

== Early life ==
Theodore Debs was born August 20, 1864, in Terre Haute, Indiana.

His parents, Jean Daniel Debs and Marguerite Bettrich Debs, were ethnic French immigrants from Colmar, Alsace, France, having arrived in the United States in 1849. The Debs paterfamilias was the Protestant heir to a factory who broke with his family after falling in love with Marguerite, a Catholic employee of the firm. Well educated and trained as a factory manager, the estranged Jean Daniel had received a financial payout rather than the factory upon his father's death and had departed for a new life in America. He was relieved of his fortune en route by a con man and had been forced to take a series of physical jobs to make ends meet, finally saving a small nest egg and establishing a grocery store in 1855.

Theodore was the youngest of six surviving children and the second surviving son of Jean Daniel and Marguerite, known to family members as "Dandy" and "Daisy." From a young age he idolized his older brother, the charismatic and eloquent Eugene, nine years his senior, carrying on correspondence with him when he was away and joining him in literary and social activities when he was at home.

== Career ==
Theodore began his working career as an office assistant helping with the production of Locomotive Firemen's Magazine, a monthly edited by his brother.

When Eugene became a professional functionary with the Brotherhood of Locomotive Firemen (B of LF) in the early 1880s, serving as secretary-treasurer of the organization as well as editor of its monthly magazine, the young Theodore joined him as a general office worker, assisting with the production and mailing of magazines.

By the late 1880s, Theodore was working full time as Gene's personal secretary for the B of LF, maintaining an office in the business section of Terre Haute. As the union's chief functionary, Gene Debs received a torrent of correspondence each day, dictating an endless stream of reply mail to Theodore, who quickly gained proficiency as a typist. The brothers would remain close friends and co-workers for the rest of Gene's life. In the words of one biographer:

"For more than forty years, when Gene felt the need of long-visioned counsel, undying devotion, a service sacrificial, tender, selfless, he turned to Theodore. Never did a Damon love a Pythias more deeply than these two loved each other. The unassuming, sweet-tempered Theodore, perfectly willing to march into the fires of any hell for Gene's sake, was the ideal foil for Gene's more volatile temperament. A few drawled words from Theodore, ...and Gene would stop short on some headlong course and say quietly, 'You're right, Theodore. By God, you've got that right."

In 1892, Eugene V. Debs resigned as secretary-treasurer of the B of LF to establish a new industrial union, the American Railway Union (ARU). He was persuaded to remain on as editor of Locomotive Firemen's Magazine, a task which kept Theodore occupied. Debs also launched a new commercial venture, Debs Publishing Company, specializing in books for railway workers, with Theodore handling the correspondence and order fulfillment associated with this project. The brothers were separated for a time, with the ARU launching in 1893 with headquarters in Chicago, while Theodore remained in Terre Haute to look after publishing operations there.

Theodore was drafted into service on behalf of the ARU, however, traveling with President Gene and Vice President George W. Howard to St. Paul, Minnesota, in April 1894 to end a strike of ARU workers on the Great Northern Railroad through compulsory arbitration. In conjunction with this strike, Theodore seems to have served as consigliere and personal secretary to his brother rather than participating directly in negotiations.

=== Political activism ===
Theodore Debs (left) taking dictation from his brother Eugene V. Debs aboard the 1908 Red Special campaign train.

"His brother Eugene was sentenced to a six-month jail term for contempt of court for violating an anti-strike injunction in connection with the Pullman Strike of 1894, serving his sentence in 1895. A stenographer was hired by the union to assist Debs with correspondence; Theodore remained in Terre Haute. Gene emerged from jail a prominent and controversial public figure – a beloved icon and martyr to many. The American Railway Union was essentially bankrupted and driven underground by the costly prosecution, jailing of its national leaders, and blacklisting of its rank and file members. Its effectiveness as a trade union was dramatically attenuated".

On January 1, 1897, Eugene Debs publicly proclaimed himself a socialist in a statement to the press. Later that year, at a convention bringing together the handful of remaining dedicated adherents to the organization, the ARU was terminated and a new organization established in its place – the Social Democracy of America (SDA).

== Personal life and death ==
On June 25, 1890, Debs married Gertrude B Toy in Denver, Colorado. The couple had one daughter named Marguerite (1894–1987).

Debs died at age 80 on April 13, 1945, in Terre Haute, Indiana. He was buried at Highland Lawn Cemetery.

== Works ==
- Sidelights: Incidents in the Life of Eugene V. Debs. Terre Haute, IN: Eugene V. Debs Foundation, 1973.
