= William Seaman Bainbridge =

American surgeon and gynecologist

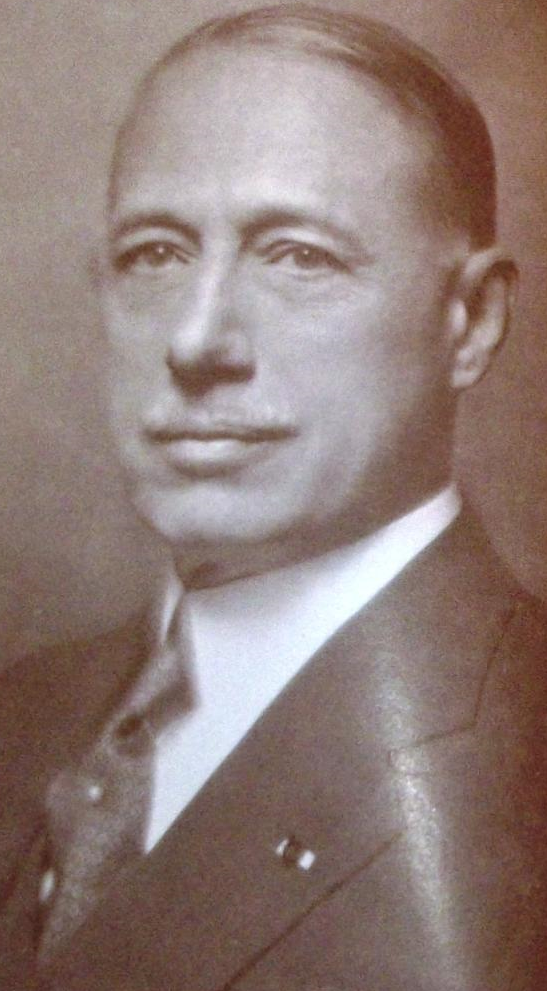
- Born: February 17, 1870; Providence, Rhode Island
- Died: September 22, 1947 (aged 77); Danbury, Connecticut
- Occupations: Surgeon, gynecologist
- Relatives: Cleora Augusta Stevens Seaman (grandmother); William Sims Bainbridge (grandson)

William Seaman Bainbridge (February 17, 1870 – September 22, 1947) was an American surgeon and gynecologist. He served as a naval physician in the United States Navy and was co-founder of the International Committee of Military Medicine (ICMM) located in Liège.

== Life ==
Bainbridge was born in Providence, Rhode Island, as son of the clergyman and scholar William Seaman Bainbridge, and his wife Elizabeth (Seaman) Bainbridge, a missionary and author. Bainbridge primarily visited the grammar school of the Brown University and thenceforward his family moved to Brooklyn, he visited a private school. A part of his childhood he also spent with his parents in Japan.

In his youth he enlisted in the cadet corps of the 13th Regiment of the National Guard of the United States, became corporal and visited Mohegan Lake Military Academy in Peekskill, New York. In his wish to become a surgeon, he was influenced and supported by Eliza Maria Mosher, who introduced him to Jay Webber Seaver, a pioneer of anthropometry. Bainbridge studied at the Shurtleff College, and finished his studies at the Washington & Jefferson College with a Master of Science degree. Afterwards he studied at the College of Physicians and Surgeons of New York, where he graduated as doctor of medicine in 1896. During the Spanish–American War, he served as a volunteer in the VII Army Corps under General Fitzhugh Lee. Afterwards he served at the NewYork–Presbyterian Hospital and at the Sloane Hospital for Women. In June 1907 he became doctor of the Western University of Pennsylvania (which changed its name to the University of Pittsburgh the following year). Also in 1907 he was honorary president of the first international congress for the study of tumors and cancers in Heidelberg. He taught gynaecology at the New York Post-Graduate Medical School and Hospital and gynaecology and surgery at the New York Polyclinic Medical School and Hospital, and was consulting surgeon and gynecologist of several national and international hospitals.

During his military time he met the Belgian Colonel (MC) Jules Voncken at the 28th Congress of the Association of Military Surgeons of the United States (AMSUS) in 1920, where they had the idea of founding an international association of military services. Due to this idea the permanent committee of International Congresses of Military Medicine and Pharmacy (ICMPM) was founded on May 21, 1952, which was renamed in 1990. A view years later he became Surgeon General of the American Boys' Brigade in the rank of brigadier general and afterwards assistant surgeon of the US Naval Reserve.

Bainbridge was a member of the Military Order of Foreign Wars and served as its commander general from 1926 to 1932.

Bainbridge was member of the Phi Delta Epsilon fraternity, of the American Medical Association and of several physicians' association of New York. He held several honorary memberships and honorary professorships.

== Personal life ==
Bainbridge was married to June (née Wheeler), and had at least one child. His daughter, Barbara, married Angus McIntosh in 1939; McIntosh would go on to become a distinguished Scottish scholar. He died in Danbury, Connecticut.

== Selected publications ==
- The Enzyme Treatment for Cancer (1909)
- The Cancer Problem (1918)
