= Barrett Seaman =

American writer

Barrett Seaman is the co-author of Going For Broke: The Chrysler Story (Doubleday, 1981), together with Michael Moritz, and the author of Binge: Campus Life in an Age of Disconnection and Excess. It was published in 2005 by Wiley. Seaman is a former Time magazine correspondent, White House correspondent and editor. He is a graduate and charter trustee of Hamilton College in Clinton, New York. He is a founding director of Choose Responsibility, a non-profit organization dedicated to reforming the nation's drinking age laws and was its president for several years Since 2010, he has been a writer and editor for The Hudson Independent, a news portal covering the Westchester County rivertown villages of the lower Hudson Valley.
