= Tanya Seaman =

American environmentalist (1967–2022)

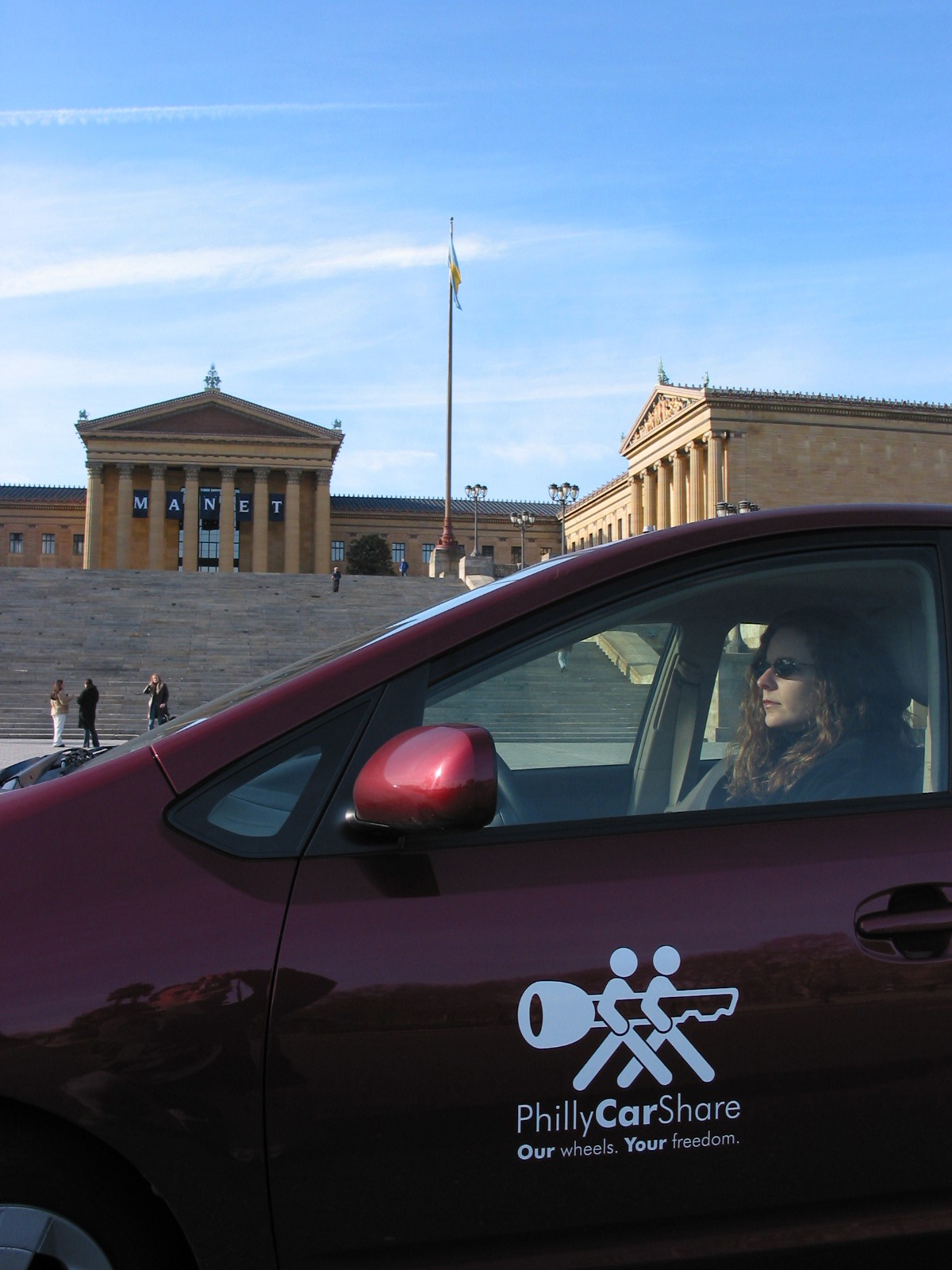
- Seaman in a PhillyCarShare Prius in front of the Art Museum steps in Philadelphia
- Born: May 18, 1967; Menlo Park, California, US
- Died: March 17, 2022; Philadelphia, Pennsylvania, US
- Education: BS, UC Davis; Masters, UPenn
- Employer: PhillyCarShare

Tanya Seaman was an American environmentalist and the co-founder and past executive director of PhillyCarShare. Seaman was born in Menlo Park, California to Lynn and Elisabeth Seaman. She died on March 17, 2022, of metastatic breast cancer.

== Environmentalism ==
On November 7, 2002, Seaman helped launch PhillyCarShare, a non-profit carsharing organization in Philadelphia, Pennsylvania. PhillyCarShare reached 55,000 users by 2008. Seaman helped develop the program with the City of Philadelphia to use PhillyCarShare cars as fleet vehicles for city workers.

She advocated for stronger municipal climate policies and improved public transportation options, including safe infrastructure for cyclists and pedestrians.

Her leadership earned her recognition as one of the Philadelphia Business Journal's "40 Under 40" to watch in the city of Philadelphia.

== Background ==
Seaman held a bachelor's degree in design from the University of California, Davis. After working in the field of architecture for several years, she left her home state of California to earn a Masters in City and Regional Planning at the University of Pennsylvania. Seaman did not own a car and ate a plant-based diet as part of her advocation for a sustainable life.
