= World Veterinary Association =

International Veterinary organization

The World Veterinary Association (WVA) is a federation representing more than eighty veterinary medical associations around the world. Its objective is to promote animal health and welfare and the realisation that animals and man live interconnected lives. It works on behalf of its member organisations with the World Health Organization, the Food and Agriculture Organization, the World Organisation for Animal Health and others to further the interests of animals, humans and the environment we all live in.

== History ==
Dr John Gamgee, Professor of Anatomy and Physiology at the Dick Veterinary College, Edinburgh invited other veterinary academics and veterinarians from Europe to a meeting at Hamburg, Germany in July 1863. This later became known as the World Veterinary Congress and was attended by 103 veterinarians from ten countries. The objective of the meeting was to coordinate the response to rinderpest and other epizootic diseases. At the sixth such congress in Budapest, Hungary in 1906, a permanent committee was set up to provide an organisational link between the congresses, and at the sixteenth congress in Madrid, Spain, in 1959, it was determined to form the World Veterinary Association (WVA). At the same congress, a decision was taken to also set up the International Association of Small Animal Specialists, now known as the World Small Animal Veterinary Association (WSAVA), for organisations representing small animal practitioners, and this had its first meeting two years later in London. By the twenty-fifth congress in Yokohama, Japan, in 1995, there were over ten thousand participants representing 82 countries.

== Mission ==
The WVA mission is "to assure and promote animal health and welfare and public health globally, through developing and advancing veterinary medicine, the veterinary profession as well as public and private veterinary services."

== Activities ==
The WVA holds a congress in different parts of the world every two years. It has an online library providing access to information on veterinary topics, research, reports and other WVA-related material. It publishes policy papers on the most important global veterinary issues. It publishes a newsletter and provides an online education portal.
