= Birmingham Hospital Saturday Fund =

UK non-profit organisation

The Birmingham Hospital Saturday Fund, now more commonly known as BHSF, was founded in 1873 to raise money for hospitals in Birmingham, England.

== Sunday Fund ==
Unlike the General Hospital, which was funded by concerts of the Birmingham Triennial Music Festivals, the Queen's Hospital had no regular large-scale funding. There was a "subscription of artisans" in 1847 and fetes in Aston Hall in 1856 and 1857. In 1859 the rector of St Martin in the Bull Ring started the Hospital Sunday Fund with church collections donated to Queen's Hospital and other hospitals.

As the out-patient facilities at Queen's were grossly inadequate, Sampson Gamgee, one of its surgeons, instigated the construction of a new out-patients wing and suggested engaging the help of the working classes in raising funds. At a meeting in Birmingham Town Hall in January 1869, chaired by George Dawson, Gamgee's suggestion was put forward and accepted. An amount of £3,500 was raised in 1871. The foundation stone was laid on 4 December 1871. The original fund was then disbanded in 1872. The wing cost £10,000 and was formally opened on 7 November 1873.

== Saturday Fund ==
On 6 January 1873 Sampson Gamgee raised the suggestion that "everyone should work overtime for the hospitals on a particular annual Saturday afternoon, to be called 'Hospital Saturday'". This new scheme called the Birmingham Hospital Saturday Fund was inaugurated on 15 March 1873 with John Skirrow Wright as Chair and Sampson Gamgee as Honorary Secretary, and was the first British scheme for raising money for all voluntary hospitals in an area. By 1879 the collection had dwindled and it was decided to replace them with a fixed weekly contribution of 1d. On 29 December 1891 the fund was incorporated as a limited non-profit company and was able to hold property, and in 1892 Tyn-y-coed, a stone house on a 33-acre (130,000 m^{2}) site near Llandudno in North Wales, opened as a convalescent home after its purchase price was donated by two Birmingham sisters, Henrietta and Sarah Stokes. Further homes were opened around the country.

In 1895 the BHSF started an ambulance service with four custom-designed cycle ambulances, based on a stretcher held between two bicycles. These were low cost devices which could be kept at police stations around the city and did not need assigned staff or horses.

The period after the 1960s saw a merger of similar funds around the country and later, in 2001, the merger of the Hull-based The Health Scheme (THS) with BHSF.

On the first Saturday, 15 March 1873, the amount raised was £4,700 from a population of 355,000, an average of 2 ^{3}/_{4}d. per head. This figure had increased to £400,000 by 1938. In addition to donations to the Queen's, General, Children's, Women's, Eye, and Dental hospitals, the fund implemented convalescent homes around Britain and an ambulance service. Today it continues as a national non-profit health insurance service.
