= Glaciarium =

Former ice skating rink in London, England

Coordinates: 51.4837°N 0.1767°W

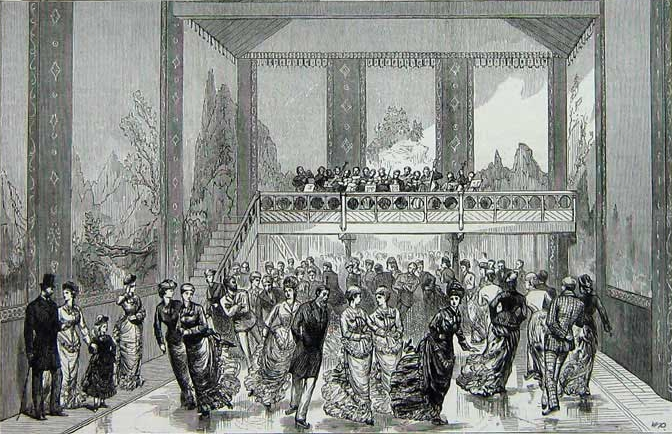
Interior of the Glaciarium in 1876

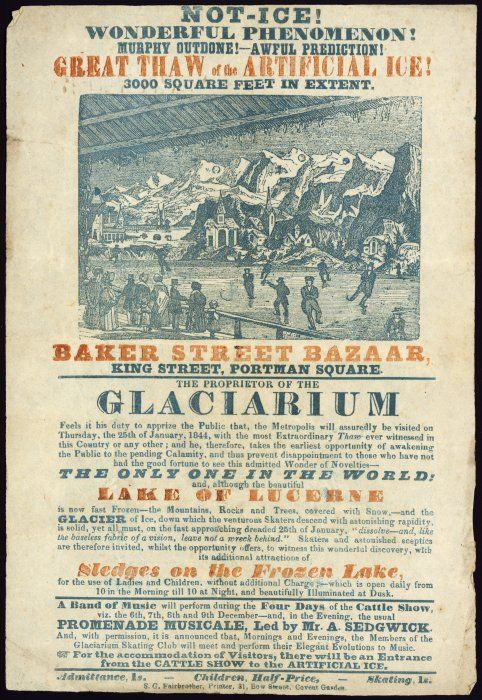
An 1844 poster for the Glaciarium

The Glaciarium located in London, England was the name of an early indoor artificial ice skating rink, and later the world's first mechanically frozen ice rink.

== Indoor artificial ice rinks of Henry Kirk ==
Henry Kirk used an artificial surface made from a mixture of pig lard, salt and copper sulphate to open a small rink (6 by 12 feet) in Dorset Square, Marylebone, in December 1841, and again in Regent's Park in July 1842. He then built the Glaciarium, which covered "a surface of 3,000 feet". Kirk's Glaciarium was decorated with scenery of the Alps on the walls. The Glaciarium first opened either in 1843 or in January 1844 at Covent Garden, before moving to a permanent location on Portman Square, Baker Street. An item in the 8 June 1844 issue of Littell's Living Age headed "The Glaciarium" reported:

This establishment, which has been removed to Grafton street East' Tottenham-court-road [sic], was opened on Monday afternoon. The area of artificial ice is extremely convenient for such as may be desirous of engaging in the graceful and manly pastime of skating.

— The Glaciarium, Littell's Living Age, Volume 1, No. 4

The surface caused an offputting smell that led to the closure of the Glaciarium before the end of 1844.

== Indoor ice rinks of John Gamgee ==
A later rink was opened by John Gamgee in a tent in a small building just off the Kings Road in Chelsea, London, on 7 January 1876, using water ice. In March, it moved to a permanent venue at 379 Kings Road, where a rink measuring 40 by 24 feet was established. This rink is widely considered the world's first ice rink.

Gamgee's rink was based on a concrete surface, with layers of earth, cow hair, tar and timber planks. Atop these were laid oval copper pipes carrying a solution of glycerine with ether, nitrogen peroxide, and water. The pipes were covered by water and the solution was pumped through, freezing the water into ice. Gamgee had discovered the process while attempting to develop a method to freeze meat for import from Australia and New Zealand, and had patented it as early as 1870.

Gamgee operated the rink on a membership-only basis and attempted to attract a wealthy clientele, experienced in open-air ice skating during winters in the Alps. He installed an orchestra gallery, which could also be used by spectators, and decorated the walls with views of the Swiss Alps.

The rink initially proved a success, and Gamgee opened two further rinks later in the year: at Rusholme in Manchester and the "Floating Glaciarium" at Charing Cross in London, this last significantly larger at 115 by 25 feet. However, the process was expensive, and mists rising from the ice deterred customers, forcing Gamgee to close the Glaciarium by the end of the year, and all his rinks had shut by mid-1878. However, the Southport Glaciarium opened in 1879, using Gamgee's method.

== See also ==
- St. Nicholas Rink
