= Arthur Gamgee =

British biochemist

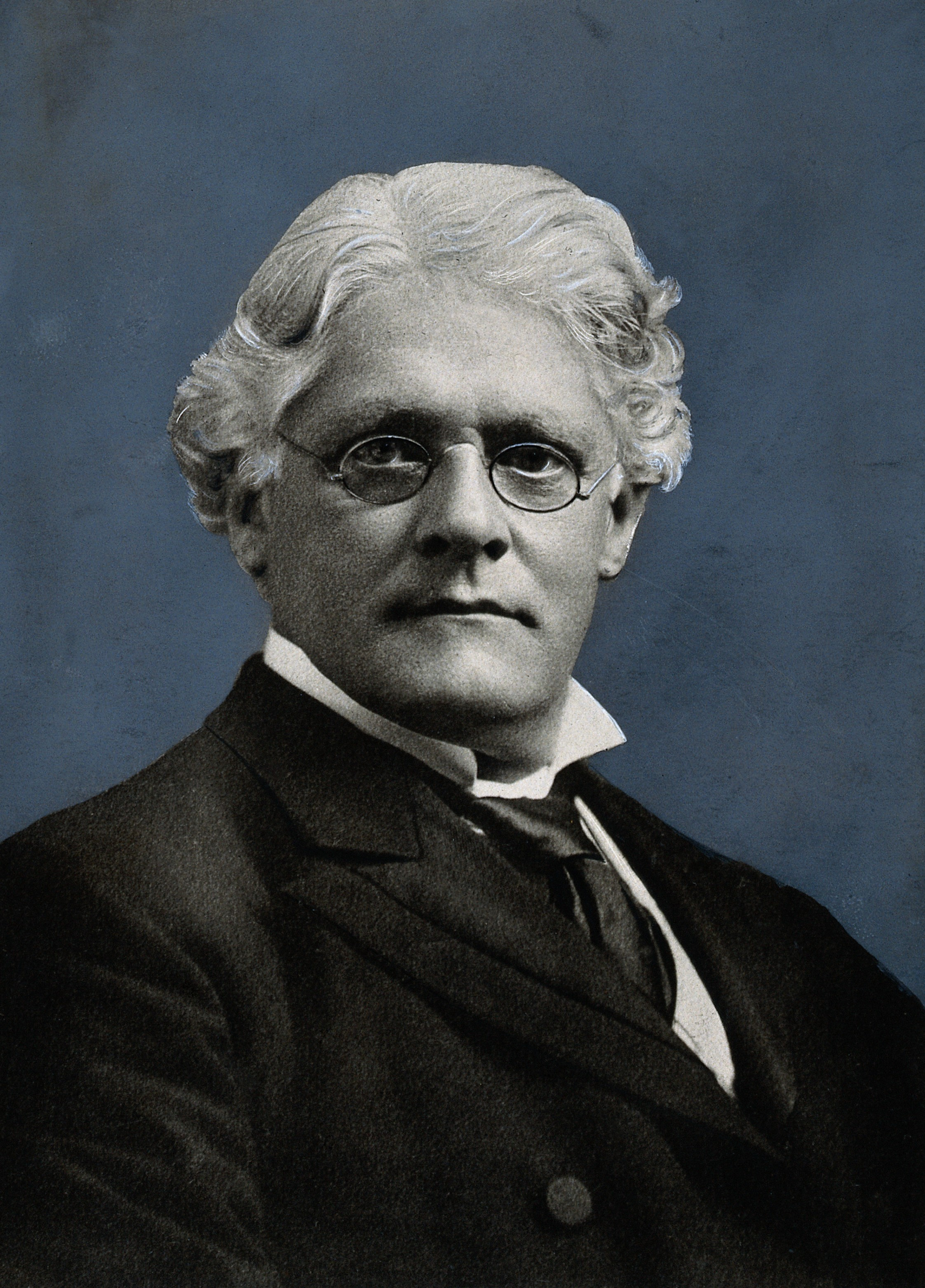
- Born: 11 October 1841; Florence, Grand Duchy of Tuscany
- Died: 29 May 1909 (aged 67); Paris, France
- Resting place: Arnos Vale Cemetery, Bristol, England; 51.435°N 2.565°W
- Education: University College School; University of Edinburgh
- Occupation: Physiologist
- Known for: Founder of the Edinburgh Veterinary Review
- Title: MD Edin. (1862); MRCP Edin. (1871); FRCP Edin. (1872); FRS (1872); Brackenbury Professor of Physiology (1873); President of the biological section of the British Association (1882); Fullerian Professor of Physiology (1884–1886); MRCP Lond. (1885); FRCP Lond. (1896)
- Spouse: Mary Louisa Clark (1875–1909)
- Children: One son, two daughters
- Parent(s): Joseph Gamgee; Mary Ann West
- Relatives: John Gamgee (brother); Joseph Sampson Gamgee (brother); D'Arcy Thompson (nephew)

Prof Arthur Gamgee FRS FRSE (11 October 1841 – 29 May 1909) was a British biochemist.

== Life ==
Arthur Gamgee was the youngest of eight children of Joseph Gamgee, an Edinburgh-born veterinarian and pathologist and his wife Mary Ann West. He was born in Florence, Grand Duchy of Tuscany, where his father had a practice nearby in Livorno. His family moved to the United Kingdom when he was fourteen years old. He was educated at University College School in London and at the University of Edinburgh, graduating with an MD in 1862. For his thesis, Contributions to the Chemistry and Physiology of Foetal Nutrition, he was awarded a gold medal. He did postgraduate studies in both Heidelberg and Leipzig in Germany.

In 1867 he was elected a Fellow of the Royal Society of Edinburgh his proposer being Sir Andrew Douglas Maclagan.

He taught in the Edinburgh Extramural School of Medicine, giving lectures on physiology and histology at Surgeon's Hall. Between 1863 and 1869 he was Physician to the Royal Hospital for Sick Children. In 1873 he was appointed Professor of Physiology at the Royal Manchester School of Medicine. He was also Physician to the Manchester Hospital for Consumption. In 1872 he was elected a Fellow of the Royal Society and delivered its Croonian Lecture in 1902. Manuscript notes of Gamgee's physiology lectures from both Edinburgh and Manchester survive as part of the Manchester Medical Manuscripts Collection held by special collections at the University of Manchester with the reference MMM/19/1.

From 1884 to 1886 he was Fullerian Professor of Physiology and Comparative Anatomy at the Royal Institution of Great Britain; he did not serve the full three years of the Fullerian appointment because he resigned his chair in 1886 to take up private practice. He was also the author of A Text-book of the Physiological Chemistry of the Animal Body: including an account of the chemical changes occurring in disease, published in 1880.

He was awarded the honorary degree Doctor of Laws (LL.D.) from the University of Edinburgh in 1903.

Arthur Gamgee was fluent in French, German, and Italian.

On 29 March 1909, he died of pneumonia during a visit to Paris. He was buried in the family vault in Arnos Vale Cemetery, Bristol.

== Family ==
He married Mary Louisa Clark in 1875.

He was the brother of John Gamgee and Joseph Sampson Gamgee and uncle of D'Arcy Thompson.

Academic offices
| Preceded by John Gray McKendrick | Fullerian Professor of Physiology; 1884–1886 | Succeeded by George John Romanes |
