= Sampson Gamgee =

English surgeon

Joseph Gamgee FRSE
- Born: 17 April 1828; Livorno, Grand Duchy of Tuscany
- Died: 18 September 1886 (aged 58); Birmingham, England
- Occupation: Surgeon
- Known for: Founding the Birmingham Hospital Saturday Fund Inventing Gamgee Tissue
- Relatives: John Gamgee (brother); Arthur Gamgee (brother); D'Arcy Wentworth Thompson, (nephew)

Joseph Sampson Gamgee (17 April 1828 – 18 September 1886) was a surgeon at the Queen's Hospital (later the General Hospital) in Birmingham, England. He pioneered aseptic surgery (having once shared lodgings with Joseph Lister), and, in 1880 invented Gamgee Tissue, an absorbent cotton wool and gauze surgical dressing.

== Life ==
He was born in Livorno, Grand Duchy of Tuscany, where his father, Joseph Gamgee (1801–1895), was a veterinary surgeon; Sampson's mother and Joseph's wife was Mary Ann West (1799–1873). He was the sibling of John Gamgee, inventor and Professor of Anatomy and Physiology at Dick Veterinary College, Edinburgh and Arthur Gamgee. Sampson studied at the Royal Veterinary College, London. While a veterinary student, he was invited to attend lectures at University College Hospital and his work was so good that he was persuaded to become a student there. His classmate was Joseph Lister with whom he shared lodgings and considered him a close friend.

He obtained a post as House Surgeon at University College Hospital in London. He then served as a surgeon in the British-Italian Legion during the Crimean War. On his return in 1857 he took on the post of Surgeon at Queen's Hospital in Birmingham.

In 1868 he was elected a Fellow of the Royal Society of Edinburgh his proposer being Sir James Young Simpson.

In 1873 he founded the Birmingham Hospital Saturday Fund which raised money for various hospitals in Birmingham from overtime earnings given by workers on nominated Hospital Saturdays. It was the first such fund to raise money in this way for multiple hospitals. Sampson was also the first president of the Birmingham Medical Institute.

In 1881 he retired from active hospital life due to a Haematuria infection. In 1886 his health further worsened during a trip to Dartmouth where he fell fracturing his right femur at its head. He died of Bright's disease in Birmingham on 18 September 1886.

== Publications ==
- Researches in Pathological Anatomy and Clinical Surgery (1856)
- On the Treatment of Fractures of the Limbs (1871)
- A Lecture on Ovariotomy (1871)
- On the Treatment of Wounds and Fractures (1883)

== Legacy ==
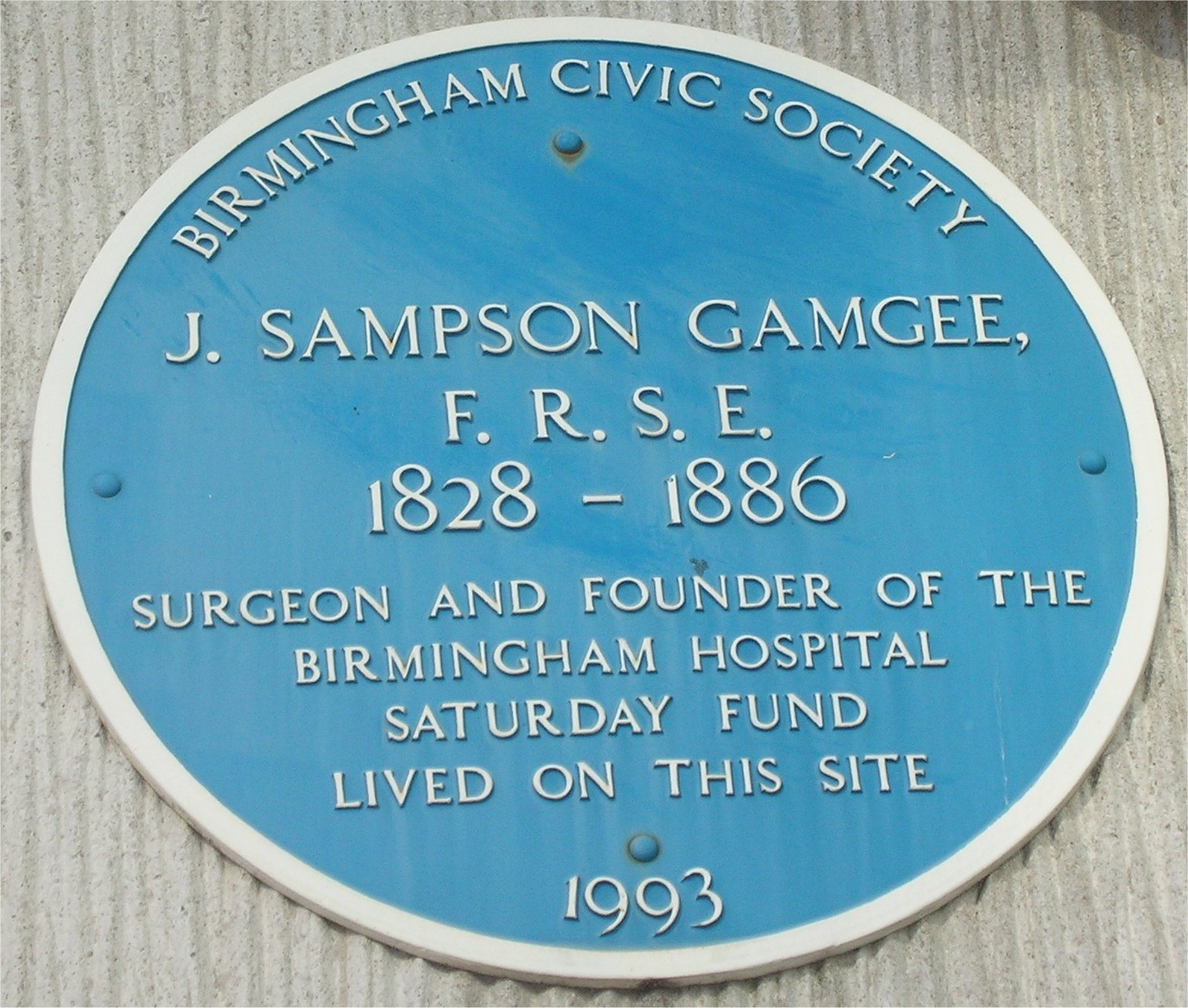
Blue plaque on the Birmingham Repertory Theatre

He gave his name (indirectly, via the tissue) to the hobbit Sam Gamgee in J. R. R. Tolkien's The Lord of the Rings. There is a blue plaque commemorating him on the Birmingham Repertory Theatre and a library is dedicated to him in the Birmingham Medical Institute.

== Family ==
He married Marion Parker, daughter of an Edgbaston vet, in 1886. They had two sons and two daughters. One son, Leonard Parker Gamgee, was a surgeon in Birmingham and his nephew (son of his sister Fanny) was the biologist and classicist D'Arcy Wentworth Thompson.
