= Jules Voncken =

Surgeon-General

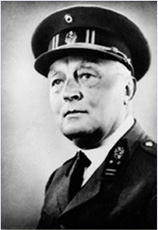
Official photograph of Jules Voncken

Jules Voncken (1887–June 1975) was Surgeon-General of the Belgian Medical Component with the rank Major General (Medical Corps). He was also co-founder and general secretary of the International Committee of Military Medicine (ICMM) located in Liège.

== Life ==
In 1920, when he had the rank of a Colonel (MC), Vonken met USN Captain (MC) William Seaman Bainbridge at the 28th Congress of the Association of Military Surgeons of the United States (AMSUS), where they had the idea of founding an international association of military services. Due to this idea the permanent committee of International Congresses of Military Medicine and Pharmacy (ICMPM) was founded on 21 May 1952, which was renamed in 1990. Voncken became the first general secretary of the institution, and held the chair until his death. After 1937 he was invited expert member of the International Red Cross at the revision works of the 1929 Geneva Convention.

Today's Jules-Voncken-Preis of the ICMM is named in honor of him.
