= John Gamgee =

British veterinarian and inventor

John Gamgee (1831–1894) was a British veterinarian and inventor. He specialised in the contagious diseases of larger animals: primarily cattle and horses.

== Life ==
Gamgee was born in 1831 in Florence, Grand Duchy of Tuscany, Italy, the son of Joseph Gamgee (1801–1895), a Scottish veterinarian formerly living in Essex, and his wife, Mary Ann West (1799–1873). John was a sibling of Arthur Gamgee, a biochemist, and Dr Sampson Gamgee, a surgeon and pioneer of aseptic surgery. Gamgee was educated at a number of institutions across Italy, Germany and Switzerland before graduating from the Royal Veterinary College in London in 1852.

In 1855 he returned to London from the continent to lecture in veterinary medicine and surgery at Camden Hall in Camden Town. He was then living at 16 Upper Woburn Place. Following the death of John Barlow he was invited by William Dick to come to Edinburgh to lecture in animal anatomy and physiology. In 1857 he set up his own rival college: the New Edinburgh Veterinary College on Drummond Street, initially with twenty students. In 1857 he appears living at 21 Dublin Street in the New Town. In the same year his father came from Italy (via London) and set up a horse infirmary at 206 Rose Street in the New Town.

Appointed by the Privy Council to study the problem of diseased meat being used for human consumption (especially in London), he identified the threat of rinderpest from imported Baltic cows, and other issues.

In 1863, Gamgee organized the first conference of what would evolve into the World Veterinary Association.

During a study trip to the USA to look at Texas fever in cattle he encountered and became fascinated by refrigeration. He was the developer of the Glaciarium, the world's first mechanically frozen ice rink in 1876. His investigations also led to the world's first refrigerated ships.

Gamgee later became involved promoting refrigeration technology. He developed what was purported to be a perpetual motion machine known as the Zeromoter. The Zeromoter was intended to use ammonia within a refrigeration system to power ships. The technology gained the support of US President James Garfield, before being debunked.
