= Myra K. Merrick =

American medical doctor (1825–1899)

Myra King Merrick (1825–11 November 1899) was the first female medical doctor in the US state of Ohio.

== Early life and education ==
Myra K. Merrick was born in 1825 in Hinckley, Leicestershire, England to mother Elizabeth née Ball and Richard King. She and her parents immigrated to Taunton, Massachusetts where she worked in a cotton mill. In 1841, Merrick moved to East Liverpool, Ohio. In 1848, she married Charles H. Merrick.

Merrick was inspired to pursue medicine as a career when her husband became ill and she took on the responsibility of his care. She attended Central Medical College in Rochester, New York and worked as a nurse at the Hydropathic Institute to gain more experience in the field of medicine prior to graduation. Merrick graduated on May 27, 1852.

== Early career in medicine ==
After Merrick graduated from medical school, she returned to Cleveland to be with her family and to start her career as a physician. Merrick became Cleveland's first female physician practicing homeopathic medicine and she had notable patients including John D. Rockefeller. By the 1850s, she had made a name for herself in Cleveland as a leading female physician. She did relocate to Lorain County during the Civil War to treat wounded soldiers before helping to establish the Cleveland Homeopathic College for Women in 1867.

In addition to being dedicated to medicine, Merrick was interested in furthering the rights of women. In 1869, Merrick became the president of the Cuyahoga County Woman Suffrage Association. Merrick was likely inspired to get involved in the women's suffrage movement due to the challenges she faced when pursuing a career in medicine.

== Cleveland Homeopathic Hospital College for Women ==
In the 1860s, the Western College of Homeopathic Medicine stopped admitting female students. In response to this, Merrick and Cleora O. Seaman formed the Cleveland Homeopathic Hospital College for Women. Merrick became an instructor at this school, which made her "the first woman medical college professor outside of the East Coast". She taught students about diseases of women and children, as well as obstetrics which were specialties snubbed by many male physicians at the time. Many prominent Cleveland female physicians graduated from this program: Sarah Marcus, Josephine Danforth Gillette, Kate Parsons, and Martha Canfield. These female physicians, Merrick's daughter-in-law Eliza Merrick, and Merrick became board members for the Children's Free Medical and Surgical Dispensary when it was founded in 1878. Impoverished women and children could receive care there, while female doctors who were often shunned from other hospitals could gain valuable medical experience. The dispensary would later become the Woman's General Hospital in 1912.
