= Cotton wool =

Cotton fibres refined into a fluffy absorbent

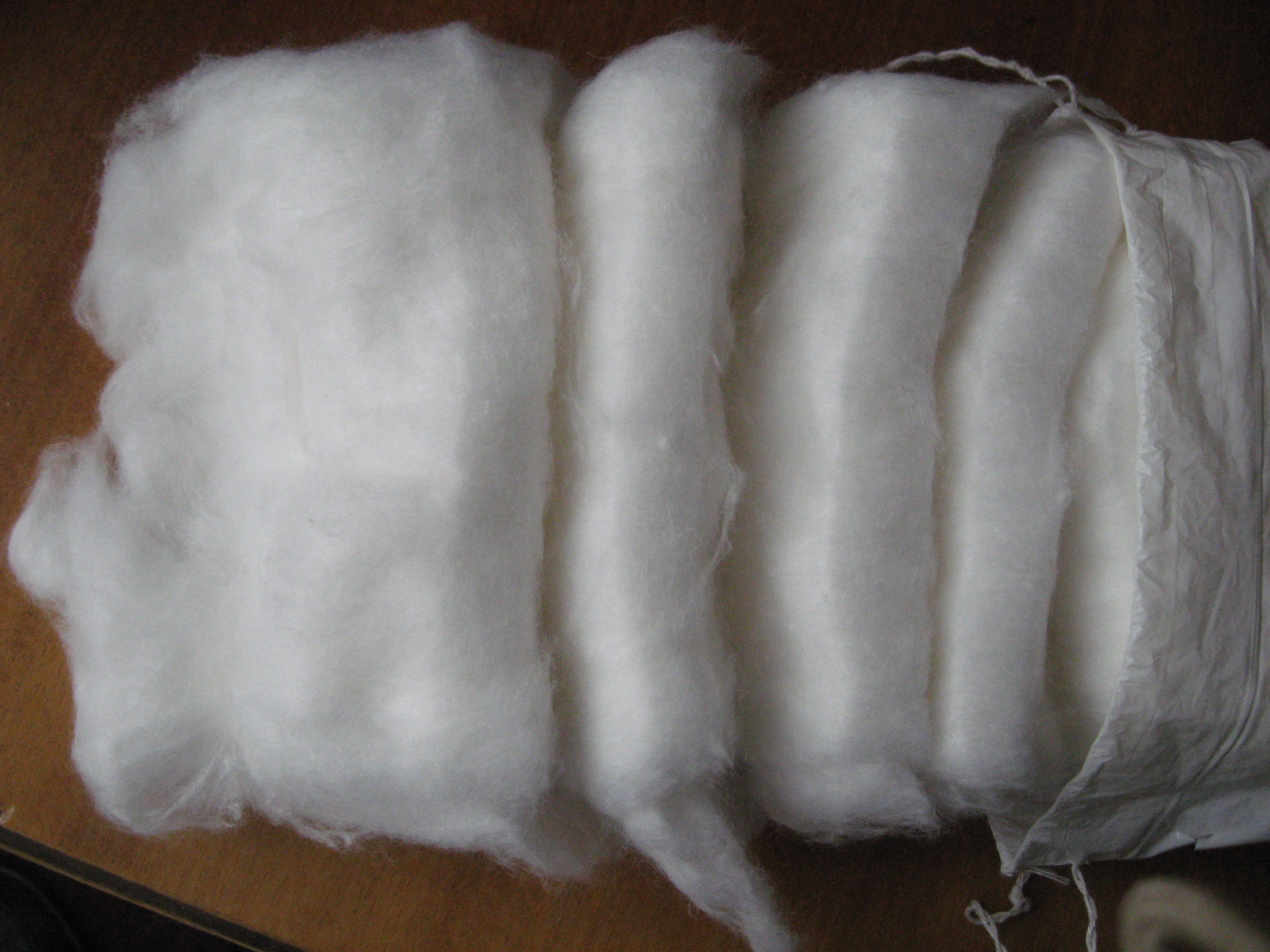
Cotton wool

Cotton wool consists of silky fibers taken from cotton plants in their raw state. Impurities, such as seeds, are removed and the cotton is then bleached using hydrogen peroxide or sodium hypochlorite and sterilized. It is also a refined product (absorbent cotton in U.S. usage) which has medical, cosmetic and many other practical uses.

The first medical use of cotton wool was by Joseph Sampson Gamgee at the Queen's Hospital (later the General Hospital) in Birmingham, England. In 1880, he invented Gamgee Tissue, consisting of cotton wool covered by absorbent gauze.

Despite the name, cotton wool is not actually wool at all. It is from the cotton plant. Most cotton comes from India, the United States, or China. Cotton plants prefer heavy soil to grow well.

== See also ==
- Calico Acts
