= D. Omer Seamon =

American painter

D. Omer "Salty" Seamon
- Salty Seamon in his studio
- Born: Denzil Omer Seamon; March 2, 1911; Gibson County, Indiana
- Died: 1997
- Known for: painting

D. Omer "Salty" Seamon (1911–1997) was an American painter known for his folksy watercolors and landscapes of Indiana and the Midwest. His work can be found in galleries and homes across the United States.

== Early life ==
He was born Denzil Omer Seamon in Gibson County, Indiana, to parents Louis and Estel Seamon. He began drawing at an early age, sketching pictures to send along with letters his parents sent to an older brother fighting in World War I.

Much of Seamon's training came experientially. Early jobs included trimming windows for a department store in Evansville, Indiana, and preparing posters for a dry goods store. In 1929 he worked in Minneapolis painting theater posters for Paramount Studios. During the Great Depression he returned to Terre Haute, Indiana, as art director for Thomson-Symon Co.

During World War II Seamon served over three years with a United States Army Special Service Unit. He spent this time in the Pacific, including Australia, New Guinea, the Philippines and Japan. During his service, he continued to make art, in particular painting of military and native life in the islands.

== Freelance work ==
"Autumn" watercolor, 1972, depicting a scene in Brown County, Indiana

After the war, Seamon devoted his time to becoming a full-time freelance artist. He and his wife Marjorie "Polly" Kress and stepson Edgar Mechling moved to a home near Rosedale, Indiana, where Seamon had a painting studio. He became well known in the Wabash Valley area. In addition to selling paintings directly to members of the community, Seamon annually created arts for the Forrest Sherer Agency Christmas cards. His work was even available on personal checks from Terre Haute First National Bank.

Seamon often painted the local people and places he saw around him, from covered bridges and rivers to specific locales including the Vigo County Courthouse, the Indiana Theatre and the Church of the Immaculate Conception, all in Vigo County, Indiana.

In 1980 Seamon was named a Sagamore of the Wabash by Indiana governor Otis Bowen. Rose-Hulman Institute of Technology has shown a particular appreciation for Seamon, granting him an honorary doctorate in 1979 and creating a collection of many of his works. Seamon died in 1997.
