= Samwise Gamgee =

Hobbit character in The Lord of the Rings

- Middle-earth character
- First appearance: The Lord of the Rings (1954–1955)

In-universe information
- Race: Hobbit
- Affiliation: Company of the Ring
- Spouse: Rosie Cotton

Samwise Gamgee (/ˈsæmˌwaɪz ˈɡæmˌdʒiː/, usually called Sam) (Westron: Banazîr Galbasi) is a fictional character in J. R. R. Tolkien's Middle-earth. A hobbit, Samwise is the chief supporting character of The Lord of the Rings, serving as the loyal companion of the protagonist Frodo Baggins. Sam is a member of the Company of the Ring, the group of nine charged with destroying the One Ring.

Sam was Frodo's gardener. He was drawn into Frodo's adventure while eavesdropping on a private conversation Frodo was having with the wizard Gandalf. Sam was Frodo's steadfast companion and servant, portrayed as both physically strong for his size and emotionally strong, often supporting Frodo through difficult parts of the journey and, at times, carrying Frodo when he was too weak to go on. Sam served as Ring-bearer for a short time when Frodo was captured by orcs; his emotional strength was again demonstrated when he willingly gave the Ring back to Frodo. Following the War of the Ring, Sam returned to the Shire and his role as a gardener, helping to replant the trees which had been destroyed while he was away. He was elected Mayor of the Shire for seven consecutive terms.

The name Gamgee derives from a local Birmingham name for cotton wool, from a surgical dressing invented by Sampson Gamgee; hence Sam's girlfriend Rosie is from the Cotton family. Scholars have remarked on the symbolism in Sam's story, which carries echoes of Christianity; for instance, his carrying of Frodo is reminiscent of Simon of Cyrene's carrying of Christ's cross. Tolkien considered Sam a hero of the story. Psychologists have seen Sam's quest as a psychological journey of love. Tolkien's biographers have noted the resemblance of Sam's relationship with Frodo to that of military servants to British Army officers in the First World War.

== Fictional biography ==
=== The War of the Ring ===
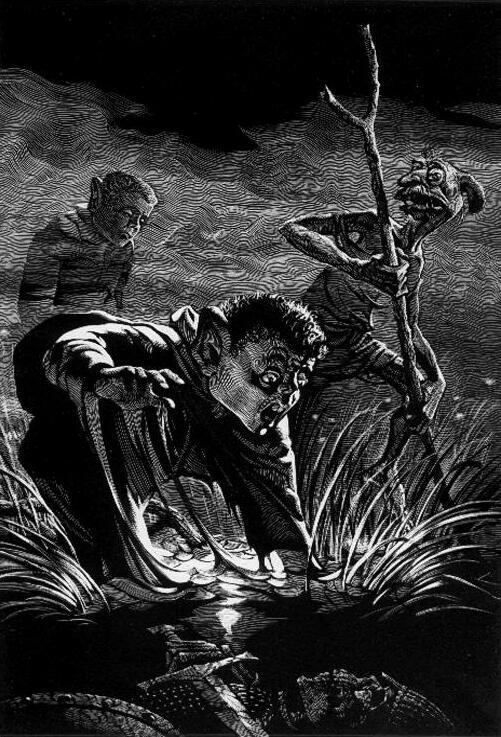
Frodo and Sam guided by Gollum through the Dead Marshes. Scraperboard illustration by Alexander Korotich, 1984

As told in The Lord of the Rings, Samwise Gamgee is Frodo Baggins's gardener, having inherited the position from his father, Hamfast "Gaffer" Gamgee, who was Bilbo Baggins's gardener. As "punishment" for eavesdropping on Gandalf's conversation with Frodo about the One Ring, Sam is made Frodo's first companion on his journey to Rivendell. (Note: Tolkien 1954a, book 1, ch. 2, "The Shadow of the Past") They are joined by Meriadoc Brandybuck and Peregrin Took, Frodo's cousins, travelling together to Rivendell. At the Council of Elrond there, Sam joins the Fellowship of the Ring. (Note: Tolkien 1954a, book 2, ch. 2, "The Council of Elrond") In the elvish land of Lothlórien, Galadriel gives Sam a small box of earth from her garden. (Note: Tolkien 1954a, book 2, ch. 8, "Farewell to Lórien")

When the Fellowship splits up at the Falls of Rauros, Sam insists on accompanying Frodo. (Note: Tolkien 1954a, book 2, ch. 10, "The Breaking of the Fellowship") Sam protects and cares for Frodo, who is growing weaker under the Ring's influence, as they move through the dangerous lands toward Mordor. Sam distrusts Gollum, who became their guide into Mordor, leading them through the Dead Marshes. (Note: Tolkien 1954, book 4, ch. 1, "The Taming of Sméagol") (Note: Tolkien 1954, book 4, ch. 2, "The Passage of the Marshes") His suspicions are confirmed in the mountain pass of Cirith Ungol, where Gollum betrays them to the giant spider Shelob. Shelob stings Frodo, and Sam drives her off. (Note: Tolkien 1954a, book 4, ch. 9, "Shelob's Lair") A band of orcs approaches; Sam chooses to leave the apparently dead Frodo and take the Ring himself, and briefly becomes the Ring-bearer. He is momentarily tempted by the Ring's promise of power, but does not succumb to it. (Note: Tolkien 1954a, book 4, ch. 10, "The Choices of Master Samwise") Sam then rescues Frodo (who had only been paralysed) from the Orcs who held him captive. Sam returns the ring to Frodo. (Note: Tolkien 1955, book 6, ch. 1, "The Tower of Cirith Ungol") The two journey through Mordor (Note: Tolkien 1955, book 6, ch. 2, "The Land of Shadow") and into Mount Doom. Sam carries Frodo on his back for some of the way. Gollum attacks Frodo and reclaims the Ring, only to destroy both it and himself by falling into one of the Cracks of Doom. (Note: Tolkien 1955, book 6, ch. 3, "Mount Doom")

=== The Scouring of the Shire ===
So Sam planted saplings in all the places where specially beautiful or beloved trees had been destroyed, and he put a grain of the precious dust in the soil at the root of each. He went up and down the Shire in this labour; but if he paid special attention to Hobbiton and Bywater no one blamed him. [...]

Spring surpassed his wildest hopes. His trees began to sprout and grow, as if time was in a hurry and wished to make one year do for twenty. In the Party Field a beautiful young sapling leaped up: it had silver bark and long leaves and burst into golden flowers in April. It was indeed a mallorn, and it was the wonder of the neighbourhood.

— The Lord of the Rings, book 6, ch. 9 "The Grey Havens"

The hobbits return home (Note: Tolkien 1955, book 6, ch. 7, "Homeward Bound") horrified to find the Shire under the control of "Sharkey" (the fallen wizard Saruman) and his ruffians who had wantonly felled trees and despoiled the villages; the hobbits defeat them at the Battle of Bywater and scour the Shire of all the ruffians and their works. (Note: Tolkien 1955, book 6, ch. 8, "The Scouring of the Shire") Sam travels the length and breadth of the Shire replanting trees, using the elf-queen Galadriel's gift of earth from her garden, and one seed of the elvish mallorn tree, which he plants at Hobbiton. The saplings grow at an astonishing rate. (Note: Tolkien 1955, book 6, ch. 9, "The Grey Havens")

=== In the Fourth Age ===
Sam marries Rosie Cotton and moves into Bag End with Frodo. The next year they have a daughter, Elanor, the first of their thirteen children. Frodo tells Sam that he (Frodo) and Bilbo will leave Middle-earth, along with Gandalf and most of the remaining High Elves, for the Undying Lands. Frodo gives Sam the estate of Bag End, and the Red Book of Westmarch for Sam to continue, hinting that Sam may also be allowed to travel into the West eventually. Sam returns to meet his family at Bag End, ending the story with the words "Well, I'm back."

The Appendices note that in the year 1427 of the Shire Reckoning, Sam was elected Mayor of the Shire for the first of seven consecutive seven-year terms. (Note: Tolkien 1955, Appendix B, "The Tale of Years", "Later Events Concerning the Members of the Fellowship of the Ring") His descendants took the surname Gardner in his honour. (Note: Tolkien 1955, Appendix C "Family Trees", "The Longfather-Tree of Master Samwise")

== Analysis ==
=== Christianity ===
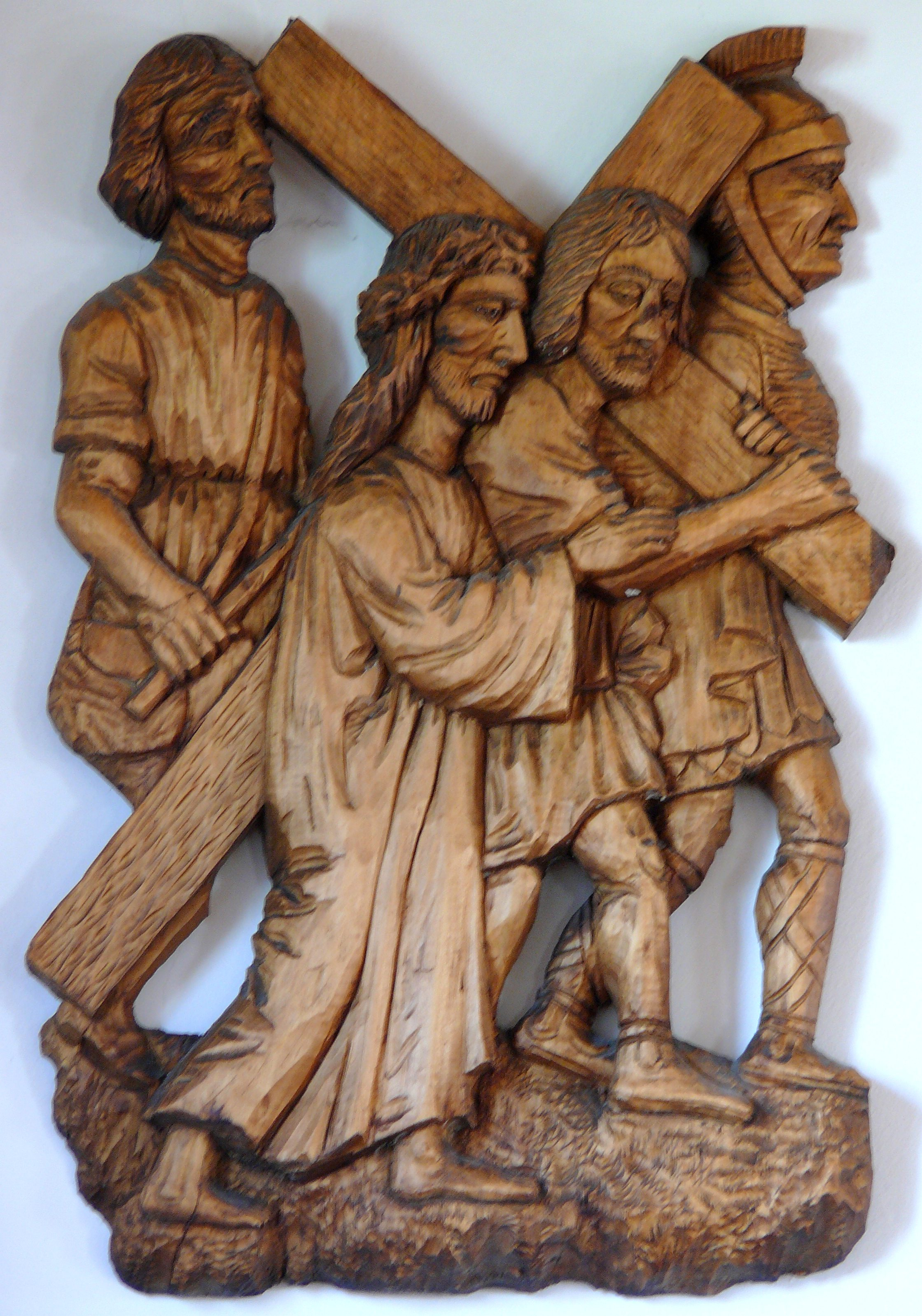
Frodo has been compared to Christ, and Sam, who carried Frodo on the way to Mount Doom, to Simon of Cyrene, who carried Christ's cross to Golgotha.

Tolkien intentionally avoided making Christianity explicit in his Middle-earth writings, choosing instead to allow "the story and the symbolism" to convey his meaning. (Note: Tolkien 1977, p. xii) Frodo finds the Ring a crushing weight, just as the cross was for Jesus. Sam, who carries Frodo up to Mount Doom, parallels Simon of Cyrene, who helps Jesus by carrying his cross to Golgotha. Sam gains prominence as he is willing to be unimportant in doing his duty, echoing the Christian emphasis on the humble. The ordeal of crossing Mordor, too, reflects the Christian theme of redemptive suffering.

=== Heroism ===
Tolkien called Sam the "chief hero" of the saga, adding: "I think the simple 'rustic' love of Sam and his Rosie (nowhere elaborated) is absolutely essential to the study of his (the chief hero's) character, and to the theme of the relation of ordinary life (breathing, eating, working, begetting) and quests, sacrifice, causes, and the 'longing for Elves', and sheer beauty." (Note: Carpenter 2023, letter 131 to Milton Waldman, 1951) Tolkien admired heroism out of loyalty and love, but despised arrogance, pride and wilfulness. The courage and loyalty displayed by Samwise Gamgee on his journey with Frodo is the kind of spirit that Tolkien praised in his essays on the Old English poem "The Battle of Maldon". Likewise, Sam's rejection of the Ring is a rejection of power, but also a "desire for renown which the defeat over Sauron will bring".

Tom Shippey notes Sam's courage, which among other things takes the form of "be[ing] 'cheerful' without any hope at all". Shippey comments that this may hardly appear sensible, but it "rings true", appearing in old soldiers' recollections of the First World War. He notes the etymology of "cheer", from Old French chair, meaning "face", commenting that "a stout pretence" is better than "sincere despair". Further, in the grimness of the Stairs of Cirith Ungol, he and Frodo imagine people "laughing at grief", something that Shippey calls Tolkien's "new model of courage".

=== Psychological journey ===
The Jungian clinical psychologist Robin Robertson describes Sam's quest as a psychological journey of love (for Frodo), where Frodo's quest is one of transcendence. Robertson writes that "Sam's is the simplest yet the most touching of all paths: his simple loyalty and love for Frodo make him the single person who never wavers in his task throughout the book." In his view, Sam always stays grounded in simple things like meals and the glory of a sunrise, while Sam ends as the happiest of the Fellowship, having seen the Elves, served as Frodo's companion on the quest, and back in the Shire that he loves, marries Rosie and is blessed with many children.

The Jungian analyst Pia Skogemann views Sam as standing for one of the four cognitive functions, namely feeling, with the other three assigned to the other hobbits in the Fellowship: Frodo stands for thinking, Pippin for intuition, and Merry for sensation.

=== Relationship with Frodo ===
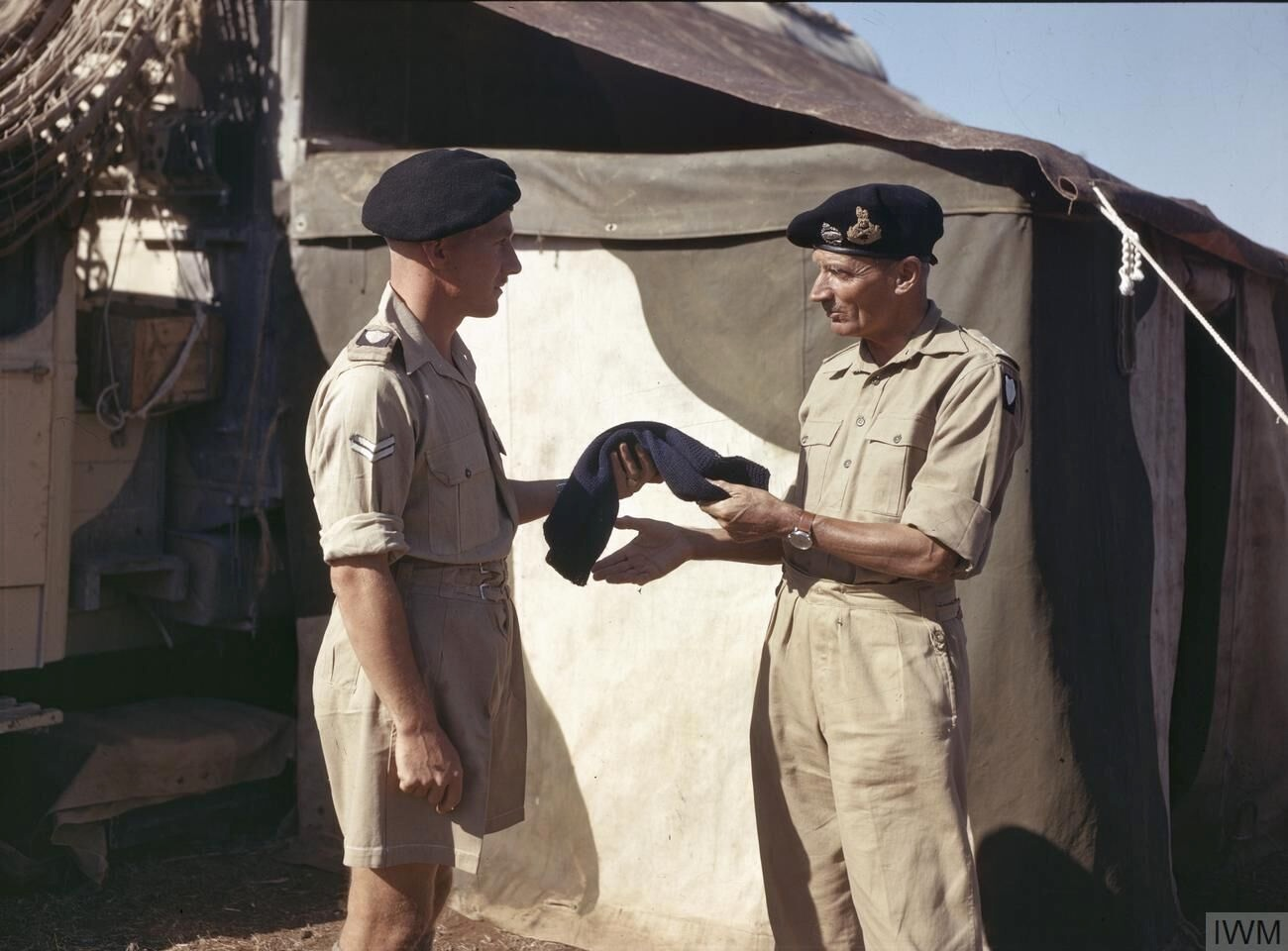
Tolkien stated that the relationship of Frodo and Sam reflected that of a British officer and his batman during the First World War.

During the journey to destroy the Ring, Sam's relationship with Frodo exemplifies that of a military servant or batman to his assigned officer in the British Army, in particular in the First World War in which Tolkien had served as an officer, with different batmen at different times. His biographer John Garth stated:

The relationship between Frodo and Sam closely reflects the hierarchy of an officer and his servant [in the First World War]. Officers had a university education and a middle-class background. Working-class men stayed at the rank of private or at best sergeant. A social gulf divides the literate, leisured Frodo from his former gardener, now responsible for wake-up calls, cooking and packing... Tolkien maps the gradual breakdown of restraint [through prolonged peril] until Sam can take Frodo in his arms and call him "Mr Frodo, my dear."

Tolkien wrote in a private letter: "My Sam Gamgee is indeed a reflexion of the English soldier, of the privates and batmen I knew in the 1914 war, and recognised as so far superior to myself." and elsewhere: "Sam was cocksure, and deep down a little conceited; but his conceit had been transformed by his devotion to Frodo. He did not think of himself as heroic or even brave, or in any way admirable – except in his service and loyalty to his master." (Note: Carpenter 2023, letter 246 to Eileen Elgar, September 1963)

Although Tolkien does not explicitly say so, Sam is in effect Frodo's self-appointed manservant, carrying out more mundane chores thus relieving his "master" of the necessity to do so, the term being used in (for example) Ishay Landa's essay "Slaves of the Ring: Tolkien's Political Unconscious". Tolkien himself gets closest to this terminology, possibly inadvertently, when in the account "Of The Rings of Power" in The Simarillion he writes: "For Frodo the Halfling, it is said, at the bidding of Mithrandir took on himself the burden [of destroying the One Ring], and alone with his servant he passed through peril and darkness and came at last in Sauron's despite even to Mount Doom; and there into the Fire where it was wrought he cast the Great Ring of Power, and so at last it was unmade and its evil consumed." (Note: Tolkien 1977, p. 365 (paperback edition, 1999))

=== Name ===
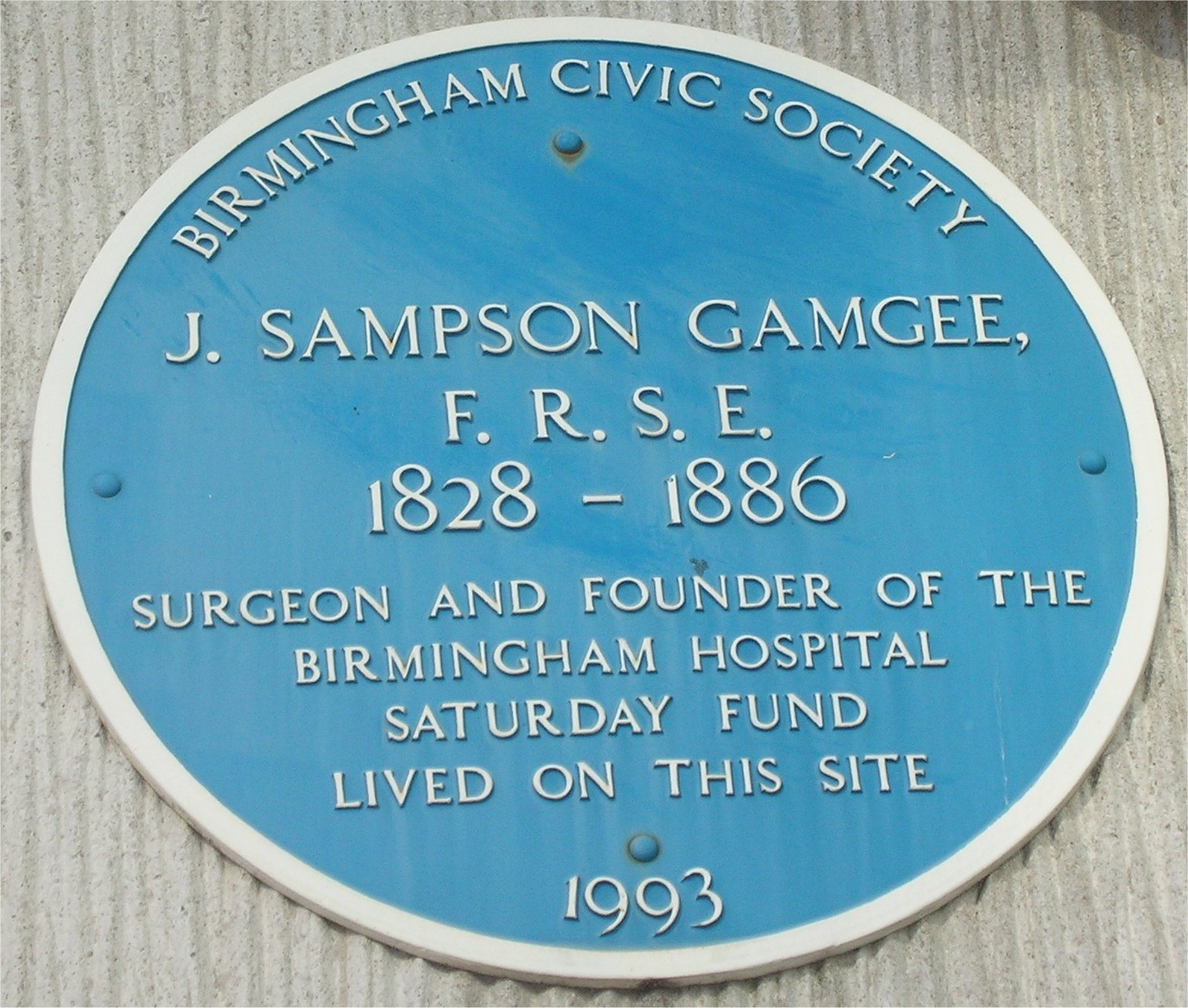
Sam's surname is from Sampson Gamgee, a Birmingham doctor who invented a surgical dressing; as a child, Tolkien knew the word "gamgee" as a name for cotton wool. (Note: Carpenter 2023, letter 257 to Christopher Bretherton, 16 July 1964)

Tolkien states in his "Guide to the Names in The Lord of the Rings" for translators of the book that he took the name "Gamgee" from a colloquial word in Birmingham for cotton wool. This came from Gamgee Tissue, a surgical dressing invented by the 19th-century Birmingham surgeon Sampson Gamgee. He claimed to have been genuinely surprised when, in March 1956, he received a letter from one Sam Gamgee, who had heard that his name was in The Lord of the Rings but had not read the book. Tolkien replied politely (Note: Carpenter 2023, letter 184 to Sam Gamgee, 18 March 1956) and sent Gamgee a signed copy of all three volumes of the book. He recorded in his journal "For some time I lived in fear of receiving a letter signed 'S. Gollum'. That would have been more difficult to deal with." (Note: Carpenter 1977, pp. 224–225) (Note: Tolkien later traced the origin of the English surname Gamgee to the Norman French surname "de Gamaches". (Note: Carpenter 2023, letter 324 to Graham Tayar, 4–5 June 1971))

In the fiction, Tolkien pretends that Sam's name is translated from the Westron Banazîr Galbasi. The forename comes from elements meaning "halfwise" or "simple", exactly matching the Old English Samwís. Galbasi comes from the name of the village Galabas. This uses the elements galab-, meaning "game", and bas-, roughly matching the English placename endings "-wich" or "-wick" (meaning in Old English a dwelling or specialised farm). In his frame story role as "translator" of the Red Book of Westmarch, Tolkien devised a strict English translation, Samwís Gamwich, which develops into Samwise Gammidgy and eventually comes to Samwise Gamgee in modern English. (Note: Tolkien 1955, Appendix F, II "On Translation")

Tolkien states in a letter that "Since Sam was close friends of the family of Cotton (another village-name), I was led astray into the Hobbit-like joke of spelling Gamwichy [as] Gamgee, though I do not think that in actual Hobbit-dialect the joke really arose", i.e. he was punning on the connected meanings in English of the Gamgee and Cotton family names, "cotton wool" and "cotton [fabric]". (Note: Carpenter 2023, letter 144 to Naomi Mitchison, 25 April 1954)

== Adaptations ==
Sam in Ralph Bakshi's animated version of The Lord of the Rings

In the 1971 Mind's Eye radio adaptation, Sam was voiced by Lou Bliss. In Ralph Bakshi's 1978 animated version of The Lord of the Rings, Sam was voiced by Michael Scholes. In the 1980 animated version of The Return of the King, made for television, the character was voiced by Roddy McDowall. In the 1981 BBC radio adaptation of The Lord of the Rings, Sam was played by Bill Nighy. In the 1993 Finnish television miniseries Hobitit, Sam is portrayed by Pertti Sveholm.

Sean Astin as Sam in Peter Jackson's The Lord of the Rings: The Two Towers

In the Peter Jackson movies The Lord of the Rings: The Fellowship of the Ring (2001), The Lord of the Rings: The Two Towers (2002) and The Lord of the Rings: The Return of the King (2003), Sam was played by Sean Astin. The batman relationship and class differences between Sam and Frodo are somewhat subdued, though Sam still refers to Frodo as "Mr." (but not "Master"). Entertainment Weekly called Sam Gamgee one of the "greatest sidekicks." UGO Networks named Sam as one of their top heroes in entertainment.

On stage, Sam was portrayed by Peter Howe in the Toronto stage production of The Lord of the Rings, which opened in 2006. In the United States, Sam was portrayed by Blake Bowden in the Cincinnati productions of The Fellowship of the Ring (2001), The Two Towers (2002), and The Return of the King (2003) for Clear Stage Cincinnati.
