= The Mind's Eye (publisher) =

American publisher

- Status: Defunct
- Founded: 1972; 54 years ago
- Founder: Bob Lewis
- Successor: Soundelux
- Country of origin: United States
- Publication types: Audiobooks

The Mind's Eye was a publisher which produced dramatized adaptations of various written works. They were one of America's biggest audio drama producers during the 1980s. They had mainstream distribution through chains like Waldenbooks and catalogs like Wireless, and they published an expansive catalog of adaptations of classic stories. They are most notable for the 1979 National Public Radio radio drama version of J.R.R. Tolkien's The Lord of the Rings and The Hobbit.

Prominent contributors included Bernard Mayes, Erik Bauersfeld, John Vickery, Lou Bliss, Gail Chugg, Tom Luce, Ray Reinhardt, James Arrington, Pat Franklyn, Wanda McCaddon, Rick Cimino, Joe Gostanian, John Joss, Karen Hurley, Kevin Gardiner, Darryl Ferreira, and Carl Hague. The company was acquired by Soundelux in 1992.

== List of Mind's Eye productions ==
Many of the productions were adapted and directed by Bob Lewis, and include:

1. Alice in Wonderland by Lewis Carroll (1972)
2. Alice Through the Looking Glass by Lewis Carroll (1972)
3. Beauty and the Beast by Mme. De Villeneuve (1975)
4. The Bride Comes to Yellow Sky by Stephen Crane (1972)
5. The Cask of Amontillado by Edgar Allan Poe
6. The Celebrated Jumping Frog by Mark Twain (1972)
7. A Christmas Carol by Charles Dickens (1972)
8. Dr. Heidegger's Experiment by Nathaniel Hawthorne
9. Dr. Jekyll & Mr. Hyde by Robert Louis Stevenson (1973)
10. The Fall of the House of Usher by Edgar Allan Poe
11. The Gold Bug by Edgar Allan Poe
12. Great Expectations by Charles Dickens
13. The Hobbit by J.R.R. Tolkien (1979) – Featuring Erik Bauersfeld as Smaug and Bard; Gail Chugg as the Narrator, Gollum, and Balin; Pat Franklyn as Roac, The Elven King, and Bombur; Carl Hague as Elrond; Joe Hughes as Great Goblin and Beorn; Tom Luce as Thorin; Bernard Mayes as Gandalf; and Ray Reinhardt as Bilbo Baggins
14. The Hound of the Baskervilles by Sir Arthur Conan Doyle (1975)
15. Huckleberry Finn by Mark Twain (1974)
16. The Invisible Man by H.G. Wells (1983)
17. The Legend of Sleepy Hollow by Washington Irving (1972)
18. The Light Princess by George MacDonald (1979)
19. Lord of the Rings by J.R.R. Tolkien (1979) – Adapted by Bernard Mayes
20. The Merry Adventures of Robin Hood by Howard Pyle (1974)
21. Metamorphosis by Franz Kafka (1982) – Adapted by Erik Bauersfeld
22. Mr. Higginbotham's Catastrophe by Nathaniel Hawthorne
23. My Kinsman, Major Molineux by Nathaniel Hawthorne
24. Pinocchio by Carlo Collodi
25. The Time Machine by H.G. Wells (1973)
26. Treasure Island by Robert Louis Stevenson (1972)
27. The Wind in the Willows by Kenneth Grahame (1979)
28. The Wizard of Oz by L. Frank Baum
29. Young Goodman Brown by Nathaniel Hawthorne
30. Aladdin by Antoine Galland (1974) – with James Arrington as Aladdin, Beverlee Cochrane as Scheherezade, Lynn Preisler as the Mother, Joe Hughes as the Sultan, and Joe Gostanian as the Vizier
31. A Connecticut Yankee in King Arthur's Court by Mark Twain
32. The Odyssey by Homer (1977)
33. Oedipus The King by Sophocles (1977)
34. Dracula by Bram Stoker (1983)
