= Library of American Broadcasting =

Library and collection at the Broadcasting Archives of the University of Maryland

Coordinates: 38°59′18″N 76°56′29″W

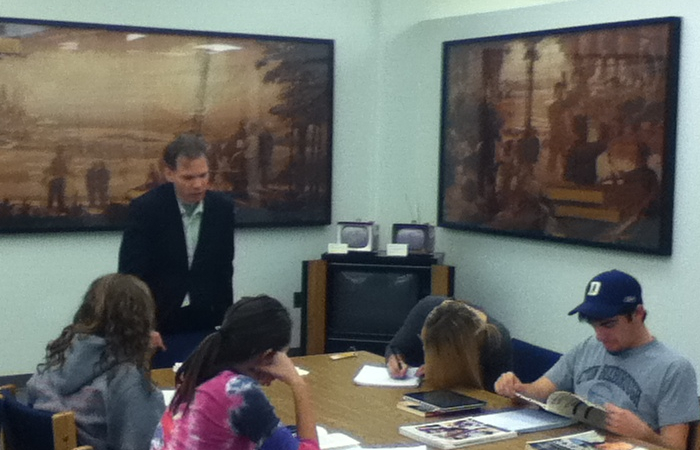
Murals commissioned by Broadcasting magazine in 1945 are part of the Library of American Broadcasting collection. The artist is W.B. McGill.

The Library of American Broadcasting – a Washington, D.C. institution since 1972 – was founded as the Broadcast Pioneers Library in space donated by the National Association of Broadcasters in their headquarters. The collection was thought up by William S. Hedges, a retired NBC executive, who created the Broadcasting Pioneers History Project in 1964 and began collecting historical materials.

The Library expanded rapidly for twenty years; but as space and funding became increasingly scarce, its governing board decided to seek another setting for the collection. They chose the University of Maryland, and in October 1994, the Library moved to its new location.

Now housed in the Broadcasting Archives at the University of Maryland, the Library of American Broadcasting is a wide-ranging collection of audio/video recordings, books, pamphlets, periodicals, personal collections, photographs, scripts, and vertical files devoted exclusively to the history of broadcasting. the Library holds many collections of note, including the papers of Sol Taishoff, founder of the influential industry publication Broadcasting; the papers of Helen J. Sioussat, director of the Talks Department at CBS (1937–58); scrapbooks, discs, photographs, speeches, scripts, awards, magazine and newspaper articles, and correspondence of Edward M. Kirby, Chief of the Radio Branch of the War Department in World War II, later also Chief of the Army's Radio-TV Branch in the Korean Conflict; and the papers of Edythe Meserand, radio executive and first President of American Women in Radio and Television, among others.

The Library of American Broadcasting received on-screen credit for research materials provided to the producers of the film Good Night and Good Luck (2005). The holdings of the Library yielded photographs of Murrow, as well as a number of shots of the CBS studios and offices of that era. These were instrumental in creating the period detail of the film, which received a total of six Academy Award nominations, one for Art Direction.
