= Tom Bombadil =

Middle-earth character

- Middle-earth character
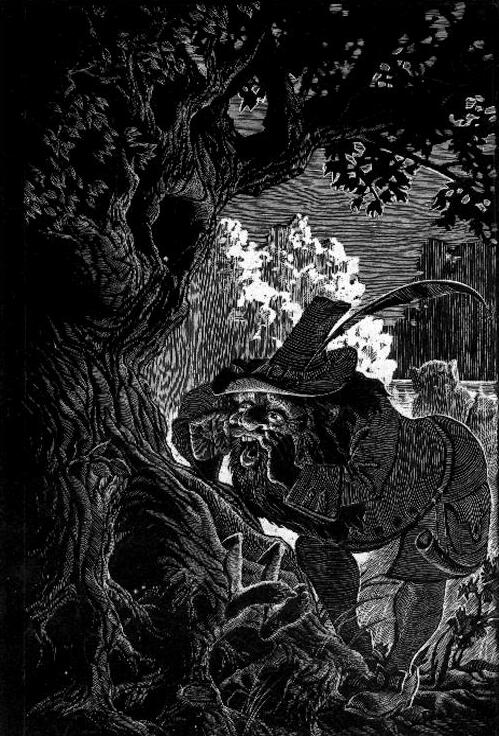
- Tom Bombadil frees the Hobbits from Old Man Willow. Scraperboard illustration by Alexander Korotich, 1981
- First appearance: The Oxford Magazine; 1934

In-universe information
- Aliases: Iarwain Ben-adar, Forn, Orald
- Species: Undefined
- Spouse: Goldberry
- Book(s): The Fellowship of the Ring (1954); The Adventures of Tom Bombadil (1962); Tales from the Perilous Realm (1997)

Tom Bombadil is a character in J. R. R. Tolkien's legendarium. He first appeared in print in a 1934 poem called "The Adventures of Tom Bombadil", which included The Lord of the Rings characters Goldberry (his wife), Old Man Willow (an evil tree in his forest) and the barrow-wight, from whom he rescues the hobbits. They were not then explicitly part of the older legends that became The Silmarillion, and are not mentioned in The Hobbit.

Bombadil is best known from his appearance as a supporting character in Tolkien's novel The Lord of the Rings, published in 1954 and 1955. In the first volume, The Fellowship of the Ring, Frodo Baggins and company meet Bombadil in the Old Forest. The idea for this meeting and the appearances of Old Man Willow and the barrow-wight appears in some of Tolkien's earliest notes for a sequel to The Hobbit. Bombadil is mentioned, but not seen, near the end of The Return of the King, where Gandalf plans to pay him a long visit.

Tom Bombadil has been omitted in radio adaptations of The Lord of the Rings, the 1978 animated film, and Peter Jackson's film trilogy, as nonessential to the story.

Commentators have debated Bombadil's role and origins. A likely source is the demigod Väinämöinen in the Finnish epic poem Kalevala, with many points of resemblance. Scholars have stated that he is the spirit of a place, a genius loci.

== Appearances ==
=== "The Adventures of Tom Bombadil" ===
Old Tom Bombadil was a merry fellow;
bright blue his jacket was and his boots were yellow,
green were his girdle and his breeches all of leather;
he wore in his tall hat a swan-wing feather.
He lived up under Hill, where the Withywindle
ran from a grassy well down into the dingle.

— "The Adventures of Tom Bombadil"

The original version of Tolkien's poem "The Adventures of Tom Bombadil" was published in 1934 in The Oxford Magazine. The poem depicts Bombadil as a "merry fellow" living in a small valley close to the Withywindle river, where he wanders and explores nature at his leisure. Several of the valley's mysterious residents, including the "River-woman's daughter" Goldberry, the malevolent tree-spirit Old Man Willow, the Badger-folk and a barrow-wight, attempt to capture Bombadil for their own ends. However, they quail at the power of his voice, which defeats their enchantments and commands them to return to their natural existence. At the end of the poem, Bombadil captures and marries Goldberry. Throughout the poem, he is unconcerned by the attempts to capture him and brushes them off with the power in his words.

Bombadil makes it clear that he found Goldberry in the Withywindle river, calling her "River-woman's daughter". The Tolkien scholar John D. Rateliff suggests that, at least in terms of Tolkien's early mythology, she should be seen as one of the fays, spirits, and elementals (including the Maia): "Thus Melian is a 'fay', (as, in all probability, are Goldberry and Bombadil; the one a nymph, the other a genius loci)".

The later poem "Bombadil Goes Boating" anchors Bombadil in Middle-earth, featuring a journey down the Withywindle to the Brandywine river, where Hobbits ("Little Folk I know there") live at Hays-end. Bombadil is challenged by various river residents on his journey, including birds, otters, and Hobbits, but charms them all with his voice, ending his journey at the farm of Farmer Maggot, where he drinks ale and dances with the family. At the end of the poem, the charmed birds and otters work together to bring Bombadil's boat home. The poem includes a reference to the Norse lay of Ótr, when Bombadil threatens to give the hide of a disrespectful otter to the barrow-wights, who he says will cover it with gold apart from a single whisker. The poem mentions Middle-earth locations including Hays-end, Bree, and the Tower Hills and speaks of "Tall Watchers by the Ford, Shadows on the Marches". (Note: Tolkien 2014, 1. "The Adventures of Tom Bombadil")

=== The Lord of the Rings ===
There was another burst of song, and then suddenly, hopping and dancing along the path, there appeared above the reeds an old battered hat with a tall crown and a long blue feather stuck in the band. With another hop and a bound there came into view a man, or so it seemed. At any rate he was too large and heavy for a hobbit, if not quite tall enough for one of the Big People, though he made noise enough for one, stumping along with great yellow boots on his thick legs, and charging through grass and rushes like a cow going down to drink. He had a blue coat and a long brown beard; his eyes were blue and bright, and his face was red as a ripe apple, but creased into a hundred wrinkles of laughter. In his hand he carried on a large leaf as on a tray a small pile of white water-lilies.

— The Fellowship of the Ring, book 1, ch. 6, "The Old Forest"

In The Fellowship of the Ring, Tom Bombadil helps Frodo Baggins and his Hobbit companions on their journey to destroy the Ring. (Note: Tolkien 1954a, book 1, ch. 6, "The Old Forest") (Note: Tolkien 1954a, book 1, ch. 7, "In the House of Tom Bombadil") (Note: Tolkien 1954a, book 1, ch. 8, "Fog on the Barrow-Downs") Tom and his wife, Goldberry, the "Daughter of the River", still live in their house by the source of the Withywindle, and some of the characters and situations from the original poem reappear.

Tom first appears when Merry and Pippin are trapped in the Old Forest by Old Man Willow, and Frodo and Sam cry for help. Tom commands Old Man Willow to release them, singing him to sleep.

The Hobbits spend two nights in Tom Bombadil's house, which serves as one of Frodo's five Homely Houses. Here it is seen that the One Ring has no power over Bombadil; he can see Frodo when the Ring makes him invisible to others and can wear it himself with no effect. He even tosses the Ring in the air and makes it disappear but then produces it from his other hand and returns it to Frodo. The idea of giving him the Ring for safekeeping is rejected in Book Two's second chapter, "The Council of Elrond". Gandalf says that it is unwise to consider Tom as having power over the Ring and that rather, "the Ring has no power over him...". He suggests that Tom would not find the Ring to be very important and so might simply misplace it.

Before sending the Hobbits on their way, Tom teaches them a rhyme to summon him if they fall into danger again within his borders. This proves fortunate, as the four are trapped by a barrow-wight. After rescuing them, Tom gives each Hobbit a long dagger taken from the treasure in the barrow. He refuses to pass the borders of his own land, but he directs them to the Prancing Pony Inn at Bree.

Towards the end of The Return of the King, when Gandalf leaves the Hobbits, he mentions that he wants to have a long talk with Bombadil, calling him a "moss-gatherer". Gandalf says, in response to Frodo's query of how well Bombadil is getting along, that Bombadil is "as well as ever", "quite untroubled" and "not much interested in anything that we have done and seen", save their visits to the Ents. At the very end of The Lord of the Rings, as Frodo sails into the West and leaves Middle-earth forever, he has what seems to him the very experience that appeared to him in the house of Bombadil in his dream of the second night. (Note: Tolkien 1955, book 6, ch. 7 "Homeward Bound" and ch. 9 "The Grey Havens")

== Concept and creation ==
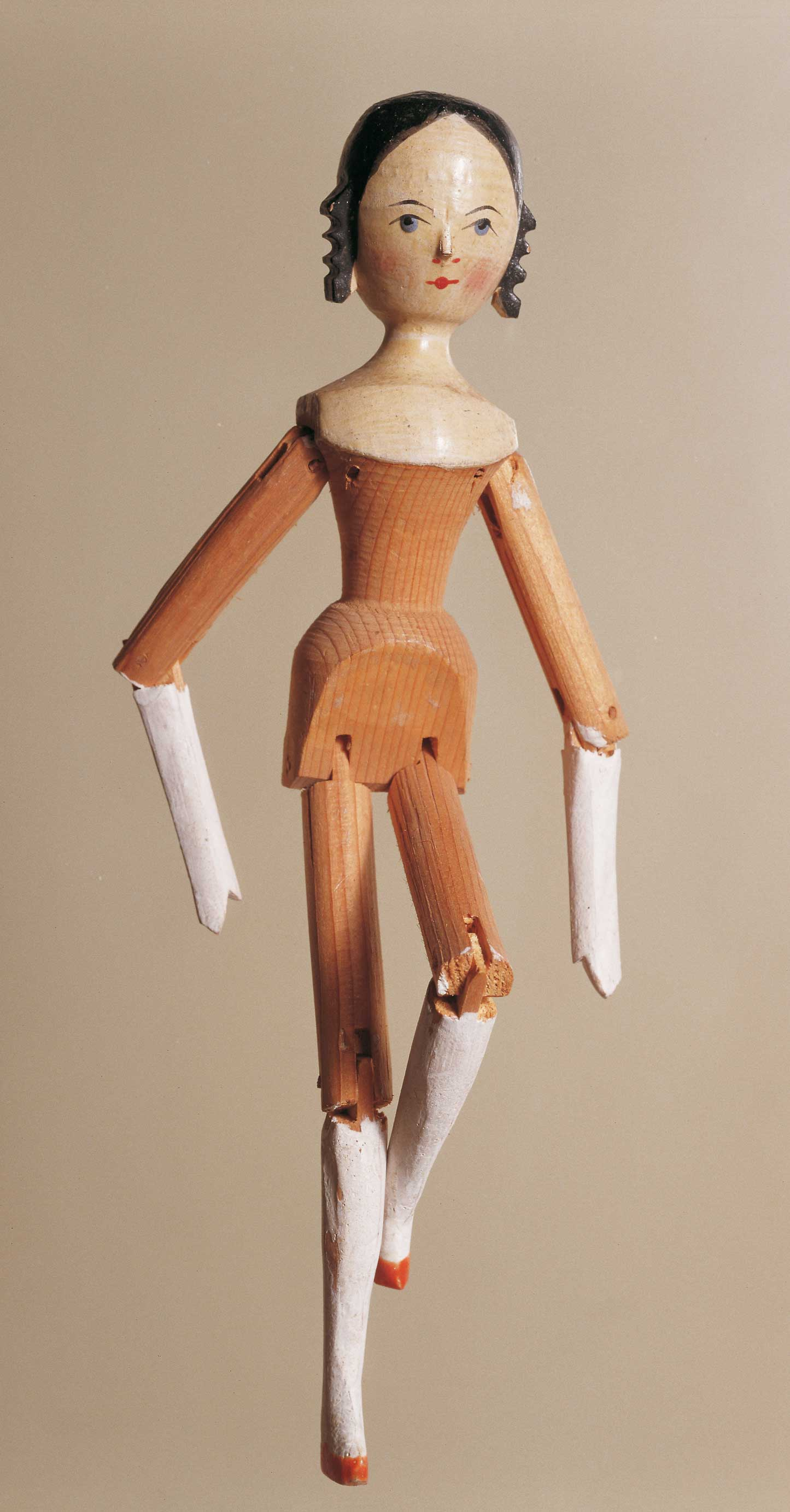
A Dutch doll, a wooden peg construction giving a stiff doll with hinged joints, illustrates the type of toy that inspired the name Tom Bombadil. The one owned by the Tolkien family had a hat with a feather.

Tolkien stated that he invented Tom Bombadil in memory of his children's Dutch doll. (Note: Tolkien wrote: "The doll looked very splendid with the feather in its hat, but John did not like it and one day stuffed it down the lavatory. Tom was rescued, and survived to become the hero of a poem...") His Bombadil poems far pre-date the writing of The Lord of the Rings, into which Tolkien introduced Tom Bombadil from the earliest drafts. (Note: Tolkien 1988, pp. 42, 115 ff.) In response to a letter, Tolkien described Tom in The Lord of the Rings as "just an invention" and "not an important person – to the narrative", even if "he represents something that I feel important, though I would not be prepared to analyse the feeling precisely. I would not, however, have left him in, if he did not have some kind of function." Specifically, Tolkien connected Tom in the letter to a renunciation of control, "a delight in things for themselves without reference to yourself," "Botany and Zoology (as sciences) and Poetry". (Note: Carpenter 2023, #144, letter to Naomi Mitchison, 25 April 1954) In another letter, Tolkien writes that he does not think Tom is improved by philosophizing; he included the character "because I had already 'invented' him independently" (in The Oxford Magazine) "and wanted an 'adventure' on the way". (Note: Carpenter 2023, #153, draft of letter to Peter Hastings, September 1954)

Tolkien commented further that "even in a mythical Age there must be some enigmas, as there always are. Tom Bombadil is one (intentionally)". In a letter to Stanley Unwin, Tolkien called Tom Bombadil the spirit of the vanishing landscapes of Oxfordshire and Berkshire. However, this 1937 letter was in reference to works which pre-dated the writing of The Lord of the Rings. (Note: Carpenter 2023, #19, letter to Stanley Unwin, 16 December 1937)

Tolkien said little of Tom Bombadil's origins, and the character does not fit neatly into the categories of beings Tolkien created. Bombadil calls himself the "Eldest" and the "Master". He claims to remember "the first raindrop and the first acorn", and that he "knew the dark under the stars when it was fearless—before the Dark Lord came from Outside". When Frodo asks Goldberry just who Tom Bombadil is, she responds simply by saying "He is". Some critics have taken this dialogue as a reference to God's statement "I Am that I Am" in the Book of Exodus, an idea which Tolkien denied as an influence.

== Analysis ==
=== Väinämöinen ===
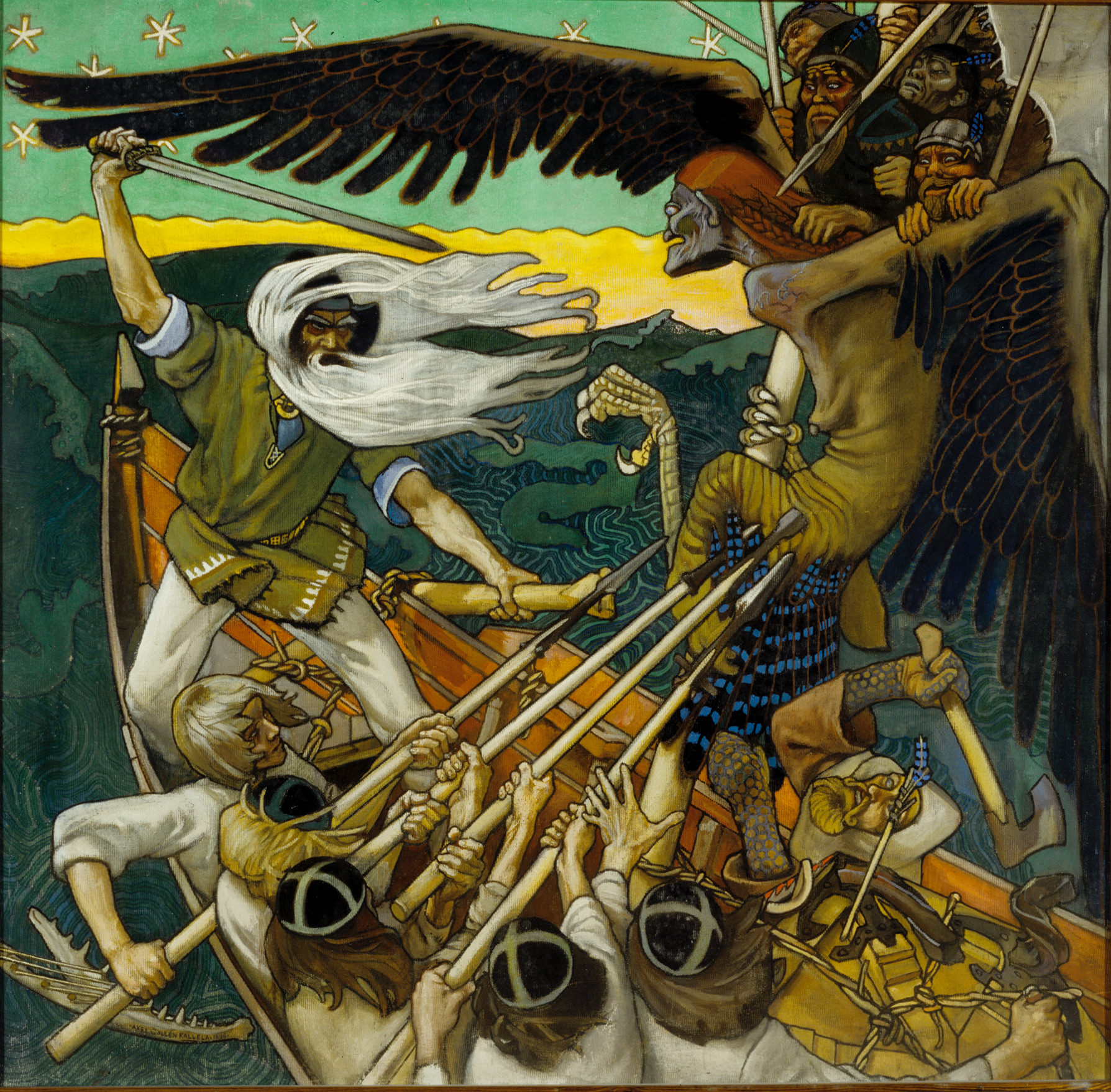
Tom Bombadil's antecedents may include the demigod Väinämöinen from the Finnish epic poem Kalevala. Painting The Defense of the Sampo by Akseli Gallen-Kallela, 1896

The scholar of folklore David Elton Gay writes that Tolkien was inspired by the poetry of the Kalevala, Elias Lönnrot's 1849 collection of Finland's oral tradition. Gay suggests with a detailed comparison that Tom Bombadil was directly modelled on the Kalevala's central character, the demigod Väinämöinen.

David Elton Gay's comparison of Tom Bombadil with the demigod Väinämöinen in the 1849 Kalevala
Väinämöinen	Tom Bombadil
Oldest, immortal
Lives in a small forested country that he controls but does not own
Extremely close to his world, exemplifying "naturalness"
Fearless, because powerful
Power through song and knowledge
Sings for the pleasure of singing
"Day by day he sang unwearied"	Mostly speaks through song
As oldest living being, he saw creation, heard names of all beings, knows songs of their origins, helped shape the land	"I am old, Eldest, that's what I am ... Tom was here before the river and the trees" "Tom remembers the first raindrop and the first acorn"

=== Sauron's opposite ===
The Tolkien scholar Verlyn Flieger writes that if there was an opposite to Sauron in The Lord of the Rings, it would not be Aragorn, his battlefield opponent, nor Gandalf, his spiritual enemy, but Tom Bombadil, the earthly Master who is entirely free of the desire to dominate, and hence cannot be dominated. The Christian scholar W. Christopher Stewart sees Bombadil as embodying the pursuit of knowledge purely for its own sake, driven only by his sense of wonder. In his view, this goes some way to explaining Bombadil's indifference to the One Ring, whose only purpose is power and domination.

Sauron's opposite, as analysed by Verlyn Flieger
	Sauron	Tom Bombadil
Role	Antagonist	Earthly counterpart
Title	Dark Lord	"Master"
Purpose	Domination of whole of Middle-earth	Care for The Old Forest "No hidden agenda, no covert desire or plan of operation"
Effect of the One Ring	"Power over other wills"	No effect on him "as he is not human", nor does it prevent him seeing someone who is wearing the Ring
How he sees the Ring	The Eye of Sauron desires to dominate through the Ring	Looks right through it, his "blue eye peering through the circle of the Ring"

=== Multiple levels of meaning ===
Jane Beal, in the Journal of Tolkien Research, writes that Bombadil can be considered using "the four levels of meaning found in medieval scriptural exegesis and literary interpretation". These are different ways of understanding a text, rather than necessarily contradicting each other.

Jane Beal's analysis of Bombadil's multiple levels of meaning
Level	Meaning
Literal	Real world: a wooden doll that belonged to Michael Tolkien. Sub-created world: "Eldest".
Allegorical	Real world: the spirit of the vanishing English countryside. Sub-created world: a figure of the study of Zoology, Botany, and Poetry, parallel to the first, prelapsarian Adam. (Note: The Tolkien scholar Brian Rosebury writes that Bombadil's relation to the land of which he is the Master is "like that of an unfallen Adam to the Garden of Eden".)
Moral	A storyteller, representative of Tolkien himself.
Anagogical	A figure of the second Adam, Jesus.

=== Jungian interpretation ===
The psychologist Timothy R. O'Neill interpreted Bombadil from a Jungian perspective in The Individuated Hobbit: Jung, Tolkien, and the Archetypes of Middle-Earth (1979). O'Neill finds Bombadil to be the manifestation of the Self archetype and a vision of man's beginning and destiny:

A common and potent archetype is Original Man, which Jung often calls Anthropos, emerging as a conscious representative of the Self. Bombadil, despite his apparently humble digs in the Old Forest, is the prototype of the Children of God, that Original Man and the template which will influence the final form of Man... he is the cosmic seed from which Man develops."

The Tolkien scholar Patrick Grant notes that "Jung also talks of a common figure, the 'vegetation numen,' king of the forest, who is associated with wood and water in a manner that recalls Tom Bombadil."

=== Early interpretations ===
Robert Foster, author of an early guide to Middle-earth, suggested in 1978 that Bombadil is one of the Maiar, angelic beings sent from Valinor. The Tolkien scholar and philosopher Gene Hargrove argued in Mythlore in 1986 that Tolkien understood who Bombadil is, but purposefully made him enigmatic. Hargrove suggested that Tolkien left clues that Bombadil is one of the Valar, a god of Middle-earth, specifically Aulë, the archangelic demigod who created the dwarves.

== Adaptations ==
Bombadil and Goldberry with the four hobbits made to look much smaller using a green-screen technique in the 1991 Russian television play Khraniteli

Along with the adventures in Crickhollow, the Old Forest, and the Barrow-downs, Bombadil is omitted from Peter Jackson's interpretation of The Lord of the Rings. Jackson explained that this was because he and his co-writers felt that the character does little to advance the story, and including him would make the film unnecessarily long. Christopher Lee concurred, stating the scenes were left out to make time for showing Saruman's capture of Gandalf. (Note: Some of Bombadil's dialogue, as well as the scene in which the hobbits meet Old Man Willow, are transferred into scenes which Merry and Pippin share with Treebeard in Jackson's adaptation, included in the extended edition DVD.) Bombadil has appeared in other radio and film adaptations. He was played by Norman Shelley in the 1955–1956 BBC radio adaptation of The Lord of the Rings, a performance that Tolkien thought "dreadful"; in his view even worse was that Goldberry was announced as his daughter and Willowman "an ally of Mordor (!!)" (his emphasis). (Note: Carpenter 2023, #175 to Mrs Molly Waldron, 30 November 1955) He was portrayed by Esko Hukkanen in the 1993 Finnish miniseries Hobitit. He appeared, too, in the 1979 Mind's Eye recordings, where he was played by Bernard Mayes, who also voiced Gandalf.

He was included, along with Goldberry and the Barrow-wight, in the 1991 Russian adaptation of The Fellowship of the Ring, Khraniteli.

Tom Bombadil is portrayed by Rory Kinnear, and acts as a guide to Gandalf in the second season of The Lord of the Rings: The Rings of Power.

Bombadil as depicted in The Lord of the Rings Trading Card Game

Although Bombadil was not portrayed in Ralph Bakshi's or Jackson's films, a Tom Bombadil card exists in The Lord of the Rings Trading Card Game by Decipher, Inc. (part of the trilogy's merchandise). The model portraying Bombadil on this card is Harry Wellerchew. Bombadil is a non-player character in the MMORPG game The Lord of the Rings Online, serving as a main character in Book 1 of the epic quests.

Bombadil appears as a playable character in the LEGO The Lord of the Rings and The Hobbit video games. He has no impact in the main story for either game, as the games are direct adaptations of the Peter Jackson films rather than the original novels, but he later appears as an unlockable character in the Middle Earth hub world and can be used in free-play mode. He appears, too, on a "God" type card in the Magic: The Gathering expansion The Lord of the Rings: Tales of Middle-earth.

The 1969 Harvard Lampoon novel Bored of the Rings parodies Tom Bombadil as "Tim Benzedrine", a stereotypical hippie married to "Hash-berry". One of his songs is rewritten as:

Toke-a-lid! Smoke-a-lid! Pop the mescalino!
Stash the hash! Gonna crash! Make mine methedrino!
Hop a hill! Pop a pill! For Old Tim Benzedrino!
