= Robin de la Condamine =

English actor (1877–1966)

Robin de la Condamine starring in Captivation, 1931

Robin de la Condamine (6 November 1877 – 11 January 1966) was an English actor who used the stage name Robert Farquharson. Harold Acton wrote that he was "our last great actor" in the tradition of Henry Irving and that he was known for his "emphatic stammer" and his dandyish ways.

Of Spanish descent, Condamine was born in London and attended Rugby School. He studied under actor F.H. Macklin and made his stage debut in two plays by Henrik Ibsen at the age of 21.

In 1905, he played Herod in the English premiere of Oscar Wilde's Salomé, directed by Florence Farr, impressing critics Max Beerbohm and Robbie Ross. On the basis of this success, he was cast by Farr as Foragel in William Butler Yeats' The Shadowy Waters. Yeats disliked his performance, complaining that Condamine was "over-emphatic and shoots his voice up and down the scale in a perfectly accidental way" and that "You cannot play Foragel without nobility or any of my verse without pride & he has neither." Yeats wrote "I long to get him by myself and make him speak on a note day after day till he had got rid of accidental variety" but since Condamine and the other actors were performing without pay as a favor to Farr, Yeats could not have him removed from the play.

Under the direction of Theodore Komisarjevsky, Condamine played the title characters in Anton Chekhov's Uncle Vanya and Ivanov and played Vladimir Lenin alongside John Gielgud's Leon Trotsky in Hubert Griffith's Red Sunday. Other roles include Duke Ferdinand in John Webster's The Duchess of Malfi (1919), Iachimo in Shakespeare's Cymbeline (1923) and Czar Paul I of Russia in Such Men Are Dangerous (1929) by Ashley Dukes. His best known role was in 1922 as the Count alongside Sybil Thorndike as the Count's daughter Beatrice in the first public performance of Percy Bysshe Shelley's controversial verse drama The Cenci, directed by Lewis Casson

Later in life he performed in radio dramas, including the 1955-6 radio adaptation of J. R. R. Tolkien's The Lord of the Rings, in which he played Saruman and Denethor. He quipped to Donald Wolfit "I have been doing a recording for the Third programme but it has all come to an end now. The man who used to listen has bought a television set."

== The Author ==
Harold Acton, in his More Memoirs of an Aesthete, says: "He had published a single book, The Upper Garden. It begins: 'In those days which are consecutive, so as to give life or memory to each other, and to which men give one name of Life or another name of Death, beyond the garden bright with tulip-cups or poised with the gloom of rose-bowers, there is, in some moods, a new delight of dark trees and dark ponds, or tangled colours that were not set against each other in the war of the known gardens - a competition that often gives no greater suggestion to a garden than the war of life' and it rambles on in the same strain for 264 close-written pages."
