= Donald Wolfit =

English actor-manager (1902–1968)

Sir Donald Wolfit CBE
- Wolfit as Hamlet, 1936-37
- Born: Donald Woolfitt; 20 April 1902; New Balderton, Nottinghamshire, England
- Died: 17 February 1968 (aged 65); Hammersmith, London, England
- Occupation: Actor-manager
- Years active: 1924–1968
- Spouse(s): Chris Castor (1928–1934); Susan Katherine Anthony; Rosalind Iden (m.1948)

Sir Donald Wolfit (born Donald Woolfitt; 20 April 1902 – 17 February 1968) was an English actor-manager, known for his touring productions of Shakespeare. He was especially renowned for his portrayal of King Lear.

Born to a conventional middle-class family in Nottinghamshire, Wolfit was stage-struck from an early age. His debut was at the Robin Hood Opera House at Averham to which he cycled from school to join the theatre rep company. After a brief spell as a teacher he joined the touring company of the actor-manager Charles Doran and later that of Fred Terry. He made his London début in 1924 and simplified the spelling of his surname from Woolfitt to Wolfit.

In 1929 Wolfit joined Lilian Baylis's company at the Old Vic but developed a strong antipathy to the leading man, John Gielgud, and left the company after a season. He joined the Shakespeare Memorial Theatre companies for the festivals of 1936 and 1937, in thirteen major roles, winning excellent reviews for his performance as Hamlet. He then set up his own touring company, taking the plays of Shakespeare and others round Britain and from time to time overseas. He continued to appear in the West End and made several films but his main concern was for his touring company. Its standards were criticised but several members moved on to greater fame, including Harold Pinter and Brian Rix.

== Life and career ==
=== Early years ===
Wolfit was born at New Balderton, near Newark-on-Trent, Nottinghamshire, on 20 April 1902, the second son and fourth of five children of William Pearce Woolfitt and his wife Emma, née Tomlinson. It was a conventional household; Woolfitt senior was an Anglican churchgoer, a Conservative supporter and a Freemason. (Note: His son continued the attachment to Freemasonry, into which he was initiated by his father in 1937. He became Master of the Green Room Lodge and a Grand Officer.) From his early childhood Wolfit wanted to become an actor, despite his father's disapproval.

After education at Magnus Grammar School in Newark he was briefly a schoolmaster in Eastbourne before passing an audition for the actor-manager Charles Doran. Doran's touring company was a training ground for many British actors, including Ralph Richardson, Cecil Parker, Edith Sharpe, Norman Shelley, Abraham Sofaer and Francis L Sullivan. Wolfit's début role, at the Theatre Royal, York on 13 September 1920, was Biondello in Doran's production of The Taming of The Shrew. Between his engagement with Doran and his West End début in 1924 he toured with the companies of Alexander Marsh and later Fred Terry. For the rest of his life Wolfit acknowledged his debt to the latter for what he had learnt from him.

Wolfit made his London début on 26 November 1924 at the New Theatre, as Phirous in Matheson Lang's production of The Wandering Jew. At about this time he simplified the spelling of his surname from Woolfitt to Wolfit. He appeared in supporting roles in West End productions, and at St George's, Westminster, on 16 April 1928, he married an actress, Chris Frances Castor, with whom he had a daughter, Margaret Wolfit, who was also an actress. The marriage lasted until 1933, when the couple divorced.

In 1929 Wolfit joined Lilian Baylis's company at the Old Vic and played Tybalt in Romeo and Juliet, Cassius in Julius Caesar, Touchstone in As You Like It, Macduff in Macbeth and Claudius in Hamlet. The company's leading man was John Gielgud, to whom Wolfit took a strong and lasting dislike, envious of Gielgud's success and being what the biographer Sheridan Morley describes as "virulently anti-homosexual". (Note: According to Morley, Wolfit's homophobia was based not merely on prejudice but concern that the subtler style of acting by Gielgud and other gay actors would make his own "old-fashioned barnstorming virility" obsolete.) Wolfit made himself unpopular with his fellow actors and his contract was not renewed after the first year.

=== 1930s ===
After further West End appearances, Wolfit joined Sir Barry Jackson's company in 1931 for a six-month tour of Canada. He played Robert Browning in The Barretts of Wimpole Street, Young Marlowe in She Stoops to Conquer, Joe Varwell in Yellow Sands, Coade in Dear Brutus and Shakespeare in The Dark Lady of the Sonnets. He overcame his hatred of Gielgud enough to accept the role of Thomas Mowbray in Richard of Bordeaux (1932) with a cast headed by Gielgud and Gwen Ffrangcon-Davies; the piece ran for more than a year. Wolfit made a impression in 1933 in the title role of a one-night-only production of Hamlet at the Arts Theatre using the First Quarto text rather than the First Folio text usually given. The Daily Telegraph said,

Mr Donald Wolfit definitely wins his spurs with his performance of Hamlet. ... His one fault – a common one to young actors – was to raise the pitch too high before the closet scene, in which the note of hysteria was too dominant in consequence. But it was on the whole a very vivid piece of playing.

Encouraged by this success Wolfit determined to try his hand as an actor-manager. He secured financial backing and staged a week-long drama festival in his native Newark in 1934. He presented Arms and the Man, The Master Builder and Twelfth Night, playing Bluntschli, Solness and Malvolio. Among the actors he engaged were John Clements, Elspeth March, Margaret Rutherford and Margaret Webster. In the same year, on 15 September, he married Susan Katherine Anthony; they had a son and a daughter. He made his first film appearance in 1934, as St Francis of Assisi in a short film called Inasmuch. He appeared in other films in the 1930s, after which he did not work in films again until the 1950s.

Wolfit joined the Shakespeare Memorial Theatre companies for the festivals of 1936 and 1937, with eight major roles in the first, including Hamlet and five in the second. His Hamlet was favourably reviewed by the critics and, according to his biographer Ronald Harwood, "the performance of Hamlet elevated Wolfit to the ranks of leading players". The critic Audrey Williamson wrote that although Wolfit was never as physically suited as Gielgud to the role of Hamlet, in his Stratford performances he gave the character "an electric drive and force of suffering ... There was thought behind every gesture and line and again and again one was struck by the subtlety of detail". Another critic wrote, "Mr Wolfit has crowned his season's work with a distinguished performance not unworthy of comparison with the great Hamlets". The director at Stratford was Ben Iden Payne, whose daughter Rosalind Iden became Wolfit's leading lady. He fell in love with her, left his wife, and lived with Iden, eventually marrying her in 1948.

=== Second World War ===
At the outbreak of the Second World War, despite strong advice to the contrary, Wolfit refused to cancel his plans for an autumn tour. He told the press, "Here is my national effort at present. They don't want me in the Services yet, so I am endeavouring to carry on with my plans. All my company are waiting to serve when called on". The company played a season in 1940 at the Kingsway Theatre in London. Later that year Wolfit presented lunch-time Scenes from Shakespeare at the Strand Theatre during the Blitz. A German bomb destroyed his scenery and costume store but he continued to tour. In 1944 he visited Egypt for the Entertainments National Service Association, followed by seasons in Paris and Brussels.

=== Postwar ===
Wolfit toured more often than he played in London. Hermione Gingold adapted an old theatrical joke, saying that "Olivier is a tour-de-force, and Wolfit is forced to tour" but Wolfit preferred touring with his company and was often unhappy in West End productions, beholden to directors and acting alongside major actors to whom he was not clearly superior. (Note: This theatrical jibe goes back at least to the 19th century. It was said of Seymour Hicks that whereas David Garrick and Henry Irving had been tours de force, Hicks had been forced to tour. A later iteration concerned Lilian Braithwaite and Mrs Patrick Campbell in the 1930s, and the use of the phrase for Olivier and Wolfit was a recycling for a 1940s revue by Gingold's writers.) He firmly believed that Shakespeare should be taken to the people and used West End appearances and films to subsidise his touring company. After the war he continued his annual tours in Britain and in 1947 he presented two successful tours of Canada, a season in New York and a London season at the Savoy Theatre.

Hoping to present his company in another London season in 1949, Wolfit found that no West End theatre was available and instead he took an old music hall, The Bedford, in Camden Town, north London. He presented a sixteen-week season of "Shakespeare at popular prices", and played to packed houses. The Stage said of his performance in King Lear, "There is no acting in our theatre to-day as magnificent as that of Donald Wolfit when he plays Lear" but his productions had cheap costumes and scenery and his company was below his own standard of acting. Among the audience during this season was the young Bernard Levin, who later wrote that although "Wolfit and his dreadful company ... horribly travestied Shakespeare" they nevertheless enabled young people to come to know and love the plays and for this Levin held Wolfit's memory in high honour. Levin recalled Wolfit's customary curtain call, "with the old megalomanic, as he thanked the audience, indulging in the same exhausted clutch of the curtain", which Stephen Potter said he did whether he had been "laying himself out with Lear or trotting through twenty minutes of Touchstone".

In 1950 Wolfit was appointed CBE. In that year Tyrone Guthrie invited him to return to the Old Vic to play Lear, Timon of Athens, Lord Ogleby in The Clandestine Marriage and Christopher Marlowe's Tamburlaine the Great. He had great success in these roles but according to Harwood he "chafed at performing in a company other than his own and surrounded by excellent supporting actors". He quarrelled with Guthrie and left the company.

Wolfit returned to actor-management in 1953 with a season at the King's Theatre, Hammersmith, with a stronger company than usual. He opened to enthusiastic reviews and full houses for a double bill of Oedipus the King and Oedipus at Colonus but in Harwood's words, later in the season and for the last time, "he resorted to his tired Shakespearian productions, in which, however, he gave some magnificent performances". Although Wolfit's touring companies were frequently criticised, they nevertheless included, among many less familiar names, future stars such as Peter Jones, Harold Pinter, Eric Porter, Brian Rix, Frank Thornton and Richard Wattis.

In 1957 Wolfit announced his retirement as an actor-manager, but after his knighthood in that year he emerged from retirement and undertook one final tour under his own management. A major role of his later years was the title character of Henrik Ibsen's John Gabriel Borkman at the Duchess Theatre in 1963. One critic said that Wolfit's performance would have pleased Ibsen and deserved to be regarded as the definitive portrayal. Wolfit's last stage appearance was in the musical Robert and Elizabeth, as the tyrannical Mr Barrett in 1966–67. Wolfit died in the Royal Masonic Hospital, London, on 17 February 1968 and was buried in St Peter's Church, Hurstbourne Tarrant, Hampshire.

== Filmography ==
Film
Year	Title	Role	Notes
1931	Down River		
1934	Death at Broadcasting House	Sydney Parsons	
1935	Drake of England	Thomas Doughty	
1935	The Silent Passenger	Henry Camberley	
1935	Checkmate	Jack Barton	
1935	Late Extra	Inspector Greville	
1935	Hyde Park Corner	Howard	Uncredited
1935	Sexton Blake and the Bearded Doctor	Percy	
1936	Calling the Tune	Dick Finlay	
1938	The Claydon Treasure Mystery	Executive	Uncredited
1952	The Pickwick Papers	Sergeant Buzfuz	
1952	The Ringer	Dr. Lomond	
1953	Isn't Life Wonderful!	Uncle Willie	
1954	Svengali	Svengali	
1955	A Prize of Gold	Stratton	
1955	A Man on the Beach	Carter	short
1956	The Man in the Road	Professor Cattrell	
1956	Guilty?	Judge	
1956	Satellite in the Sky	Merrity	
1957	The Traitor	Colonel Price	
1958	I Accuse!	Gen. Mercier	
1958	Blood of the Vampire	Doctor Callistratus	
1959	Room at the Top	Mr. Brown	
1959	The Angry Hills	Dr. Stergion	
1959	The Rough and the Smooth	Lord Drewell	
1959	The House of the Seven Hawks	Inspector Van Der Stoor	
1960	The Hands of Orlac	Professor Volchett	
1961	The Mark	Andrew Clive	
1962	Lawrence of Arabia	General Archibald Murray	
1963	Dr. Crippen	R.D. Muir	
1964	Becket	Bishop Folliot	
1965	Ninety Degrees in the Shade	Bazant	
1965	Life at the Top	Abe Brown	
1966	The Sandwich Man	Car Salesman	
1968	The Charge of the Light Brigade	Macbeth in 'Macbeth'	
1968	Decline and Fall... of a Birdwatcher	Dr. Augustus Fagan	(final film role)

Wolfit can also be heard playing the title role in an abridged recording of King Lear for the Living Shakespeare series, with Coral Browne and Barbara Jefford as Goneril and Regan.

== Notes, references and sources ==
=== Sources ===
- Croall, Jonathan (2000). Gielgud – A Theatrical Life, 1904–2000. London: Methuen. ISBN 978-0-41-374560-6.
- Gaye, Freda, ed. (1967). Who's Who in the Theatre (fourteenth ed.). London: Sir Isaac Pitman and Sons. OCLC 5997224.
- Gielgud, John (2000) [1939 and 1989]. Gielgud on Gielgud – volume comprising reprints of Early Stages and Backward Glances. London: Hodder and Stoughton. ISBN 978-0-34-079502-6.
- Harwood, Ronald (1983). Sir Donald Wolfit, CBE. Oxford: Amber Lane Press. ISBN 978-0-90-639943-9.
- Hobson, Harold (1958). Ralph Richardson. London: Rockliff. OCLC 3797774.
- Morley, Sheridan (1986). The Great Stage Stars. London: Angus & Robertson. ISBN 978-0-8160-1401-9.
- Morley, Sheridan (2001). John G – The Authorised Biography of John Gielgud. London: Hodder and Stoughton. ISBN 978-0-34-036803-9.
- Rees, Nigel (2002). Quips, Slurs and Gaffes. London: Rigel Publications for Marks and Spencer. (no ISBN or OCLC number)
- Williamson, Audrey (1951). Theatre of Two Decades. London: Rockliffe. OCLC 67409885.
