= American Archive of Public Broadcasting =

Archive of radio and television public broadcasting

The American Archive of Public Broadcasting (AAPB) is a collaboration between the Library of Congress and WGBH Educational Foundation, founded through the efforts of the Corporation for Public Broadcasting (CPB). The AAPB is a national effort to digitally preserve and make accessible historically significant public radio and television programs created over the past 70+ years. The archive comprises over 120 collections from contributing stations and original producers from US states and territories. As of April 2020, the collection includes nearly 113,000 digitized items preserved on-site at the Library of Congress, and 53,000 items in the collection are streaming online in the AAPB Online Reading Room.

Funders include the CPB, the Council on Library and Information Resources, and Institute of Museum and Library Services.

== History ==
External videos
- General introduction and history
- Casey Davis: Why Archive Public Media?, 2016, 19:48, GBH Forum Network
- Karen Cariani: The History of Public Media and the AAPB, 2016, 29:42, GBH Forum Network

External media
- Example of online content

Audio
- The American Town: A Self-Portrait: Durand, Michigan, 1967, 29:50, American Archive of Public Broadcasting

Video
- Prospects of Mankind with Eleanor Roosevelt; What Status For Women?, 59:07, 1962. Eleanor Roosevelt, chair of the Commission, interviews President John F. Kennedy, Secretary of Labor Arthur Goldberg and others, WGBH Open Vault via AAPB

The Corporation for Public Broadcasting (CPB) began inventorying US public media content in 2007. By 2013, 2.5 million items had been inventoried including 40,000 hours of broadcasting which was being digitized with funding from the CPB. An advisory council, which included Ken Burns, John W. Carlin, Henry Louis Gates Jr., Cokie Roberts, Stephen D. Smith, Margaret Spellings, Howard Stringer, and Jesús Salvador Treviño, recommended that a collaboration between WGBH and the Library of Congress form and operate the archive.

In the first phase of the project, which began in 2013, the Archive will complete the digitization of 40,000 hours of radio and television programs and select an additional 5,000 hours of born-digital programs to be included in the collection. The collection will be made available to the public on-site in Washington, D.C. and in Boston. A rights clearance strategy will be developed to comply with legal restrictions, including copyright law and a website will provide public access to much of the collection.

=== Other projects ===
Programs from National Educational Television (NET), which operated from 1952 through 1972, are being cataloged in a project scheduled to be completed in 2018. 8,000–10,000 NET titles are expected to be cataloged and an incomplete preliminary list is currently online.

The PBS NewsHour Digitization Project has made more than 13,500 episodes of PBS NewsHour and its predecessor programs available online. Transcripts of over 9,000 shows (1975–2015) will also be made available.

The Public Broadcasting Preservation Fellowship (PBPF) began in 2018 and supports graduate students enrolled in non-specialized programs to pursue digital preservation projects at public broadcasting organizations around the country. In 2020, the University of Alabama partnered with WGBH to adopt and launch its model of the PBPF program, providing both local and remote students enrolled in the University of Alabama's School of Library and Information Studies with opportunities to pursue Fellowships at stations in their area.

In 2021, the AAPB launched the “Presenting the Past" podcast series in collaboration with the Society for Cinema and Media Studies (SCMS). The series features informed conversations with scholars, educators, industry professionals, researchers, archivists, and others about significant events, issues, and topics documented in the AAPB collections.

== Special Collections and Exhibits ==
The AAPB Special Collections include notable selections of public radio and television content with a specified search bar for items within the collection, a detailed summary of the content, and related resources. Some of these collections feature individual series such as Say Brother (now known as Basic Black), raw interviews from documentaries such as Eyes on the Prize and Ken Burns' The Civil War, event coverage such as the Watergate Hearings, and selections of items related to specific themes, such as the LGBT+ Collection.

In the AAPB curated Exhibits, curators select primary and secondary source recordings to present a diversity of perspectives concerning the exhibit's focus. These exhibits illuminate how public broadcasting stations and producers have covered topics such as civil rights, climate change, speaking and protesting in America, public media and presidential elections, structuring news magazines, televising Black politics, and historic preservation on public broadcasting.

== See also ==
- National Public Broadcasting Archives
- PBCore
