= Douglas Gomery =

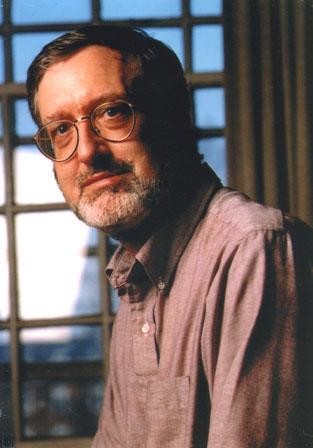

Douglas Gomery is Resident Scholar at the Broadcasting Archives at the University of Maryland and professor emeritus at the Philip Merrill College of Journalism at the University of Maryland in College Park. He holds a doctorate in communications from the University of Wisconsin and has taught mass media history at the University of Wisconsin, Northwestern University, New York University, the University of Utrecht (the Netherlands), and the University of Maryland.

Gomery has written for the Village Voice, Modern Maturity, The Wilson Quarterly, The Baltimore Sun and other newspapers. He is a former senior researcher for the Woodrow Wilson International Center for Scholars Media Studies project, and is the author of 21 (his 22nd will be published July, 2013) books on the history and economics of the cinema and broadcasting in the United States, as well as several hundred articles. He also wrote the "Business of Broadcasting" column for the American Journalism Review (1995–2000).

== Bibliography ==
- Patsy Cline: The Making of an Icon, published in March 2011
- A History of Broadcasting in the United States (2008)
- Shared Pleasures: A History Of Movie Presentation In The United States (1992)
- The Hollywood Studio System (1986, 2005 (expanded and rewritten))
  - translated into French as Hollywood : l'âge d'or des studios ISBN 978-2-86642-049-9
  - translated into Spanish as Hollywood, el sistema de estudios ISBN 978-84-404-9218-0
- Film History: Theory and practice, (with Robert Allen) (1985)
- The Coming of Sound: A History (1975, 2005)
