= Broadcasting Archives at the University of Maryland =

Coordinates: 38.988123°N 76.941617°W

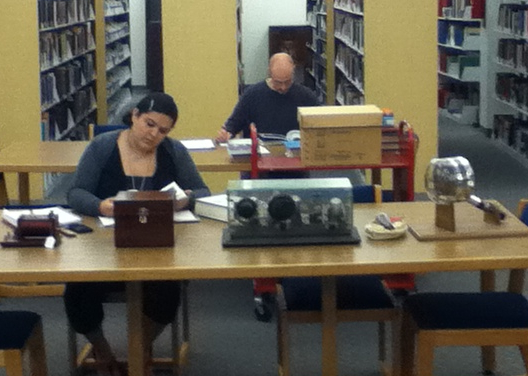
Students, scholars and broadcast professionals may study a wealth of material and artifacts at the Broadcasting Archives.

The Broadcasting Archives at the University of Maryland is home to several collections – the National Public Broadcasting Archives and the Library of American Broadcasting among them – housed together on the campus of the University of Maryland in College Park. Among the other holdings is the unusual Art Gliner Humor Collection, since humor plays such an important part in the history of radio and television programming.

Douglas Gomery, professor emeritus at Maryland's Philip Merrill College of Journalism, is Resident Scholar at the Archives. He donated his papers and some 5,000 books to the Broadcasting Archives when he retired from teaching in 2005. Gomery served on the committee that put the Broadcasting Archives in place, and considers the Archives the proudest achievement of his 25-year career at Maryland. He describes the collection as one of the top five research collections for the study of radio and television in the United States.

Other scholars who have donated their libraries and papers to the Broadcasting Archives include John M. Kittross and Christopher H. Sterling. The Archives also holds extensive books and papers from the National Association of Broadcasters and is actively growing its collection of materials concerning broadcast media in Washington, D.C. (The Pick Temple collection – from the popular 1950s children's show on WTOP – is currently being accessioned.)

The Broadcasting Archives is located in Hornbake Library on the campus of the University of Maryland in College Park, just off the northeast corner of Washington, D.C. The Broadcasting Archives is a unit of the Archives and Manuscripts Department of the Collection Management and Special Collections Division, University of Maryland Libraries.
