= Charles Doran =

Irish actor (1877–1964)

Doran as Hamlet

Charles Doran (1 January 1877 – 5 April 1964) was an Irish actor, one of the last of the touring actor-managers in the tradition of Frank Benson, John Martin-Harvey and Ben Greet. Among those who joined his company at the start of their careers were Cecil Parker, Ralph Richardson, Francis L Sullivan and Donald Wolfit.

Doran toured with Benson and other managements, and played in the West End before setting up his own company in 1920. He led it for eleven years, before leaving Britain to work in India. On his return he worked on stage and made occasional television appearances.

== Life and career ==
Doran was born on 1 January 1877 in Cork, the son of Charles Jenkins Doran. He was educated in Cork and privately. In 1899 he made his stage debut as a member of Frank Benson's touring company, in Julius Caesar at the Theatre Royal, Belfast. He remained with Benson for two and a half years, during which he made his London debut, as Captain MacMorris in Henry V at the Lyceum.

In 1903 Doran toured in a stage version of Tolstoy's Resurrection . He was engaged by Fred Terry and Julia Neilson, and appeared at the New Theatre in 1905, as the Comte de Tournai in The Scarlet Pimpernel. In 1906, touring with H B Irving he made his first appearance in the US, and the following year toured in South Africa with Cora Urquhart Brown-Potter's company. In 1907 he returned to Benson's company. In 1908 he toured with Mrs Patrick Campbell in The Thunderbolt, and The Second Mrs Tanqueray. During 1909–10 he toured England and Australia with Oscar Asche and Lily Brayton (both former members of Benson's troupe). His parts included the title role in The Merchant of Venice, Lodovico in Othello, Tranio in The Taming of the Shrew and the Soothsayer in Julius Caesar.

In October 1910, returning to England, Doran played La Tribe in Count Hannibal at the New Theatre, after which he was Pistol in The Merry Wives of Windsor at the Garrick to the Falstaff of Asche. For the next ten years he played in new, ephemeral works, interspersed with classics. Among his roles in the latter were Constantine Levin in Anna Karenina (1913); Douglas in Henry IV, part 1 and the Constable of France in Henry V. (1914) in London, and a variety of Shakespeare parts at the Memorial Theatre, Stratford-on-Avon (1919).

In February 1920 he began touring with his own Shakespearean company, playing Hamlet, Shylock in The Merchant of Venice, Brutus in Julius Caesar, Malvolio in Twelfth Night, Prospero in The Tempest, Petruchio in The Taming of the Shrew, Macbeth, Falstaff, Henry V, and Jaques in As You Like It. He had a keen eye for rising talent, and among his recruits were Noel Streatfeild, Cecil Parker, Ralph Richardson, Edith Sharpe, Norman Shelley, Abraham Sofaer, Francis L Sullivan and Donald Wolfit.

In 1931 he went to India as director of Shakespeare's plays at the State Theatre in Jhalawar and then on to Bombay where he performed primarily in Shakespeare on the radio. He returned to England in 1937. His last London appearance was in Song of Norway (1949). His last Shakespearean role in the theatre was Time in The Winter's Tale (1951). He continued to act on stage in other parts until 1954. He appeared on BBC television as a senator in Othello in 1950 and Adabashev, the tragedian in Curtain Down in 1952.

Doran died in Folkestone on the south coast of England on 5 April 1964, at the age of 87. An article on him published by Emory University in 2003 sums up his career thus:

On stage in one role or another, Doran's fifty-seven years in the theatre made him a major force in the profession, particularly in his productions of Shakespeare. Such was his energy and enthusiasm that he kept alive for a few more years the actor-manager system when the major talents, men like Tree, Benson, and Irving, had dissolved their companies. Doran was indeed the last of his theatrical breed.

== Sources ==
- Hobson, Harold (1958). Ralph Richardson. London: Rockliff. OCLC 3797774.
- Parker, John (1925). Who's Who in the Theatre (fifth ed.). London: Sir Isaac Pitman and Sons. OCLC 10013159.
