= The Lord of the Rings (1979 radio series) =

1979 radio series

National Public Radio broadcast a dramatization of J. R. R. Tolkien's The Lord of the Rings in 1979. It was produced by The Mind's Eye. It was produced by Bob Lewis and adapted for radio by Bernard Mayes.

== Production ==
The radio script of The Lord of the Rings was written by Bernard Mayes. It is notable for including the Tom Bombadil scenes (with the character voiced by Mayes himself), unlike many other adaptations of the book. The broadcasts totaled more than 11 hours. The SF-Worlds review commented that the local Virginia theater players had difficulty pronouncing the names of characters and places, and that the unsophisticated mid-20th century style production would seem "remote" to fans of Peter Jackson's films.

== Recordings ==
The most widely circulated US edition comes in a wooden box, whether on compact discs or cassette tapes.

The newer editions of the drama on compact disc and MP3 have a somewhat shorter running time than the original cassettes, omitting or condensing a considerable amount of dialogue and narration.

== Cast ==
- James Arrington - Frodo Baggins, Saruman
- Lou Bliss - Sam
- Pat Franklyn - Merry, Ioreth
- Mac McCaddon - Pippin, Galadriel
- Ray Reinhardt - Bilbo Baggins
- Bernard Mayes - Gandalf, Tom Bombadil
- Tom Luce - Strider/Aragorn, Treebeard, Denethor
- Gail Chugg - Narrator, Gimli, Gollum, Barliman Butterbur
- John Vickery - Legolas, Faramir, Wormtongue, Mouth of Sauron
- Bob Lewis - Wild Man, Glorfindel
- Erik Bauersfeld - Boromir, Theoden
- Carl Hague - Elrond, Beregond
- Matthew Locricchio - Eomer
- Karen Hurley - Eowyn
