= Bernard Mayes =

British broadcaster, academic and writer (1929–2014)

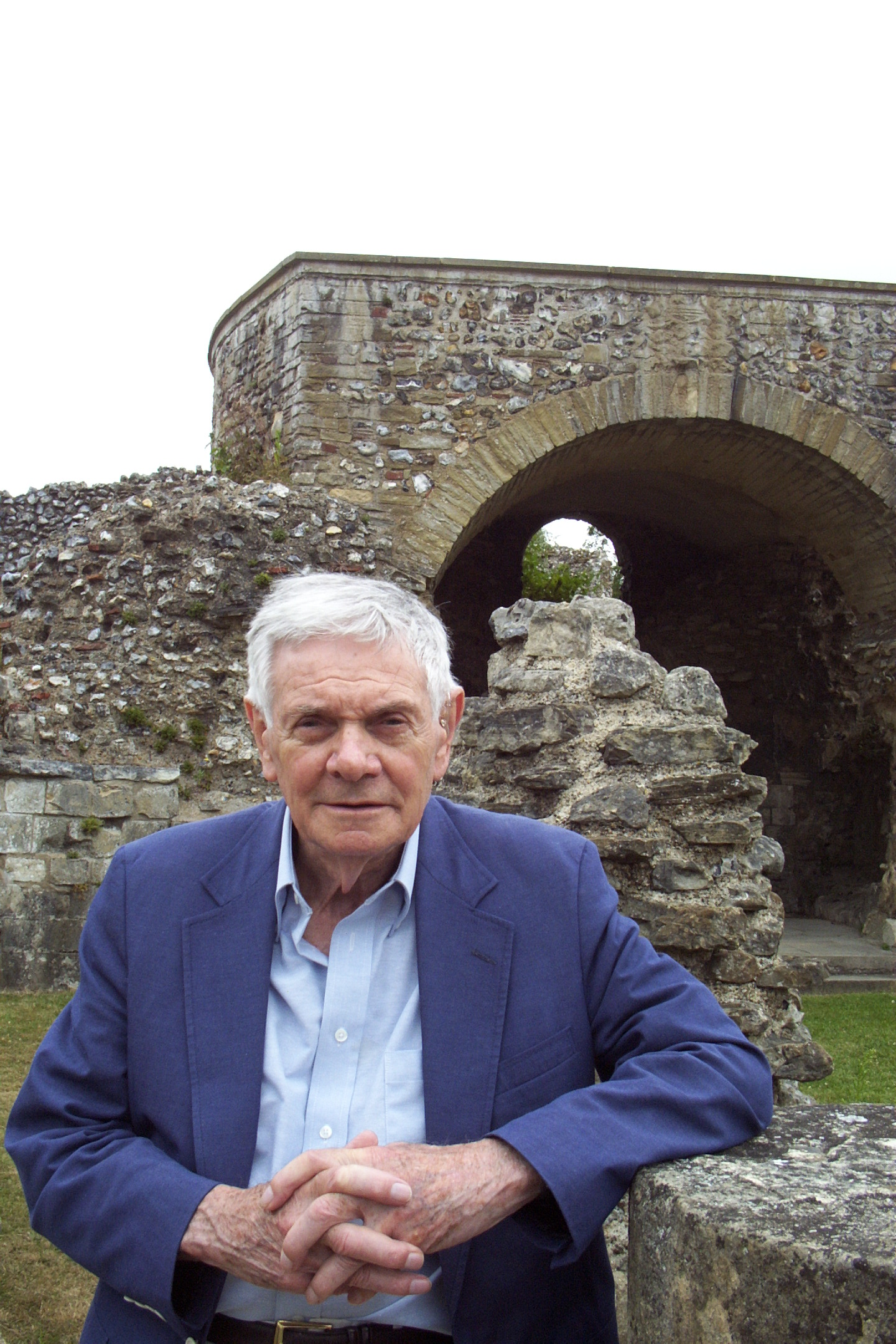
Bernard Mayes in 2006

Anthony Bernard Duncan Mayes (10 October 1929 – 23 October 2014) was a British broadcaster, university dean and author. In the United States, he founded KQED-FM, was Executive Vice President of KQED TV, then co-founded and became first working chairman of National Public Radio. He also founded one of America's first suicide prevention hotlines.

== Biography ==
Born in London, Mayes was educated at University College School. After studying classical civilizations at Downing College, Cambridge, he worked first as a school teacher of Latin, Greek and history. He was then ordained as an Anglican priest. Mayes emigrated to the United States in 1958 and became an Episcopal worker-priest and director of a student house attached to Judson Memorial Church in Greenwich Village and New York University. He then moved to the Diocese of California where he held a parish near San Francisco. While in San Francisco, Mayes founded San Francisco Suicide Prevention, a suicide prevention hotline, which was later used as a model throughout the United States. Fliers were posted around the city "Thinking of ending it all? Call Bruce" with a listed phone number. Mayes, using the pseudonym "Bruce", provided an unconditional, supportive listener to callers. Openly gay himself, Mayes organized a sexuality study center for the Episcopal Diocese of California. This ministry, originally known as the Parsonage, was awarded the Episcopal Jubilee citation and later evolved into the present-day Oasis organization. In 1992 he abandoned religion and became an atheist. In 2012, despite his atheism he was later honored by the San Francisco Night Ministry and both the California Assembly and Senate for his public service.

Invited in 1984 to join the Rhetoric and Communication Studies faculty of the University of Virginia, in 1991 he was appointed assistant dean in the College of Arts and Sciences, and then chair of the Communications department, finally founding the Program in Media Studies. He was awarded the Sullivan/Harrison award for mentoring and received a commendation by the University Seven Society. On retiring from the university in 1999 he published his autobiography Escaping God's Closet, which received the Lambda Literary Award for religion and spirituality, and in 2000 University of Virginia alumni named the Bernard D. Mayes Award after him. His papers are kept in the National Public Broadcasting Archives of the University of Maryland, the Albert and Shirley Small Special Collections Library, and in the Library of Congress.

In 1991 he co-founded the Lesbian, Gay, Bisexual, Transsexual Faculty, Staff and Graduate Student Association at the University of Virginia, known as UVA Pride. On his retirement in 1999, the University of Virginia's Queer Alumni Network (known as QVA) gave Mayes a lifetime achievement award for his accomplishments and for his contributions to UVA in particular. Each year since then, QVA has honored a distinguished graduate of UVA with a Bernard D. Mayes Award for service and leadership in the LGBT community. Mayes also received a lifetime achievement award from San Francisco Suicide Prevention. In 2010 he was given a prestigious Jefferson Award for Public Service, most notably for his suicide prevention work still used as a model nationwide. He last resided in San Francisco.

=== Broadcasting career ===
Beginning in 1958, Mayes worked as a journalist for the BBC and other networks including, from 1964 to 1968, KPFA-FM in Berkeley, California. In 1968 he helped organize the public broadcasting system in the United States, becoming first the founder of KQED-FM and Executive Vice President of KQED TV in San Francisco, then a co-founder and first working chairman of National Public Radio. He then became a consultant for the Corporation for Public Broadcasting in Washington, D.C., advising universities and communities across the country.

Mayes's dramatic works included: Homer's Odyssey, the Agamemnon of Aeschylus and Plato's Phaedo, each adapted from the original Greek; The Lord of the Rings, a 1979 radio series in which he played the part of Gandalf; and several of Dickens' novels. Mayes received financial support from the National Endowment for the Arts for a dramatization of the life of Thomas Jefferson. He also recorded several books for Blackstone Audio (including Gibbon's Decline and Fall of the Roman Empire, Augustine's Confessions and The City of God, Mises's Human Action, Plutarch's Lives, and Boswell's Life of Samuel Johnson) and was often heard in The Black Mass, Erik Bauersfeld's series of dramatic adaptations for KPFA. An illustrated collection of Mayes's lighter broadcast pieces was published in 1985 under the title This is Bernard Mayes in San Francisco.

== Death ==
Mayes died on 23 October 2014, of sepsis.
