= The Lord of the Rings (1955 radio series) =

Radio play

The script was rediscovered in 2022. This sheet, handwritten by J. R. R. Tolkien, includes Frodo's exclamation O Elbereth! Gilthoniel!.

During 1955 and 1956, a condensed radio dramatisation of The Lord of the Rings, adapted and produced by Terence Tiller, was broadcast in two series of six episodes each on BBC Radio's the Third Programme. These radio broadcasts were the first dramatisation of The Lord of the Rings, a book by J. R. R. Tolkien, the final volume of which, The Return of the King, had been published in October 1955. The script had been thought lost, but it was rediscovered in the BBC archives in 2022.

The cast included Norman Shelley as Gandalf and Tom Bombadil, Felix Felton as Bilbo and Sauron and Robert Farquharson as Saruman and Denethor.

The adaptation had a mixed reception from newspaper critics at the time. The radio audience welcomed the first series, where Tiller had selected which scenes to use and which to cut; the audience was far more critical of the second series, where Tiller had compressed many scenes. Tolkien did not like the broadcasts, or the BBC's panel of critics.

== Context ==
J. R. R. Tolkien was an English author and philologist of ancient Germanic languages, specialising in Old English; he spent much of his career as a professor at the University of Oxford. He is best known for his novels about his invented Middle-earth, The Hobbit and The Lord of the Rings, and for the posthumously published The Silmarillion which provides a more mythical narrative about earlier ages. A devout Roman Catholic, he described The Lord of the Rings as "a fundamentally religious and Catholic work", rich in Christian symbolism.

The BBC, founded in 1922, is the largest and oldest British public service broadcaster. It is headquartered in London, England.

== Broadcast history ==
During 1955 and 1956, BBC Radio's Third Programme, a cultural and music channel, broadcast a condensed radio dramatisation of The Lord of the Rings in twelve episodes. These radio broadcasts were the first dramatisation of J. R. R. Tolkien's epic 1954–55 fantasy The Lord of the Rings. Since the BBC did not generally keep long-term archives of its productions at that time, no copies of the full adaptation are known to have survived. However, the opening theme of the series survives in a single clip from a 2016 radio special. Although virtually all audio of the series is lost, and the script too had been thought lost, the Tolkien scholar Stuart Lee rediscovered the full script for the dramatization in the BBC archives, including annotations by Tolkien himself, in 2022. Lee's research on the script was published as an essay in The Great Tales Never End: Essays in Memory of Christopher Tolkien (2022). The broadcasts were adapted and produced by Terence Tiller, who corresponded with Tolkien for advice concerning the second series.

Radio was the dominant broadcast medium in the United Kingdom at the time, and the broadcasts helped to publicise the book. The broadcasts were discussed on the BBC programme The Critics. The broadcasts brought the book to the attention of a man named Sam Gamgee, surprising Tolkien as his name was that of a Lord of the Rings character. Gamgee wrote to Tolkien to ask about the origin of the character's name, to which Tolkien replied with a full explanation of its real and its fictitious etymology.

== Content ==
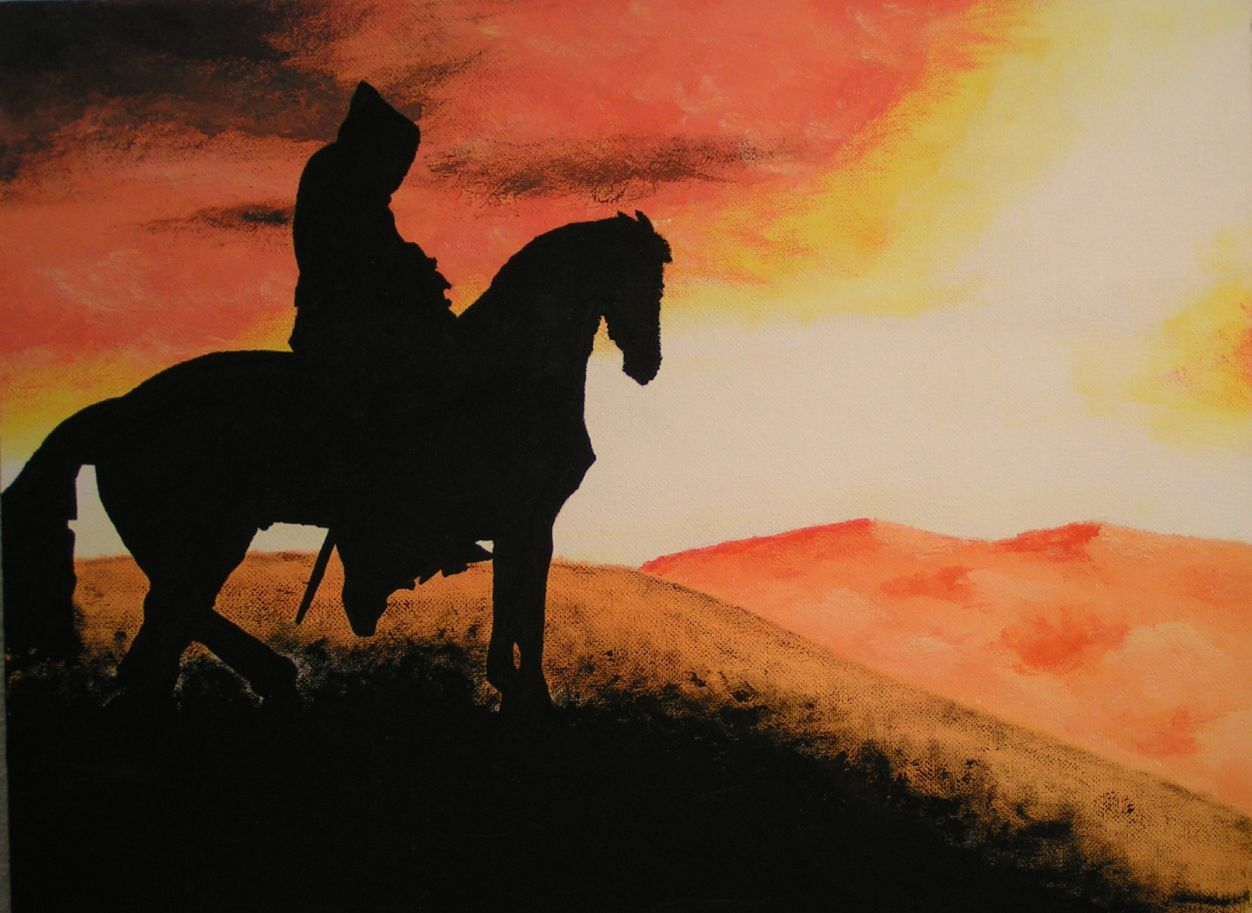
Artist's impression of a Nazgûl, depicted as a shadowy but solid body, cloaked and hooded in black, wearing a sword, and mounted on a black horse

The rediscovered script shows Tiller's construction of the radio series. A sheet in Tolkien's handwriting shows that he rewrote a scene soon after the Nazgûl confrontation scene on Weathertop, in which the hobbit Frodo Baggins is stabbed by their leader, who had once been the Witch-king of Angmar, with a Morgul-knife. Among the descriptions on the sheet for the narrator to voice, Tolkien redrafted the dialogue:

Frodo: What has happened? Where is the pale King?
Sam: We lost you, Mr Frodo. Where did you get to?
Frodo: Didn’t you see them? – the wraiths, and the King?
Aragorn: No, only their shadows…

== Cast ==
The cast for the series was:

- Derek Hart – Narrator
- Oliver Burt – Frodo
- Norman Shelley – Gandalf, Tom Bombadil, Old Man, Additional voices
- Victor Platt – Sam
- Godfrey Kenton – Aragorn, Mablung, Additional voices
- Michael Collins – Merry
- Basil Jones – Pippin
- Felix Felton – Bilbo, Sauron, Witch-king of Angmar ("The Black Captain"), Orcs, Additional voices
- Derek Prentice – Boromir, Faramir, Beregond, Orcs, Additional voices
- Frank Duncan – Legolas, Halbarad, Additional voices
- Eric Lugg – Gimli, Additional voices
- Gerik Schjelderup – Gollum, Orcs
- Robert Farquharson – Saruman, Denethor
- Valentine Dyall – Théoden, Treebeard, Orcs
- Bernard Rebel – Wormtongue
- Garard Green – Elrond, Celeborn, Additional voices
- Nicolette Bernard – Galadriel, Goldberry
- John Baker – Orcs
- Olive Gregg – Eowyn
- David Hemmings – Bergil
- Noel Johnson – Éomer
- Prunella Scales – Ioreth
- Roger Snowdon – Orcs

== Reception ==
=== Critics and the public ===
The critic Paul Ferris wrote in 1955 in The Observer that the first series offered "the best light listening for the next five weeks ... [with the] pure quality of fairy-tale ... charming without being slight". Lee records that another early review in an unknown newspaper, preserved in the BBC archives, stated that the "relaxed, vivid, and masculine style" of Tolkien's writing somehow adapted quite naturally to the medium of radio. The reviewer was comfortable, too, with the passages voiced by the narrator, saying that even in explanations Tolkien was able to hold the listener's attention. Listeners' reactions were analysed by the BBC's audience researchers in the 1950s. They found that 1 adult in 1000 in Britain had listened in. For the first series, audience appreciation had by the last episode reached 64 out of 100 from an initial score of 56, against an average for all programmes on the channel of 65.

Lee added that most of the recorded comments were very positive. He notes that listeners were divided about whether the series was "a milestone in BBC history", or a waste of listeners' time on a serious channel playing material meant for children. Overall, listeners enjoyed the first series, where Tiller had followed Tolkien's advice to make a selection of scenes and cut the rest. They were far more critical of the second series, where Tiller had compressed many scenes, resulting in what a self-described "Civil Servant" called "a footling and ridiculous sounding adventure story of the 'with one bound Jack was free' type".

=== Tolkien's opinion ===
Tolkien had had, in Lee's words, "a long and strained relationship with the BBC", starting in 1936 with a broadcast of his modern English version of the medieval poem Pearl. Tolkien from the start was sceptical about reducing nearly 400 pages of The Lord of the Rings to less than five hours of radio. He stated directly that he would prefer scenes to be cut rather than compressed to mere summaries.

Tolkien's opinion on these broadcasts was revealed in several of his letters. In November 1955, he told Molly Waldron that he believed that the book was "quite unsuitable for 'dramatization', and have not enjoyed the broadcasts—though they have improved. I thought Tom Bombadil dreadful—but worse still was the announcer's preliminary remarks that Goldberry was his daughter (!), and that Willowman was an ally of Mordor (!!)."

The following month, Tolkien wrote to the novelist Naomi Mitchison "I think poorly of the broadcast adaptations. Except for a few details I think they are not well done, even granted the script and the legitimacy of the enterprise (which I do not grant). But they took some trouble with the names. I thought that the dwarf (Glóin not Gimli [...]) was not too bad, if a bit exaggerated." The same day, he wrote to Rayner Unwin that he "agreed with the [newspaper] 'critics' view of the radio adaptation" but was "annoyed" that they should "turn their attention" on him and the book when they admitted they had not read it. Further, he found the speakers on the BBC's programme The Critics "intolerable with a superiority that only ignorance can maintain". However, he noted that the review in The Times "was appreciative". As for the radio series itself, Tiller had in his view "managed excellently" with the Elves and the Council of Elrond, but had wrongly made Bilbo Baggins sound bored.

In November 1956, Tolkien wrote to Tiller concerning the accents to be used in the production of a second series: "I paid great attention to such linguistic differentiation as was possible: in diction, idiom and so on; and I doubt if much more can be imported, except in so far as the individual actor represents his feeling for the character in tone and style." A few days later, he wrote to Tiller again concerning scripts for three of the episodes, saying, "Here is a book very unsuitable for dramatic or semi-dramatic representation. If that is attempted, it needs more space, a lot of space. ... Personally, I think it requires rather the older art of the reading 'mime', than the more nearly dramatic, which results in too great an emphasis on dialogue (mostly with its setting removed). ... I feel you have had a very hard task."

Tolkien was unimpressed by the results. Replying to Rayner Unwin in 1957 concerning an enquiry about the possibility of making a cartoon of The Lord of the Rings, he wrote: "I think I should find vulgarization less painful than the sillification achieved by the B.B.C."

== Sources ==
- Carpenter, Humphrey (1977). J. R. R. Tolkien: A Biography. New York: Ballantine Books. ISBN 978-0-04-928037-3.
- Carpenter, Humphrey, ed. (2023) [1981]. The Letters of J. R. R. Tolkien: Revised and Expanded Edition. New York: HarperCollins. ISBN 978-0-35-865298-4.
- Lee, Stuart D. (2022). "A Milestone in BBC History? The 1955-56 Radio Dramatization of The Lord of the Rings". In Ovenden, Richard; McIlwaine, Catherine (eds.). The Great Tales Never End: Essays in Memory of Christopher Tolkien. Bodleian Library Publishing. ISBN 978-1-8512-4565-9. Also available online.
