= Edythe Meserand =

American broadcast journalist

Edythe Meserand (1908-1997) was a pioneer in broadcast journalism for women and founding member of the American Women in Radio and Television (AWRT), the oldest established professional association dedicated to advancing women in broadcasting.

== Biography ==
Edythe Meserand was born in Philadelphia, Pennsylvania in 1908 but grew up in the Bronx and Long Island, New York. She began her career at the National Broadcasting Company in 1926 in their press office. From 1931-37 Meserand worked for the Hearst radio stations as the director of promotions and the ''Musical Clock Girl'' on WGBS, the forerunner of WINS in New York City.

Meserand left and became assistant news director of WOR, making her one of the first women in radio to assign reporters and shape the news broadcast. She helped design what is considered today the modern radio newsroom and produced some of the first radio news documentaries that used authentic background sounds. She took over the department when her supervisor, David Driscoll, became a war correspondent in WWII.

In 1951 she became a founder of American Women in Radio and Television, and served as its first president. Throughout her career, Meserand collected many accolades, including Peabody and Freedom Foundation awards for her radio documentary work, she was also honored by the Northeast Area Conference of American Women in Radio and Television for her 50 years in the industry.

She retired from WOR in 1952 and moved to a Christmas tree farm in Windy Hill, Charleston, New York with her partner, Jane Barton. In her retirement she continued to lead an active life, starting an advertising agency where she managed radio and television campaigns for Mary Anne Krupsak, the former Lieutenant Governor of New York. In the 1970s, Meserand became her town historian and the founding chairman of the Charleston Historical Society in 1978 where she helped to save the town's first Baptist church.

Edythe Meserand died at age 88 on June 2, 1997.
