= Norman Shelley =

British actor (1903–1980)

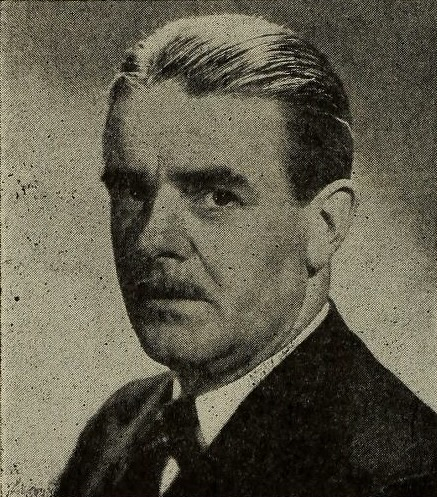
- Shelley circa. 1947
- Born: 16 February 1903; Chelsea, London, U.K.
- Died: 21 August 1980 (aged 77); Royal Free Hospital, Hampstead, London, U.K.
- Occupation: Actor
- Spouse: Monica Daphne nee Brett

Norman Shelley (16 February 1903 – 21 August 1980) was a British actor, best known for his work in radio, in particular for the BBC's Children's Hour. He also had a recurring role as Colonel Danby in the long-running radio soap opera The Archers.

Perhaps Shelley's single best-known role was as Winnie-the-Pooh in Children's Hour adaptations of A.A. Milne's stories; for many British people of the mid-20th century, his is the definitive voice of Pooh. Other roles for Children's Hour included Dr. Watson (opposite Carleton Hobbs as Holmes) in the 1952–1969 Sherlock Holmes radio series; Toad in Kenneth Grahame's The Wind in the Willows; and the role of Dennis the Dachshund in the specially written Toytown series. Shelley also played the parts of Gandalf and Tom Bombadil in the 1955-56 radio adaptation of J. R. R. Tolkien's The Lord of the Rings. In the 1973 BBC television series Jack the Ripper Shelley played Detective Constable Walter Dew.

== Life and career ==
Shelley was born in Chelsea, London, the son of Frank Shelley, a painter, and his wife, Alice Campbell, née Glover. He originally intended to make a career as an aircraft designer, but took up stage acting on the advice of the actress and teacher Rosina Fillipi. His public debut was at the Old Vic in 1919, and in the early 1920s he toured with the Charles Doran Shakespeare Company, performing such roles as Trebonius in Julius Caesar and Sebastian in Twelfth Night. During the 1920s and early '30s he worked principally in London, and was particularly associated with Peter Godfrey's experimental productions at the Gate Theatre Studio.

Shelley's first BBC broadcast was in 1926, having earlier made a reputation in radio in Australia and New Zealand. By the late '30s he established a reputation as a respected and versatile British radio actor. In 1937 he married Monica Daphne, née Brett. During the Second World War he was a member of the BBC's wartime repertory company, but left to serve as a ferry pilot in the Air Transport Auxiliary. He worked regularly under producer director Raymond Raikes.

In the 1930s and '40s he was a Children's Hour regular, famous as Dennis the Dachshund in earlier episodes of Toytown, and as Winnie-the-Pooh, whom he first played in 1939. For seventeen years, he played Dr Watson alongside Carleton Hobbs's Sherlock Holmes from October 1952 to July 1969. Their long-running series of adaptations aired on the Home Service and later, the Light Programme.

In the late 1950s he took part in recorded dramatised versions by Argo Records of Alice in Wonderland (1958) and Through the Looking-Glass, both directed by Douglas Cleverdon and both starring Jane Asher in the title role. For the same company he also recorded his impersonation of Toad in The Wind in the Willows (1960) with Richard Goolden as Mole.

Late in life he found new fame as Colonel Freddy Danby in the BBC radio serial The Archers. He was still recording episodes of The Archers at the time of his death. He collapsed suddenly at Finchley Road tube station, London, on 21 August 1980, and was declared dead in the Royal Free Hospital, Hampstead. His wife had predeceased him; he was buried near her at Long Hanborough, Oxfordshire, on 28 August.

== Churchill impersonation ==
A recurring rumour holds that, because the House of Commons was not set up for location recording at that time, some of Winston Churchill's most famous speeches to Parliament during the Second World War were subsequently recorded for radio broadcast by Shelley, impersonating Churchill. The rumour has been promoted by David Irving, to support his unflattering view of Churchill.

It is difficult to prove or disprove Irving's claims. Analysis of the voice patterns in 20 of Churchill's recorded speeches show that three made in May and June 1940 do not match those provably by him, although Churchill might have recorded them after his voice had changed. According to one source, it is unproven whether Shelley is the speaker and, if so, whether the speeches were broadcast as having been spoken by Churchill.

One report states Shelley did record a performance of Churchill's "We shall fight on the beaches" speech. which is claimed to be one of the three non-matching speeches, However, Shelley's 78rpm record is dated 7 September 1942, whereas Churchill's speech was broadcast on 4 June 1940, key parts being read out by a BBC announcer. Shelley claimed that, with Churchill's permission, he did once voice Churchill for an introduction to a wartime propaganda film for distribution overseas, because the Prime Minister could not find time for the necessary visit to the studio.

According to Shelley's great friend, former BBC radio and TV producer and presenter, Trevor Hill, Shelley did stand in for Churchill on at least three occasions, specifically when Churchill was ill or out of the country. That would never have been divulged at the time. Shelley's party piece, apparently often requested, was for everyone to close their eyes while he impersonated Churchill, and on those occasions, according to Hill, it was impossible to tell the difference.

In 1949, Churchill re-recorded most of his speeches at his home at Chartwell. The EMI engineer responsible for the recordings has told the BECTU History Project that he used one of the then new British Tape Recorders, and that Churchill usually did the recording in bed, so the speeches have a more relaxed air than the original broadcast. They are often the versions that are played today.

== Selected filmography ==
- Down River (1931) as Blind Rudley
- East Lynne on the Western Front (1931)
- The River Wolves (1934) as Jim Spiller
- The Iron Duke (1934) as Pozzo di Borgo
- Went the Day Well? (1942) as Bob Owen (uncredited)
- They Came to a City (1944) as Mr Cudworth
- Strawberry Roan (1944) as Dr. Lambert
- I Know Where I'm Going! (1945) as Sir Robert Bellinger (voice)
- We of the West Riding Archived 25 April 2012 at the Wayback Machine (1945) as narrator
- I See a Dark Stranger (1946) as Man in Straw Hat
- Dancing with Crime (1947) as Stage Door Keeper (uncredited)
- The Silver Darlings (1947) as Hendry
- Daughter of Darkness (1948) as Smithers
- The Monkey's Paw (1948) as Monoghan
- Vote for Huggett (1949) as Mr. Wilson
- The Blue Lamp (1950) as F. P. Jordan (uncredited)
- Her Favourite Husband (1950) as Mr. Dobson
- I'll Get You for This (1951) as Mr. Langley (uncredited)
- Blind Man's Bluff (1952) as Superintendent Morley
- Private Information (1952) as Freemantle
- Strange Stories (1953) as Mr. Gilkie
- The Man Without a Body (1957) as Dr. Alexander
- The Price of Silence (1960) as Councilor Forbes
- Sink the Bismarck! (1960) as Winston Churchill (voice, uncredited)
- The Angry Silence (1960) as Seagrave
- Very Important Person (1961) as Fred Whittaker
- A Place to Go (1963) as Magistrate
- Otley (1968) as Businessman
- Oh! What a Lovely War (1969) as Staff Officer in Ballroom
- Frankenstein Must Be Destroyed (1969) as Guest – Smoking pipe
- Gulliver's Travels (1977) as Father / animation voices
