= Pick Temple =

20th-century American singer

Lafayette Parker "Pick" Temple (January 20, 1911 - December 21 1991) was an American cowboy folksinger who starred in The Pick Temple Giant Ranch television show from 1948 through 1961.

== Early life and career ==
Temple was born and grew up in the Washington, D.C., area.

Prior to his career in show business, Temple had been employed as an economic statistician in the Business Division of the U.S. Census Bureau for 20 years.

He entered an amateur hour contest on WTTG in which he sang and won the competition. A television station executive saw his performance and asked if he could perform a children's cowboy show.

== The Pick Temple Giant Ranch TV show ==
His children’s show featured his guitar playing and singing, puppet shows, cartoons, his pony Piccolo, and Lady, his Collie canine. Viewers sent postcards to Pick, hoping he might pick them as “Lucky rangers” to appear as guests on his show, sitting in the studio’s hayloft. Pick's opening greeting, "Heidi, Pardner!" was a tip of the hat to the Heidi Bakery, which was the bakery affiliated with the grocery chain. Children wishing to participate in the various games had to wave their hands wildly and shout "Heidi, Please!". The show aired on WMAL-TV, seven days per week, in the Washington, D. C. area and was sponsored by a local grocery store chain, Giant Food of Landover, Maryland.

== Appearance on The Rifleman ==
Temple also appeared on ABC-TV’s weekly Western series, The Rifleman, starring Chuck Connors as Lucas McCain. In the episode, “Honest Abe” (November 20, 1961), a friend of Lucas’ who resembled Abraham Lincoln stopped at a saloon in North Fork, New Mexico (the town closest to McCain’s ranch), for a drink of water. Temple played a guitarist who sang "Jimmy Crack Corn" also known as "Blue-Tailed Fly," with the saloon’s patrons. The townspeople—except for Matt Yordy—play along with the Lincoln look-alike, who claims that he is the president. Yordy is looking for a fight, and Abe obliges him.

== Library of Congress music archives contributions ==
During the Great Depression, Temple rode the rails, listening to the melancholic folksongs of the day, some of which, in 1948, he recorded for the Library of Congress’ music archives.

== Post-television career ==
After The Pick Temple Giant Ranch was cancelled in 1962 due to financial expense, he moved to Philadelphia, Pennsylvania, to try out a similar show there. However, due to lack of success, Temple retired from television in 1963.

Temple returned to government service, working for the Office of Economic Opportunity’s Public Affairs Section and as an audio-visual expert, producing motivational films for Volunteers in Service to America (VISTA). He retired and moved to Sun City, Arizona, in 1972.

Temple died in 1991 at the age of 80. His survivors include his son Park, his daughter Faye, and four grandchildren.

== Sound recording ==
- Pick Temple - 1950s Giant Food Opening
- Library of Congress audio recordings
