= Audrey Williamson (critic) =

British historical writer (1913–1986)

Audrey May Williamson (29 May 1913, Thornton Heath – 14 March 1986) was a British historical writer and "one of the most prolific theatre journalists of her time". In 1978, Williamson received the CWA Gold Dagger for Non-Fiction for The Mystery of the Princes.

== Life ==
Williamson started out as an actress, but according to her Times obituarist "her career in the theatre was restricted by a diminutive physique". As a journalist, she wrote on art and medieval history for Opera News, Theatre Arts Monthly and Drama. In the 1960s she lived in the United States, and was New York opera and ballet correspondent for the Times and the Sunday Times. After publishing a book on Thomas Paine in 1973, she served as vice president of the Thomas Paine Society.

After a period of poor health, she died in London, on 14 March 1986.

== Works ==
=== Non-Fiction ===
- Contemporary Ballet. London: Rockliff, 1946
- Ballet Renaissance. 1947. London: Golden Galley Press
- Old Vic Drama: A Twelve Years' Study of Plays and Players. London: Rockliff, 1948
- The Art of Ballet, London: Elek, 1950
- Theatre of Two Decades. London: Rockliff, 1951
- Gilbert and Sullivan Opera: A New Assessment. London: Rockliff 1953
- Contemporary Theatre, 1953–1956. London: Rockliff, 1956
- Paul Rogers. London: Rockliff, 1956
- (With Charles Landstone) The Bristol Old Vic: The First Ten Years, London: J. Garnet Miller, 1957
- Old Vic Drama 2, 1947 –1957, London: Rockliff, 1957
- Ballet of 3 Decades. London: Rockliff, 1958
- Wagner Opera. London: J. Calder, 1962
- Bernard Shaw: Man and Writer. London: Collier-Macmillan, 1963
- Thomas Paine: His Life, Work, and Times. London: George Allen & Unwin, 1973
- Wilkes: A Friend to Liberty . London: George Allen & Unwin, 1974
- Artists and Writers in Revolt: The Pre-Raphaelites. Newton Abbot: David and Charles, 1976
- The Mystery of the Princes: An Investigation into a Supposed Murder. Dursley: Alan Sutton, 1978

=== Fiction ===
- Funeral March for Siegfried: A Richard York Detective Novel. London: Elek, 1979
- Death of a Theatre Filly: A Richard York Detective Novel. London: Elek, 1980
