= National Public Broadcasting Archives =

Coordinates: 38°59′17.5″N 76°56′29.5″W

The National Public Broadcasting Archives (NPBA) – housed as part of the Broadcasting Archives at the University of Maryland – preserves the history of American non-commercial broadcasting materials. It is housed at the University of Maryland, College Park in Hornbake Library. NPBA serves as a living reminder of the cultural and intellectual continuity of the effort to make television something more than commercial networks can provide. Its mission is to work with the primary national entities of American noncommercial broadcasting to identify records and programs of historical value and to serve as a repository for those materials. Its collection is open to the public.

NPBA was initiated by educator and former PBS board member Donald R McNeil (1923–1996). Citing the language of the Public Broadcasting Act of 1967 that the primary entities of public broadcasting will "establish and maintain a library and archives of non-commercial educational television and radio programs and related materials," McNeil convinced the chief officers of the Corporation for Public Broadcasting, the Public Broadcasting Service, National Public Radio and the Association of America's Public Television Stations to launch a cooperative effort to gather in one place the historical record of American public broadcasting. The University of Maryland Libraries agreed to serve as the academic host for the effort and the Archives was officially inaugurated June 1, 1990.

NPBA maintains the archival record of key public broadcasting agencies such as the Corporation for Public Broadcasting (CPB), National Public Radio (NPR), Public Broadcasting Service (PBS), Children's Television Workshop (CTW) as well as important program materials from stations WAMU 88.5 FM, WETA and Maryland Public Television. The NPBA includes the NPR News Programming Collection. NPBA also maintains the personal papers of over 120 individuals who were associated with public radio or television during the course of their careers.

NPBA continues to grow and develop with the regular transfer of participants' records to its storage areas. The Archives also seeks new collections from other organizations and individuals associated with public broadcasting. To enhance its holdings the Archives welcomes additional correspondence, memoranda, reports, meeting minutes and daily logs or journals; photographs, films, audio/videotapes, kinescopes, graphic materials, scrapbooks, journals and magazines.

== See also ==
- American Archive of Public Broadcasting
