= Tolkien fan fiction =

Works created by Tolkien fans

Tolkien fan fiction is fantasy fiction, often published on the Internet, by Tolkien fans, in large quantities. It is based either directly on J. R. R. Tolkien's books on his fantasy world of Middle-earth, or on an adaptation of this world, especially in Peter Jackson's Lord of the Rings film series or other film depictions of that world. Enormous quantities of writing have resulted, including homoerotic slash fiction and several strands of feminist storytelling.

Many works of fan fiction, including slash, are written by women. They often select as subjects Tolkien's minor female characters, where the limited detail provided allows them to write as they please. An alternative is to invent non-canonical characters, again often women, embodying authors' personal wish-fulfilment. Scholars have discussed the validity of fan fiction, given Tolkien's apparent dislike of the genre, but noting that he had indicated the possibility of "other minds and hands, wielding paint and music and drama." (Note: Carpenter 2023, Letter 131 to Milton Waldman, late 1951) Scholars have begun to accept fan fiction as one of multiple genres within the Middle-earth tradition.

Early fan fiction was published in fanzines, followed by mailing lists and other Internet platforms. The genre accelerated with the arrival of the World Wide Web and specialised websites for fan fiction. These had rules governing what could be written. Much fan fiction is potentially in breach of copyright law, even on non-commercial websites.

== Context ==
J. R. R. Tolkien is best known for writing the fantasy novel The Lord of the Rings. He was a scholar of English literature, a philologist interested in language and poetry from the Middle Ages, especially that of Anglo-Saxon England and Northern Europe. His professional knowledge of poetical works such as Beowulf and Sir Gawain and the Green Knight shaped his fictional world of Middle-earth. His intention to create what has been called "a mythology for England" led him to construct a fully-formed world with its own languages, peoples, cultures, and history.

Tolkien fandom grew rapidly in many countries after the appearance of Peter Jackson's Lord of the Rings film series in 2001–2003.

Fan fiction has precursors in Medieval explorations of Arthurian legend, though modern fan fiction began in the Star Trek fandom in the 1960s. In the 21st century, the Internet afforded fans wishing to publish their own writing, with a wide variety of blogs, discussion groups, lists, live journals, role-playing games and other media formats. A subgenre is fan-written slash fiction, which imagines romantic or homoerotic relationships between Middle-earth characters, such as Sam Gamgee with Frodo Baggins.

== Authors ==
Susan Booker, writing in the 2004 scholarly collection Tolkien on Film, notes that her own experience of interacting with fans bears out the general belief that "the fan fiction universe is composed mainly of the female sex". Some scholars have identified fan fiction as "a genre of resistance against and reparation of media products written by, for, and about heterosexual, cisgender, white, able-bodied males", implying that both authors and readers are women. Dawn Walls-Thumma states that this may cause scholars to discount the genre. Another assumption is that fans choose such feminist or slash genres to criticise or amend Tolkien's perceived worldview, but the goals are not necessarily linked, and women's fan fiction is not always "fully resistant". Karen Viars and Cait Coker write that while Tolkien was not a misogynist, most of the characters in the novel are male, while many Tolkien fans, possibly a majority, are women. Una McCormack comments that, despite plentiful "excellent Tolkien fan fiction" by female authors, a small number of stories by men have gathered much of the attention: in particular, the 1999 The Last Ringbearer by Kirill Yeskov, and the 2010 Mirkwood by Steve Hillard.

But before the three parted on their fearful errand, the White Lord gave in haste to Elladan a jewel like a star. "No time there is to prepare a better light for that fell darkness, and your sword alone will not serve", he said; "Yet this may serve you better than any other light." And so it was; for the light of that jewel, though not great, held a terror for the Orc-folk even greater than the burning pain of the Elven blades... So at last Elladan, after a time he could never reckon... came to Celebrian, slew her tormentors, and bore her still living though wounded with a poisoned dart and evilly tormented by the Orcs, to safety above ground.

— From The Jewel of Arwen by Marion Zimmer Bradley

At least one fan fiction writer, Marion Zimmer Bradley, became a successful novelist. Early in her career, she wrote the 1961 The Jewel of Arwen, filling in how Arwen came to have the jewel that she gave to Frodo, beyond what Tolkien narrates. Also in 1961, she wrote the essay "Of Men, Halflings, and Hero Worship", analysing Éowyn's supposed love for the hero Aragorn, and "the strong love between Frodo and Samwise". This was first published in a fanzine, Astra's Tower, and later reprinted in a scholarly collection. In 1962 she wrote another story, "A Meeting in the Hyades", bringing Aragorn into the world of her 1962 novel The Sword of Aldones.

== Topics ==
Fan attention has, Karen Viars and Cait Coker write, "unsurprisingly focused on many of those topics Tolkien scholars are fond of today—homosexual overtones..., racism..., Tolkien's literary sources and forebears, and the roles of women in his world." Walls-Thumma surveyed Tolkien fan fiction writers' attitudes, finding that 62% agreed that their writing helped them to "correct problems with race, gender, and sexuality that I see in Tolkien's books". Respondents with less than 2 years' experience of writing were the most likely (69.6%) to agree with the statement. Robin Anne Reid suggests that fan fiction like Thorinsmut's Free Orcs alternate universe effectively "writes back to Tolkien's construction of Orcs", offering a non-racist perspective on these beings. Reid comments that the effect is to make the story into one about relationships between Dwarves and Orcs, from the cultural and personal through to politics and trade.

=== Sexuality ===
The dark-haired farmer was slowly undressing too, but my eyes were upon the beautiful son of Fëanáro, his coppery hair spilling off of the rock, his pale skin radiant in Laurelin's light. Long-fingered, graceful hands slipped from his chest to his belly--hollow, with ribs showing in a delicate ladder of shadows--to caress long, shapely thighs that spread open as the farmer stepped free of his trousers, stumbling rather gracelessly in his haste and nearly falling, and came to kneel between Telvo's knees.

— From By the Light of Roses by Dawn Felagund

Anna Smol notes that the "enormous outpouring of fan fiction and fan art" has greatly increased discussion of sexuality in The Lord of the Rings. Tolkien's account of the male intimacy between Frodo and Sam, mirroring his wartime experience of the officer-batman relationship, has, Smol writes, "provoke[d] an active engagement with the story that can lead to a questioning of ideas about adult male and female sexuality, heroic masculinity, and the possibilities for male intimacy." She adds that such engagement can equally be through fan fiction. This may help in promoting tolerance of homosexuality, though she notes that Tolkien fan fiction's heterosexual female authors may be "expressing their own sexual desires through their identification with attractive male characters".

Between July and September 2020, the cartoonist Lee Knox Ostertag published an illustrated fan fiction story about Frodo and Sam, called "In All the Ways There Were".

=== Lives of minor female characters ===
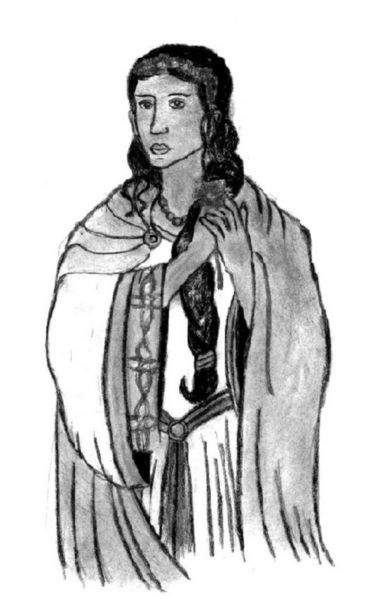
The small amount written about Lothíriel by Tolkien has enabled fans to imagine her as they like. Fan portrait by Gregor Roffalski, 2008

The small amount of detail about several of Tolkien's female characters has left much of the backstory of these women as a blank canvas, allowing fans to reimagine Middle-earth's women as they like. Much attention has been given to Rosie Cotton, Sam's girlfriend. Some fans explore what Amy Sturgis categorises as "Rosie the healer and helpmeet". Others look at what Sturgis names "Rosie the sensual hobbit", adventurous in the bedroom, with the possibility that Sam is at the same time involved sexually with Frodo, and indeed that Rosie too has other lovers, making her relationship with Sam symmetrical. The "Pretty Good Year" series features polyamory with Rosie, Sam, and Frodo. Yet another strand named by Sturgis sees Rosie as a "vampire hobbit" who has supernatural powers, sometimes by wielding the One Ring.

Other storytellers have worked from the small hints provided by Tolkien about women such as Finduilas, Denethor's wife who "died untimely", or Ioreth, the talkative woman in Gondor's House of Healing. Una McCormack notes that Ioreth is a servant, a working-class woman, the kind of person missing from Tolkien's recorded history. When women write about such characters, in her view, they "perform acts of transformation, reparation, and radicalization on The Lord of the Rings, establishing female presences, queer presences, and urban working class presences, in a text chiefly concerned with the masculine and the heroic".

Some fans have developed the Appendices-only Lord of the Rings character Lothíriel, wife of Éomer. (Note: Tolkien 1955, Appendix A, "The House of Eorl", "The Kings of the Mark") (Note: Tolkien 1955, Appendix B, "The Chief Days from the Fall of Barad-dûr to the End of the Third Age") Since Tolkien has said so little about her, she forms, in Viars and Coker's words, "the perfect space for the fan writer to play in Middle-earth", since "she may be beautiful or plain, clever or foolish, obedient or rebellious", according to the writer's taste. They note that fan versions of Lothíriel often render her either as a "contemporary romance novel heroine", or as a "neo-Victorian".

=== Non-canonical characters ===
Estella Brandybuck was brushing her daughter Eowyn's hair.
'Honestly, dear, it seems to me you have more tangles than you have hair, if that is possible.'
'I know. My hair looks like a bush of brambles.'
'Maybe, but it is a very beautiful golden bush.'
Eowyn was not convinced...Of course there were worse things in the world than bad hair. One of them was being almost as tall as one's father. And some things so terrible they could not really be mentioned even in thoughts. Eowyn’s distant cousin, Kitty, bustled into the room.
'My uncle brought the letters. There's one for you, Eowyn.' ...
Kitty and Estella stared at each other. They did not need to say the name on their mind.
Marron Brandybuck.

— From Letters from Bree, part 1: "Tangles", by Arwen Imladviel

The simplest way to compensate for the lack of women is to invent some. McCormack suggests that in this way the fan fiction writer "is arguably reinscribing a history that has somehow been lost in translation or transmission", since, according to fan fiction writer Firerose, the civilisations of Middle-earth could not have survived with the sex ratios that Tolkien documents for the noble families in the Appendices. Firerose's story "Missing" creates Lóriniel, younger sister of Faramir, whose short and tragic life ends during the time described in The Lord of the Rings. Faramir discovers from scraps and small clues that his father Denethor, mad with grief and despair, "has turned to Lóriniel for sexual comfort, eliding wife and daughter."

Sirpa Leppänen writes that some women intentionally compensate for the paucity of women in Tolkien. She gives as example the story Letters from Bree by Arwen Imladviel, in which Estella Brandybuck brushes her adopted daughter Eowyn "of Brandy Hall"'s hair: she isn't surnamed Brandybuck as she was born out of wedlock. Leppänen comments that the female author skilfully imitates Tolkien's prose style, but creates a "much more diffuse" narrative with female characters who lead domestic lives and conduct "personal and intimate discussions with each other", in marked contrast to Tolkien's epic narrative and "heroic adventures".

The creation of new, "original" or non-canonical characters, McCormack writes, brings dangers; one is that fan fiction groups especially despise so-called "Mary Sue" characters. These represent wished-for personalities of their authors, and are accordingly unnaturally perfect and idealised. Yet another genre is "Middle-earth tourism", escapist fantasy in which someone is transported from normal life into an adventure in the imagined world.

== Validity ==
=== Basis in Tolkien's writings ===
"I would ... leave scope for other minds and hands"
Tolkien's attitude to adaptations	Media
Approved of	Painting ✓ Music ✓ Drama ✓
Actively disliked	Film ✗
Disliked an instance; Not in 'approved' list	Fiction ?

In 1966, Tolkien wrote to his publishers complaining that a male fan had sent him an "impertinent contribution to my troubles", a draft of a sequel to The Lord of the Rings. (Note: Carpenter 2023, Letter 292 to Joy Hill at Allen & Unwin, 12 December 1966) He described the fan as "this young ass" and the sequel as "tripe". He went on: "I once had a similar proposal, couched in the most obsequious terms, from a young woman, and when I replied in the negative, I received a most vituperative letter."

In a letter to another publisher, Milton Waldman of Collins, some years earlier, Tolkien wrote of his intended mythology for England that

I would draw some of the great tales in fullness, and leave many only placed in the scheme, and sketched. The cycles should be linked to a majestic whole, and yet leave scope for other minds and hands, wielding paint and music and drama. Absurd!

Megan Abrahamson, writing in Mythlore, comments that this opens the way to fans to create a works filling gaps in the Tolkien canon, but that the next word in the letter is "Absurd!" She notes that the thing Tolkien was calling absurd was his own wish to create a mythology, but that the word "also makes suspect fans' use of his quote as a kind of letter of marque to write music and fanfiction". Renée Vink notes both Tolkien's "young ass" remark, and the ambiguity of his "Absurd!", adding that fiction was not among the media he listed in his scoping of extensions by other hands, and that he disliked film adaptations of his works, as recorded in his letters.

Abrahamson argues that, while Tolkien may have seemed hostile to fan fiction, at least if it was not good, Tolkien's own views about leaving freedom for the reader, rather than having the author dominate using allegory, leave open the possibility that readers might choose to write. She comments that Tolkien himself can be seen as a fan author, both for the way he constantly developed elements of the Silmarillion, and for his reworking of medieval tales such as in his The Fall of Arthur. Further, she writes, his discussion in "On Fairy-Stories" about the way a storyteller uses many sources like "the bones of the ox out of which [the soup] had been boiled", admits that each author's story is only partly original, and that other authors cannot be blamed "for using nearly the same bones as he has [done] to make their soups".

=== Scholarly acceptance ===
A diagram of Renée Vink's analysis of the difference between derivative literature and fan fiction

Renée Vink argued that Tolkien fan fiction is a form of literary criticism. She stated that "the only reason" why other literary prequels, sequels, and portraits of characters are not called fan fiction is that the works on which they are based are out of copyright. Vink gave as examples Homer's Odyssey, Ovid's Metamorphoses, Jane Eyre (as in Jean Rhys's Wide Sargasso Sea), and Tolkien's own The Legend of Sigurd and Gudrún from Norse myth. She argued that quality cannot be the criterion, and called fan stories "the ultimate form of readers' response", as in reader-response criticism.

Vink added that authors lose full control of a work once it is published, as readers can freely interpret what is written. In Tolkien's case, she stated, his fictional pretence of translating and of editing manuscripts invites critical scrutiny and analysis; she noted that fan writers add "fore- or afterwords, footnotes or even essays complementing their stories". One of her examples of such "interpretative fanfic" is the story "Like the Heathen Kings of Old". This, she wrote, suggests that Denethor's attempt to burn his son Faramir alongside himself is a human sacrifice, and that the heathen kings were the "renegade Númenoreans who made human sacrifices in the temple of Melkor in Armenelos with Sauron as a high priest – the same Sauron under whose shadow Denethor had fallen", in her view a non-obvious but logical conclusion.

In 2019, Dieter Petzold described fan fiction as one of several types of "sub-sub-creations", alluding to Tolkien's theory that authors are able to create fiction under God's ability to create the world, by God's gift. He sets it alongside parodies such as the 1969 Bored of the Rings, pastiches such as Terry Brooks's 1977 The Sword of Shannara, and indeed and the modern fantasy genre, which is influenced by Tolkien.

== Publication ==
=== History ===
With no exceptions:
1. All fan fiction here is based on the characters and situations described in the selected fandoms ...
2. As this is a het archive, obviously no slash is permitted ...
...
8. If your story contains elements that some readers might find offensive, WARNINGS are necessary ...
9. There will be NO

- Real People Fanfics (RPFs, RPSs) - Actors from movies or TV series ... have no place on this archive.
- Adult sex with a minor ...

— The Open Scrolls Archive's Submission Guidelines, 2014

The first Tolkien fan pieces were published in fanzines: a poem in 1959 and a piece of fiction in 1960. Until the early 1990s, publication was in copied sheets or fanzines distributed by mail or at meetings. With the availability of Internet media such as Usenet newsgroups, mailing lists, and personal websites from 1992 onwards, fan fiction was increasingly shared online. From 2000, fans posted poems, stories and humorous pieces to the FanFiction.net website. Growth was greatly accelerated by the appearance in 2001–2003 of Peter Jackson's Lord of the Rings films.

Soon after Jackson's films came out, mailing lists started to be replaced by specialised archives. For example, the Silmarillion Writers' Guild provides an archive of fan fiction based on The Silmarillion; it was founded by Dawn Walls-Thumma (known as Dawn Felagund). The Many Paths to Tread archive is open to Tolkien fan fiction more generally; it was founded in 2009 and run by moderators.

Walls-Thumma writes that the "insularity, the sometimes high degree of specialization, the almost xenophobia" of the mailing lists towards people who saw things differently "were kept in place by the archives." In addition, some archives imposed rules to exclude "the most egregious" genres.

Walls-Thumma's 2015 analysis of rules imposed by fan fiction archives
Archive	Boundaries	Approach
Open Scrolls Archive	Modern characters, film actors, Mary Sue stories, slash fiction all excluded	Bold, unsubtle, effective
Stories of Arda	Modern characters, film actors, Mary Sue stories, slash fiction all excluded	Bold, unsubtle, effective
Henneth-Annûn Story Archive	"academic, professional, masculine, objective" style	"More subtle", effective

Walls-Thumma suggests that these barriers, and the resulting fragmentation of fans into groups that functioned as communities, has helped to create fan fiction writers "who are not only well read but also insightful and critical of Tolkien's texts." Web access has enabled extensive public dialogue between fan fiction creators and other fans. Yijia Li classified community responses into four types: praise; challenge and multi-person discussion of interpretation; discussion of romantic relationships; and references to Tolkien's original text as authority. Li commented that those involved were probably already keen Tolkien fans, and had nearly always read Tolkien's Middle-earth books.

=== Copyright ===
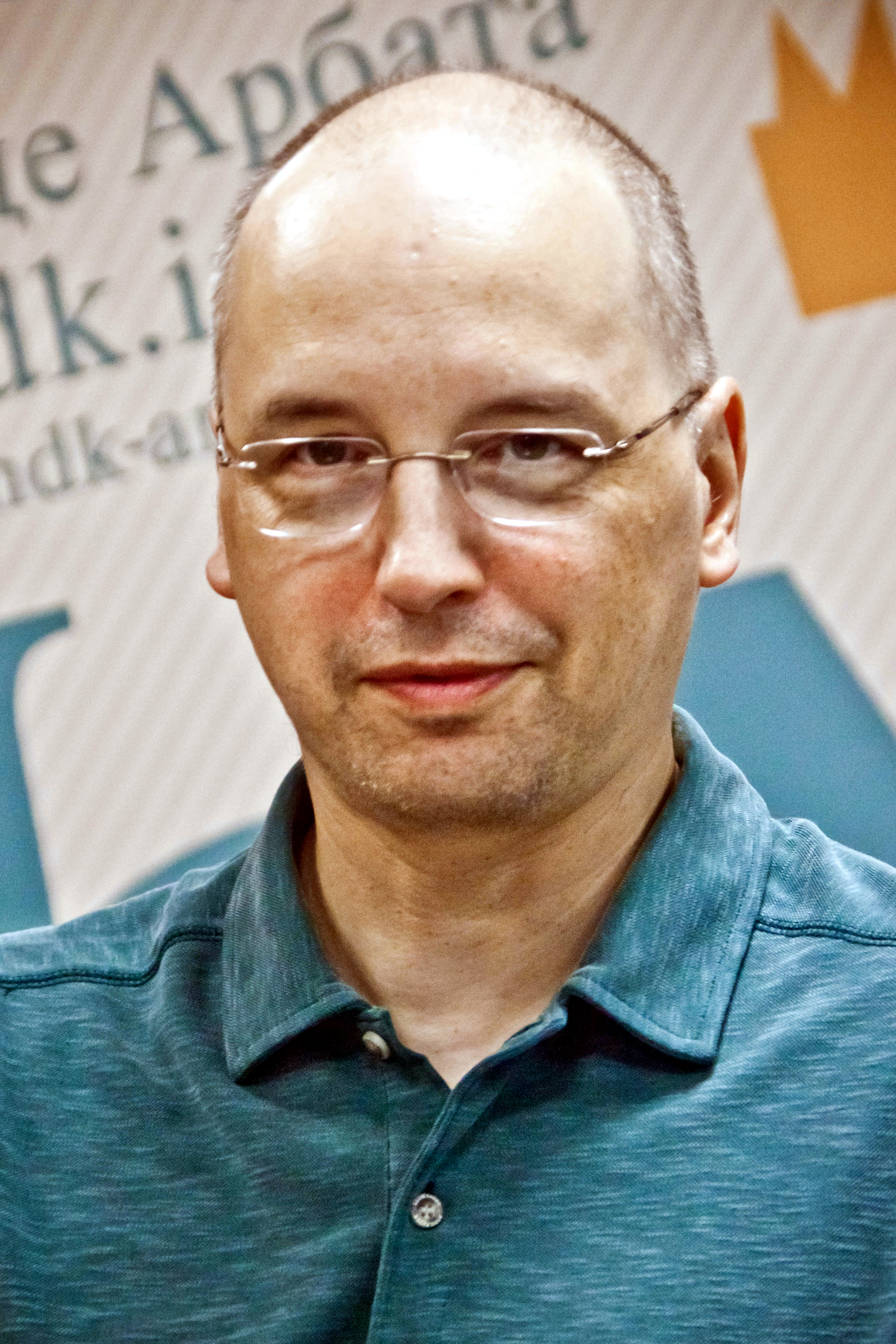
The relaxed Russian attitude to copyright has enabled fan fiction writer Nick Perumov to publish Middle-earth books including Ring of Darkness to critical acclaim.

A different boundary is copyright, with enormous numbers of published stories from fan authors who have become able to communicate with a large audience. Smol describes fan writing in the Western world as "on the fringes of copyright law", noting that Tolkien fan authors know they cannot sell their work, but publish using pseudonyms and copyright disclaimers. Booker describes fan fiction on the Web as an "outlaw practice", since "most fan fiction sites do actually violate strict copyright interpretations, despite posted disclaimers."

Fan fiction has a special status in Russia. Soviet-era attitudes allowing translation and rewriting empowered Russians like Nick Perumov to produce Tolkien fan fiction like his 1991 Ring of Darkness, and a publisher to print it, effectively ignoring Western copyright law. Kirill Yeskov's The Last Ringbearer has similarly been successful in Russia. It has been translated into several European languages, but has not been released commercially in English, for fear of legal action by the Tolkien Estate.

== See also ==
- Jane Austen fan fiction
- My Little Pony: Friendship Is Magic fan fiction
