= Sexuality in The Lord of the Rings =

Representation of sexuality in J. R. R. Tolkien's The Lord of the Rings

The presence of sexuality in The Lord of the Rings, a bestselling fantasy novel by J. R. R. Tolkien, has been debated, as it is somewhat unobtrusive. However, love and marriage appear in the form of the warm relationship between the hobbits Sam Gamgee and Rosie Cotton; the unreturned feelings of Éowyn for Aragorn, followed by her falling in love with Faramir, and marrying him; and Aragorn's love for Arwen, described in an appendix rather than in the main text, as "The Tale of Aragorn and Arwen". Multiple scholars have noted the symbolism of the monstrous female spider Shelob. Interest has been concentrated, too, on the officer-batman-inspired same-sex relationship of Frodo and his gardener Sam as they travel together on the dangerous quest to destroy the Ring. Scholars and fans have interpreted the relationship in different ways, from close but not necessarily homosexual to plainly homoerotic, or as an idealised heroic friendship.

== Context ==
=== Tolkien's background ===
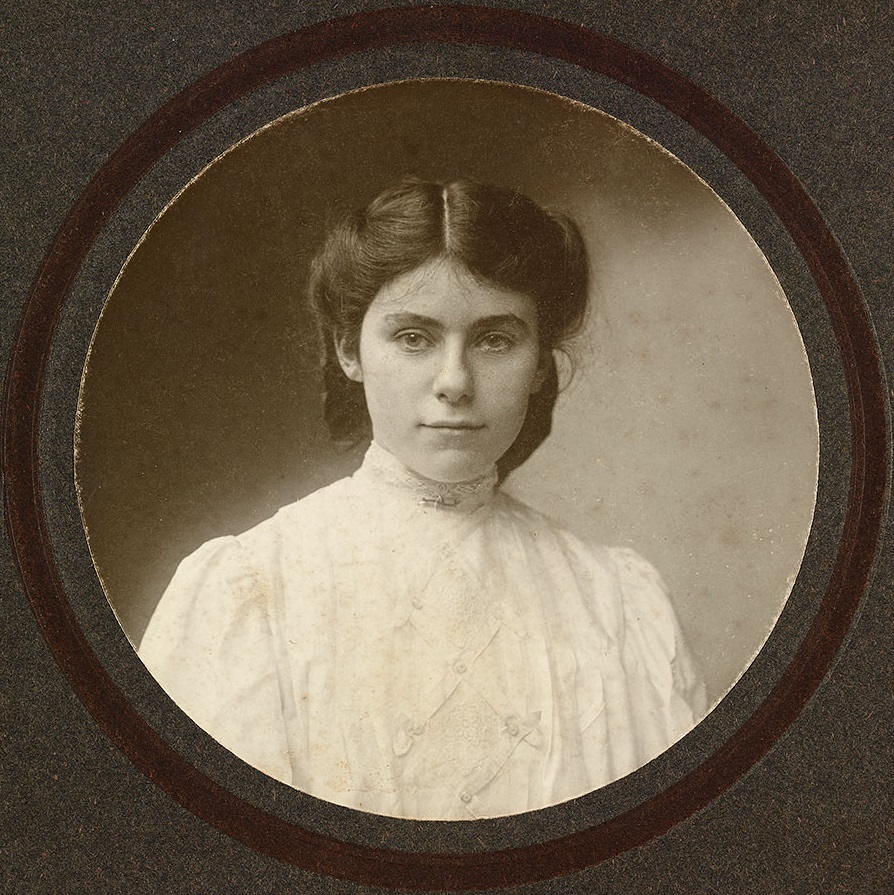
Tolkien fell in love with Edith Bratt when he was 16. They were happily married for over 50 years.

The author of the bestselling fantasy novel The Lord of the Rings, J. R. R. Tolkien, was orphaned as a boy, his father dying in South Africa and his mother in England a few years later. He was brought up by his guardian, a Catholic priest, Father Francis Xavier Morgan, and educated at male-only grammar schools and then Exeter College, Oxford, which at that time had only male students. He joined the British Army's Lancashire Fusiliers and saw the horror of trench warfare, with life as an officer made more bearable by the support of a male batman or servant. After the war he became a professor of English Language at the University of Leeds, and then at the University of Oxford, where he taught at Pembroke College. At Oxford, he created an all-male literary group with another Oxford professor of English, C. S. Lewis, called the Inklings.

Tolkien held traditional views about women, stating that men were active in their professions while women were inclined to domestic life. (Note: Carpenter 2023, #43 to Michael Tolkien, 6–8 March 1941) While defending the role of women in The Lord of the Rings, the scholar of children's literature Melissa Hatcher wrote that "Tolkien himself, in reality, probably was the stodgy sexist Oxford professor that feminist scholars paint him out to be".

Tolkien met another orphan, Edith Mary Bratt, when he was 16, and in the summer of 1909 they fell in love. Morgan prohibited them from meeting until Tolkien was 21; when Tolkien reached that age in 1913 he proposed to her, and they became engaged. They were married in 1916, linked by strong affection throughout their marriage. In 1917, on leave from the army, they went out together, visiting a wood near Roos in Yorkshire. There, Edith danced for him among the "hemlocks", (Note: Garth writes that "The flowers, Anthriscus sylvestris, are what books might call cow parsley ... among many other names; but Tolkien referred to all such white-flowered umbellifers (and not just the highly poisonous Conium maculatum) by the usual rural name of hemlock." In a footnote, Garth adds that Christopher Tolkien records that his father objected to the habit of limiting vernacular names to "this or that species" as the "pedantry of popularizing botanists".) as later in his fiction Lúthien danced for Beren, a story that formed the centrepiece of The Silmarillion. They had four children, to whom they were both devoted. Edith died in 1971, Tolkien two years later.

=== Lack of sexuality in The Lord of the Rings ===
Commentators have remarked on the apparent lack of sexuality in The Lord of the Rings. The scholar of culture Douglas Kellner writes that there is "no overt sexuality" in the text. The feminist and queer theory scholar Valerie Rohy notes the female novelist A. S. Byatt's remark that "part of the reason I read Tolkien when I'm ill is that there is an almost total absence of sexuality in his world, which is restful"; the Tolkien scholar Tom Shippey wrote that "there is not enough awareness of sexuality" in the work; and the novelist and critic Adam Mars-Jones stated that "above all, sexuality [is] what is absent from the [work's] vision". Rohy comments that it is easy to see why they might say this; in the epic tradition, Tolkien "abandons courtship when battle looms, apparently sublimating sexuality to the greater quest". She accepts that there are three romances leading to weddings in the tale, those of Aragorn and Arwen, Éowyn and Faramir, and Sam and Rosie, but points out that their love stories are mainly external to the main narrative about the Ring, and that their beginnings are basically not shown: they simply appear as marriages.

=== Discussions of the novel's depiction of sexuality ===
The feminist scholar Catherine R. Stimpson charged that "Tolkien is irritatingly, blandly, traditionally masculine....He makes his women characters, no matter what their rank, the most hackneyed of stereotypes. They are either beautiful and distant, simply distant, or simply simple". The scholar Patrick Curry commented that "it is tempting to reply, guilty as charged", agreeing that Tolkien is "paternalistic", though he objects that Galadriel and Éowyn have more to them than Stimpson alleges. Karen Viars and Cait Coker write that while Tolkien was not a misogynist, most of the characters in the novel are male, while many Tolkien fans, possibly a majority, are women. The scholar of English Anna Smol writes that the "enormous outpouring of Tolkien fan fiction and fan art" has led to widespread discussion of sexuality in the novel. Daniel Timmons writes in Mythlore that although there are "no overt or implied sex scenes", there is more to sexuality than intercourse, and for example among the hobbit protagonists, there is definitely "sensuality", which he defines as "physical attraction linked with psychological bonding". Timmons adds that the "lament" of Stimpson's title, "No Sex Please—We're Hobbits", may be witty, but is "flawed", as the novel works well in its chosen genre. The scholar and fantasy author Dallas John Baker comments that scholars and critics have debated gender and sexuality in The Lord of the Rings from soon after the novel's publication. He writes that he felt the need to "writ[e] back" to Tolkien with his own young adult fiction to show "a fantasy world in which women and girls were central".

== Love and marriage ==
Heterosexual love and marriage are depicted in The Lord of the Rings, but unobtrusively, to the extent that some critics have stated that there are no women in the book. The main heterosexual relationships are those involving Sam Gamgee, Éowyn of Rohan, and Aragorn.

=== Rustic love ===
The hobbit character Sam Gamgee leaves his girlfriend Rosie Cotton when he sets off from the Shire, and returns to her admiration for the Battle of Bywater. (Note: Tolkien 1955, book 6, ch. 8, "The Scouring of the Shire") They have a "happy ending" with marriage and 13 children, flourishing in a simple life with Sam as mayor of the Shire, its fertility restored after Saruman's depredations by his judicious distribution of Galadriel's gift of magical earth from her Elvish garden. (Note: Tolkien 1955, book 6, ch. 9, "The Grey Havens") Tolkien stated that "the simple 'rustic' love of Sam and his Rosie (nowhere elaborated) is absolutely essential [his italics] to the study of his (the chief hero's) character, and to the theme of the relation of ordinary life (breathing, eating, working, begetting) and quests, sacrifice, causes, and the 'longing for Elves', and sheer beauty." (Note: Carpenter 2023, #131 to Milton Waldman, 1951)

The scholar of fantasy Amy Sturgis describes in Mythlore how after Peter Jackson's Lord of the Rings film trilogy, Rosie has been reimagined by female fans in response to Tolkien's "incomplete literary portrait". Rosie becomes in their fan fiction variously "the paragon of the hearth, the iconoclast of the bedroom, or the agent of the supernatural".

=== Shieldmaiden ===
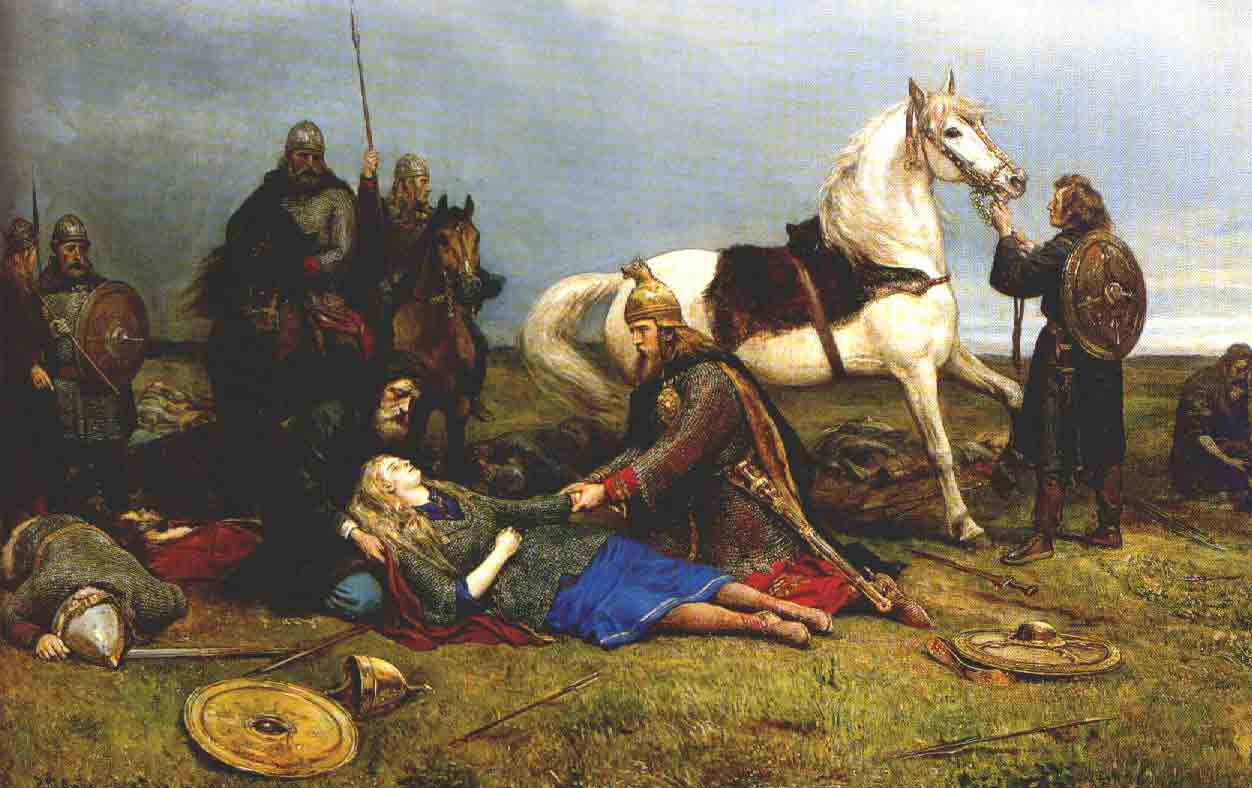
Éowyn's appearance in the Battle of the Pelennor Fields has been compared to the death scene of the shieldmaiden Hervor, as depicted in Hervor's Death by Peter Nicolai Arbo.

Éowyn's romantic feelings appear first with her unreturned attachment to Aragorn. (Note: Tolkien 1954, book 3, ch. 6 "The King of the Golden Hall") (Note: Tolkien 1955, book 5, ch. 2 "The Passing of the Grey Company") Feeling rejected, she says she is a shieldmaiden, and against orders, chooses to go and fight in the Battle of the Pelennor Fields. There, she and the Hobbit Merry Brandybuck kill the Lord of the Nazgul; she is seriously wounded. (Note: Tolkien 1955, book 5, ch. 6 "The Battle of the Pelennor Fields") Recuperating in the Houses of Healing in Minas Tirith, she falls in love with Faramir, who had also been wounded. She renounces her warlike ways to become a healer, and they are engaged. (Note: Tolkien 1955, book 6, ch. 5 "The Steward and the King") At the end of the book, they marry. (Note: Tolkien 1955, book 6, ch. 6 "Many Partings")

The scholar of feminism Penny Griffin writes that in the Peter Jackson film Return of the King, Éowyn's credentials as a suitably feminist "Strong Female Character" are spoiled when her story ends with her disavowing battle and marrying Faramir to live, "we assume, happily ever after". Shippey writes that the Hollywood studio sent a "script doctor" to New Zealand to bring Jackson's direction into line with their view, which was that since Aragorn needed a single love-interest, Arwen could be deleted, and "Aragorn should then marry Éowyn instead of politely dissuading her. ... The script doctor's advice was ignored." Jackson does however make Aragorn far more romantic than do either Tolkien or Bakshi, who had directed an earlier film of The Lord of the Rings. Jackson devotes substantial viewing time to Aragorn's modern love triangle, and provides "clear on-screen chemistry" with Éowyn.

=== Man and Elf-maiden ===
Aragorn's love for Arwen is narrated in an appendix rather than in the main text, as "The Tale of Aragorn and Arwen". In the tale, Aragorn sings the Lay of Lúthien, an immortal Elf-maiden in the First Age who marries a man, Beren, thereby choosing a mortal life. As he does so, he sees Arwen, who looks to him like Lúthien. She reveals that although she seems no older than he, she is of great age. He falls in love with her. Arwen's father, Elrond, sees what has happened, and tells Aragorn that he may not marry until he is found worthy. They meet again in Lothlórien, nearly thirty years later. Galadriel dresses Aragorn like an elf-lord. Arwen sees him and makes her choice; they become engaged. Elrond tells Aragorn that they may marry only when he is King of both Gondor and Arnor. Some years later, Aragorn helps to bring about victory in the War of the Ring (the action of the main text of The Lord of the Rings), and becomes King of Gondor and Arnor. At midsummer, he and Arwen are married in Minas Tirith. Elrond leaves Middle-earth for Elvenhome, never to return. Aragorn, heroic but mortal, lies down to die 120 years later; Arwen sorrowfully goes to a now-barren Lothlórien to die, alone of all her kin, never to rejoin them "beyond the end of the world". (Note: Tolkien 1955, Appendix A: "The Tale of Aragorn and Arwen")

Tolkien described the tale as "the highest love-story" of the book. (Note: Carpenter 2023, #131 to Milton Waldman of Collins, late 1951) Its relegation to an appendix makes it inconspicuous, and deprives the main text of much of its love interest. Jackson chose to incorporate the tale in his film trilogy to remedy this, giving Arwen more of a speaking part and creating additional scenes for her. The feminist scholar Melissa Hatcher, writing in Mythlore, calls Tolkien's Arwen "a symbol of the unattainable, a perfect match for the unattainable Aragorn in Éowyn's eyes."

== Female monster ==
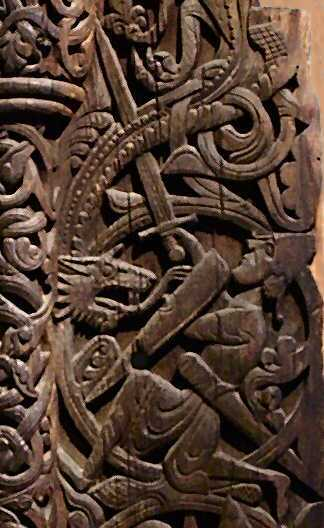
The Hobbits' fight with Shelob derives from multiple myths. Panel in Hylestad Stave Church showing Sigurd's sword penetrating Fafnir.

=== Narrative ===
Shelob, a giant and evil spider, is presented as a disgusting female monster. Forewarned by Gollum, she attempts to trap Frodo and Sam as they cross the mountains into Mordor; they have no choice but to go past the tunnels to her lair, and to fight their way through. They manage to pass one obstacle, a tunnel blocked by giant cobwebs, but she ambushes and stings Frodo, who collapses. Sam fights on, taking the Ring and Frodo's sword, Sting; Shelob attacks him, but he repels her with the light of the Phial of Galadriel. She tries to crush him to death; he allows her to sink down on to him, holding Sting point uppermost, and her downward "thrust" causes the sword to "prick" deep into her enormous belly. She is seriously wounded and retires into her lair, making bubbling noises and dripping blood. (Note: Tolkien 1954, book 4, chapter 9: "Shelob's Lair.") (Note: Tolkien 1954, book 4, chapter 8: "The Stairs of Cirith Ungol")

=== Perversion of female sexuality ===
The Tolkien scholar David Craig writes that Shelob is sometimes just called "she", drawing the reader's attention to her gender. Her "hate and depravity" are "strongly sexualised"; Tolkien wrote that "Far and wide her lesser broods, bastards of the miserable mates, her own offspring, that she slew, spread from glen to glen". Craig comments that "her crimes are abominable and include incest, illegitimacy and infanticide, all crimes pertaining to sex".

=== Vagina dentata ===
The Anglican priest and scholar of literature Alison Milbank writes that Shelob is undeniably sexual: "Tolkien offers a most convincing Freudian vagina dentata (toothed vagina) in the ancient and disgustingly gustatory spider Shelob." Milbank states that Shelob symbolises "an ancient maternal power that swallows up masculine identity and autonomy", threatening a "castrating hold [which] is precisely what the sexual fetishist fears, and seeks to control". The Tolkien scholar and medievalist Jane Chance mentions "Sam's penetration of her belly with his sword", noting that this may be an appropriate and symbolic way of ending her production of "bastards".

The scholar of children's literature Zoë Jaques writes that Shelob is the "embodiment of monstrous maternity"; Sam's battle with Shelob could be interpreted as a "masculine rite of passage" where a smaller, weaker male penetrates and escapes the vast female body and her malicious intent. The feminist scholar Brenda Partridge described the hobbits' protracted struggle with Shelob as rife with sexual symbolism. She writes that Tolkien derived Shelob from multiple myths: Sigurd killing Fafnir the dragon; Theseus killing the Minotaur; Arachne and the spider; and Milton's Sin in Paradise Lost. The result is to depict the woman as a threat, with implicit overtones of sexuality.

Brenda Partridge's analysis of Shelob's sexual imagery
| Tolkien's image | Implications |
|---|---|
| Sauron's cat | woman as "graceful, sensual, and aloof" |
| Spawning broods of monsters | fertility |
| Underground lair | womb |
| Tunnels to lair | "female sexual orifice" |
| Cobwebs at entrance brushing against Frodo, Sam | pubic hair |
| Frodo cuts cobwebs ... "a great rent was made ... swayed like a loose veil" | tearing of the hymen |
| "Soft squelching body" | sexually aroused female genitals |
| Folds of skin | labia |
| Swords | phalluses |
| Sam "held the elven blade point upwards, fending off that ghastly roof; and so Shelob ... thrust herself upon a bitter spike. Deep, deep it pricked" | erection, penetration |

Partridge's interpretation has been called Freudian fantasy by the Catholic author and Tolkien scholar Joseph Pearce.

== Same-sex relationships ==
The same-sex relationships in The Lord of the Rings have been discussed by critics, who have reached a variety of conclusions.

=== Intensely private male friendship ===
The scholar of humanities Hannah Mendro notes of the friendship of Legolas and Gimli that "one of the last notes in the Red Book" describes it as "greater than any that has been between Elf and Dwarf. If this is true, then it is strange indeed: that a Dwarf should be willing to leave Middle-earth for any love, or that the Eldar should receive him, or that the Lords of the West should permit it. But it is said that Gimli went also out of desire to see again the beauty of Galadriel; and it may be that she, being mighty among the Eldar, obtained this grace for him. More cannot be said of this matter". Mendro comments that the friendship is "both strange and comforting, intensely intimate and oddly private, deeply committed and yet riddled with gaps. All of this makes them perfect candidates for a queer reading". Mendro observes that the friendship comes into being largely out of sight, as Legolas and Gimli often walk together in the forest of Lothlórien, to the surprise of the rest of the Company. The relationship is evidently close, and kept private. Mendro comments that the pair are in a way "the least significant members" of the Company, without the leadership role of Gandalf, the kingly destiny of Aragorn, or the Sauron-defeating roles of the Hobbits. They are, she writes, present at one event after another, but responding mainly to each other. This creates "both the queer potential and the queer deniability" of their relationship.

=== Officer-batman relationship ===
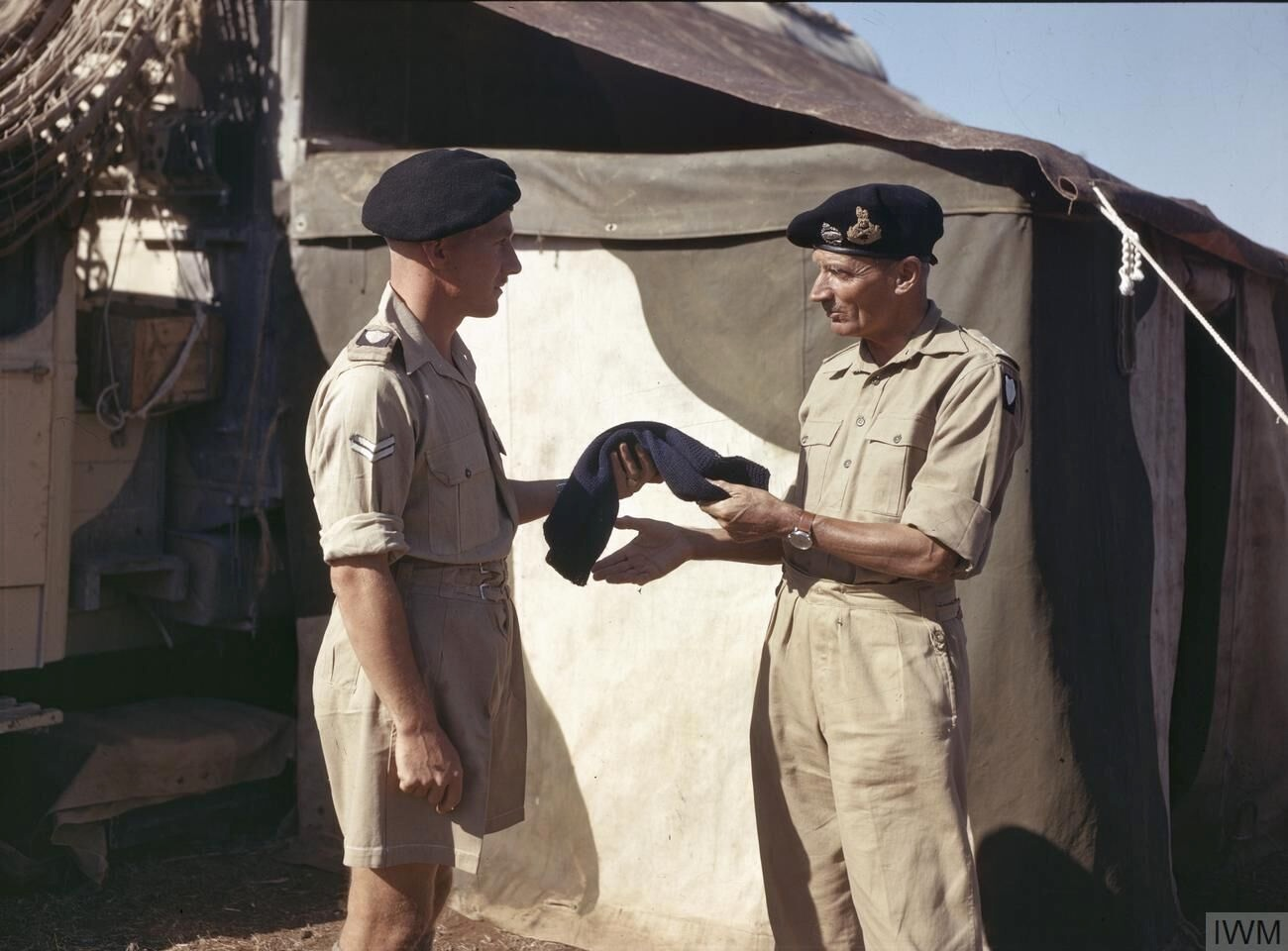
A British officer, General Bernard Montgomery, being given a scarf by his batman

The clearest same-sex relationship in the novel, in the eyes of scholars, is that of the ringbearer Frodo Baggins and his servant, originally his gardener, Sam. Tolkien described their relationship as like that of an officer in the British Army and his military servant or batman. (Note: Carpenter 2023, #246 to Eileen Elgar, September 1963) He had been impressed with the personal qualities of the batmen that he encountered on the Western Front in the First World War. The text depicts the relationship as one of mutual friendship and loyalty. As Frodo is progressively weakened by the burden of carrying the Ring, Sam becomes increasingly resourceful, and increasingly tender in his care and concern for Frodo. At one point, Sam takes Frodo's hand, though he is embarrassed to do this.

=== Male intimacy ===
The scholar of English literature Christopher Vaccaro, in The J. R. R. Tolkien Encyclopedia, writes that Frodo and Sam's relationship "fits neatly into the discourse of friendship expressed by homosexual men until the mid-twentieth century." He notes that the feminist scholar Brenda Partridge and the scholar of English Anna Smol discuss a continuum of "nongenital tactile intimacy between men" which in his view "makes permeable the culturally determined boundaries coding some friendships as heterosexual and others as homosexual". Smol looks at the substantial body of homoerotic fan fiction written, mainly by heterosexual women, in response to The Lord of the Rings. She comments that "For a book that is supposed to be devoid of adult sexuality, The Lord of the Rings has always elicited strong reactions focusing on sex. The male intimacy that Tolkien describes, particularly the relationship between Frodo and Sam, often has an unsettling effect on readers whose reactions may range from dissatisfaction to erotic excitement", adding that neither reaction is often informed by knowledge of the friendly British First World War officer-batman relationship. Critics such as Partridge, Esther Saxey and Marion Zimmer Bradley have stated that the relationship of Frodo and Sam is friendly and intimate, but not necessarily homosexual. The scholar of culture Daniel Allington examines critical analysis of fan slash fiction about Frodo and Sam's relationship, writing that fans' discussions of such fiction must not be assumed to be simple reports of beliefs, when they are "complex rhetorical manoeuvres" within that culture.

=== Idealised heroic friendship ===
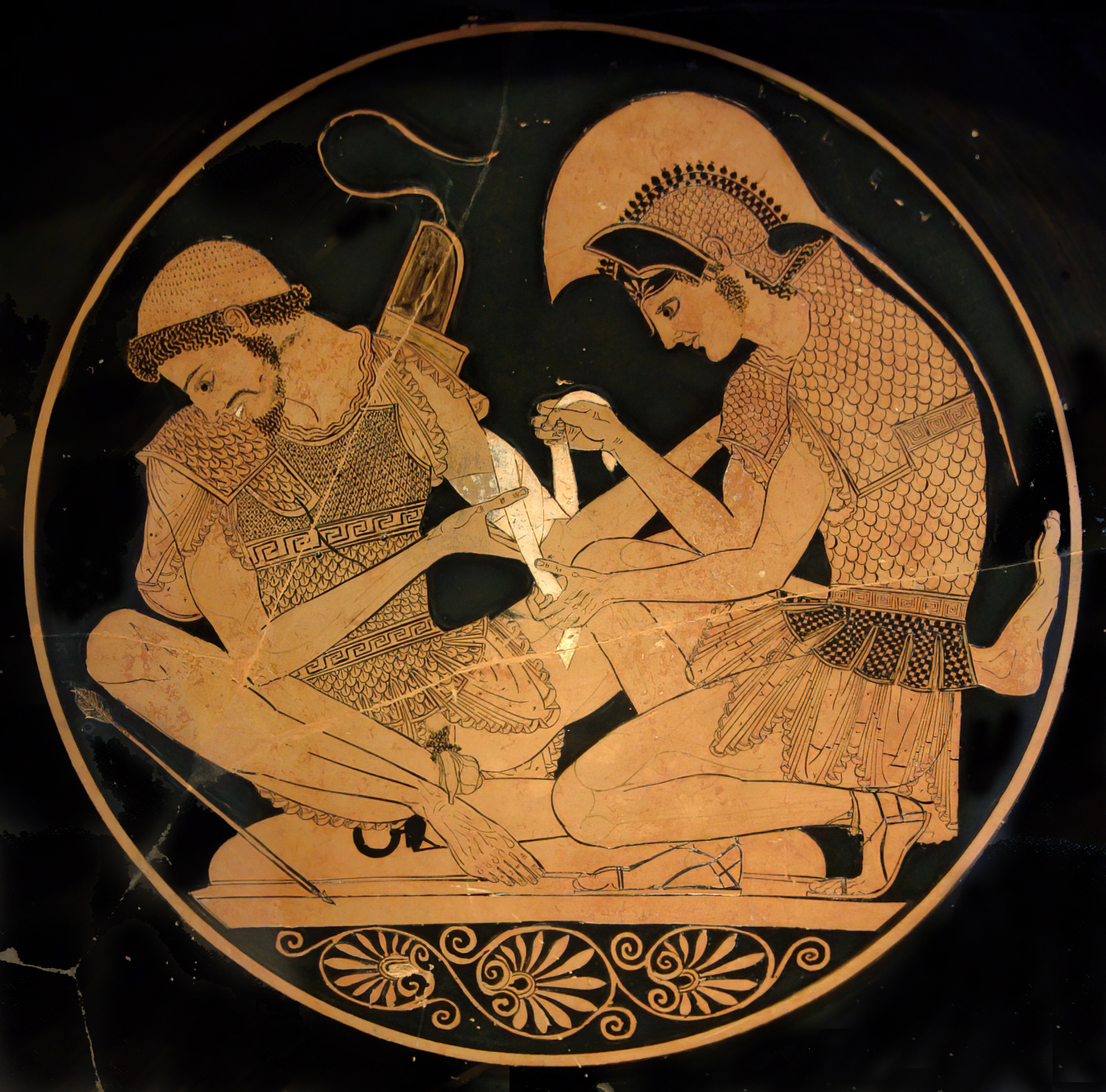
The heroic friendship of Frodo and Sam has been likened to that of Achilles and Patroclus, shown here on a red-figure calyx from Vulci, c. 500 BC.

The fantasy and science fiction author Marion Zimmer Bradley wrote that Frodo and Sam have the most intense love described in the book, stating that towards the end they attain "classical 'idealized friendship'" of an emotional force like that of Achilles and Patroclus in the Iliad, or David and Jonathan in the Old Testament, "passing the love of women". Bradley writes, too, that the monstrous Gollum is bound up with Frodo and Sam in a love-hate triangle, commenting that when relationships are very strong, "hatred and love are very much akin", especially in weak people. As Frodo weakens and he and Sam grow closer, Sam "reaches an almost religious devotion and tenderness toward easing Frodo's path". Bradley calls the steady growth in intensity and diminishing distance between Frodo and Sam "surely one of the most compelling analyses of heroic friendship".

=== Homoerotic ===
The scholar of English David LaFontaine, in The Gay and Lesbian Review, writes that The Lord of the Rings achieved cult status and large sales, but was mainly excluded from literary study, partly because fantasy was despised as a genre, but partly also because of the "powerful undercurrent of same-sex love within the realm of Middle-earth". He notes that Jackson chose to make use of the gay themes in the work for his 2001–2003 Lord of the Rings film trilogy: "homoerotic desire is up there on Jackson's very large screen for all to see". In his view, Sam has an "epiphany" while he watches Frodo sleeping and says "I love him. He's like that, and sometimes [his inner light] shines through, somehow. But I love him, whether or no." (Note: Tolkien 1954, book 4, chapter 4: "Of Herbs and Stewed Rabbit") This is followed, writes LaFontaine, by "scenes in which the two hobbits express their love in increasingly homoerotic terms: holding hands, sleeping huddled together, swearing eternal devotion." The scholar of literature Robin Anne Reid describes the "queer" (as opposed to purely male homosexual) Tolkien fan fiction tradition that has developed in response.

=== Tension and ambivalence ===
The scholar Olivia-Kate Burgham notes the growing intimacy between Frodo and Sam as they reach Mordor. She comments that the relationship between the two hobbits starts to cross the heteronormative boundary at the geographical boundary. The resulting tension, she writes, reflects Tolkien's ambivalence about the sexuality, which is mirrored by the sterility of the land of Mordor.
