= Ioreth =

Ioreth may refer to:

- a wise-woman of Gondor in The Return of the King by J. R. R. Tolkien.
- a supporting non player character in the 2014 video game Middle-earth: Shadow of Mordor
