= Rose Cotton =

Rose Cotton is the name of:

- Rose Cotton (EastEnders), fictional character from EastEnders
- Rosie Cotton, the girlfriend, later the wife, of Samwise Gamgee in The Lord of the Rings
