= Éomer =

Fictional character in J. R. R. Tolkien's Middle-earth

- Middle-earth character

In-universe information
- Aliases: Third Marshal of the Riddermark, the King of Rohan
- Race: Men of Rohan
- Book(s): The Two Towers (1954); The Return of the King (1955)

Éomer is a fictional character in J. R. R. Tolkien's Middle-earth. He appears in The Lord of the Rings as a leader of the Riders of Rohan who serve as cavalry to the army of Rohan, fighting against Mordor.

The name Éomer, meaning "Horse-famous" in Old English, is from Beowulf, a work that Tolkien had studied extensively. Despite the evident Old English connection, Tolkien denied that Éomer and the Riders of Rohan directly represented the Anglo-Saxons. Scholars have noted that while written imagery remains ambiguous and can combine suggestions of Gothic and Anglo-Saxon origins, film such as Peter Jackson's Lord of the Rings trilogy inevitably have to choose.

== Fictional account ==
=== Main text ===
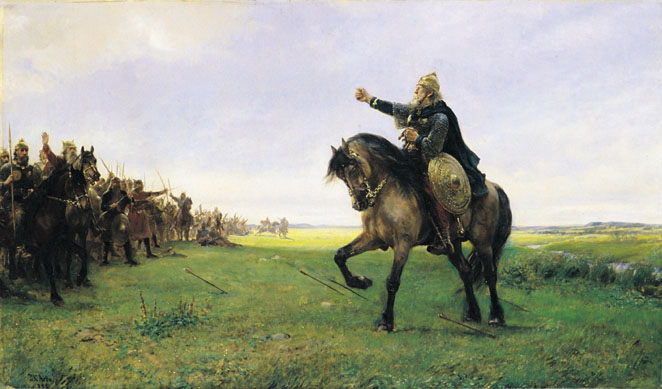
Aspects of Éomer such as fighting on horseback and his flaxen hair suggest a Gothic influence. Painting Gizur and the Huns by Peter Nicolai Arbo, 1886

Éomer is the son of Théodwyn and Éomund. After their parents' death Éomer and his sister Éowyn were adopted by their uncle Théoden, king of the Rohirrim. He is the leader of the forces of Rohan who attack and kill the Uruk-hai who had kidnapped the hobbits Merry Brandybuck and Pippin Took. Against orders, impressed by Aragorn, he helps Aragorn, Gimli and Legolas by lending them horses and guiding them to where the attack had taken place. (Note: The Two Towers, book 3, ch. 2 "The Riders of Rohan")

On his return to Edoras, Éomer reports this meeting to Théoden, and is imprisoned on the orders of Gríma Wormtongue, Théoden's sinister advisor. Aragorn, Gimli and Legolas arrive in Edoras with the wizard Gandalf, who releases the king from Gríma's spell. Éomer is set free and restored to honour. (Note: The Two Towers, book 3, ch. 6 "The King of the Golden Hall") He fights at the battle of Helm's Deep, where the forces of Rohan drive Saruman's army of Orcs and Dunlendings from the walls of the Hornburg, buying enough time for Gandalf to arrive with Erkenbrand and his men of the Westfold of Rohan. (Note: The Two Towers, book 3, ch. 7 "Helm's Deep")

Éomer plays a major role in the Battle of the Pelennor Fields, the pivotal battle of The Return of the King against the forces of the Dark Lord Sauron from Mordor. After leading a successful cavalry charge, he is dismayed to find Théoden mortally wounded. Théoden appoints him King of Rohan with his dying breath. Seeing Éowyn seemingly dead on the battlefield, Éomer throws himself and the remaining Rohirrim at the enemy. Aragorn arrives unexpectedly from Pelargir, and joins forces with Éomer, fulfilling his prediction that they would meet in the midst of their enemies. They rout the Orcs and win the battle. (Note: The Return of the King, book 5, ch. 6 "The Battle of the Pelennor Fields")

Éomer accompanies Aragorn to the Gates of Mordor for the final stand against Sauron, the Battle of the Morannon. (Note: The Return of the King, book 5, ch. 10 "The Black Gate Opens") This distracts Sauron long enough for the One Ring to be destroyed in Mount Doom, causing his immediate downfall. (Note: The Return of the King, book 6, ch. 3 "Mount Doom") Théoden is taken back to Edoras to be buried, and Éomer becomes King of the Mark. (Note: The Return of the King, book 6, ch. 6 "Many Partings")

=== Appendices ===
The Appendices to The Lord of the Rings add a few details. In 3021 of the Third Age, Éomer marries Lothíriel, only daughter of Imrahil, prince of Dol Amroth. She bears him a son, Elfwine the Fair, who becomes King of Rohan after his father. Tolkien fan fiction imagines many alternative lives for Lothíriel.

== Analysis ==
The name Éomer, meaning "Horse-famous" in Old English, occurs in Beowulf, at line 1959, as that of a king descended from Offa of the Angelcynn. Tolkien had studied Beowulf extensively and drew material from it in writing The Lord of the Rings.

The critic Paul Kocher notes that in his first meeting with Aragorn on the plains of Rohan, Éomer is moved by affection more than just by the policy of the Mark, and indeed he risks both his command and his life by assisting Aragorn, contrary to orders.

The Tolkien scholar Tom Shippey contrasts Éomer's behaviour with that of Faramir, son of the Ruling Steward of Gondor. In his view, Faramir is courteous, urbane, and civilised where Éomer is "compulsively truculent", in both cases reflecting the character of their nations: Gondor "a kind of Rome", subtle and calculating, Rohan a simple but vigorous Anglo-Saxon society. In his view, Rohan resembles Anglo-Saxon society in every way, except for one: the Anglo-Saxons did not like to fight on horseback.

Shippey writes further that prominent at the critical moment of the Battle of the Pelennor Fields, the decisive charge of the Riders of Rohan, is panache, which he explains means both "the white horsetail on [Eomer's] helm floating in his speed" and "the virtue of sudden onset, the dash that sweeps away resistance." Shippey notes that this allows Tolkien to display Rohan both as English, based on their Old English names and words like "eored" (troop of cavalry), and as "alien, to offer a glimpse of the way land shapes people".

== Adaptations ==
In the 1978 animated adaptation of The Lord of the Rings by Ralph Bakshi, Éomer has no lines and is not fully animated.

In Peter Jackson's The Lord of the Rings film trilogy, Éomer was played by the New Zealand actor Karl Urban.

Karl Urban as Éomer in Peter Jackson's The Lord of the Rings: The Two Towers

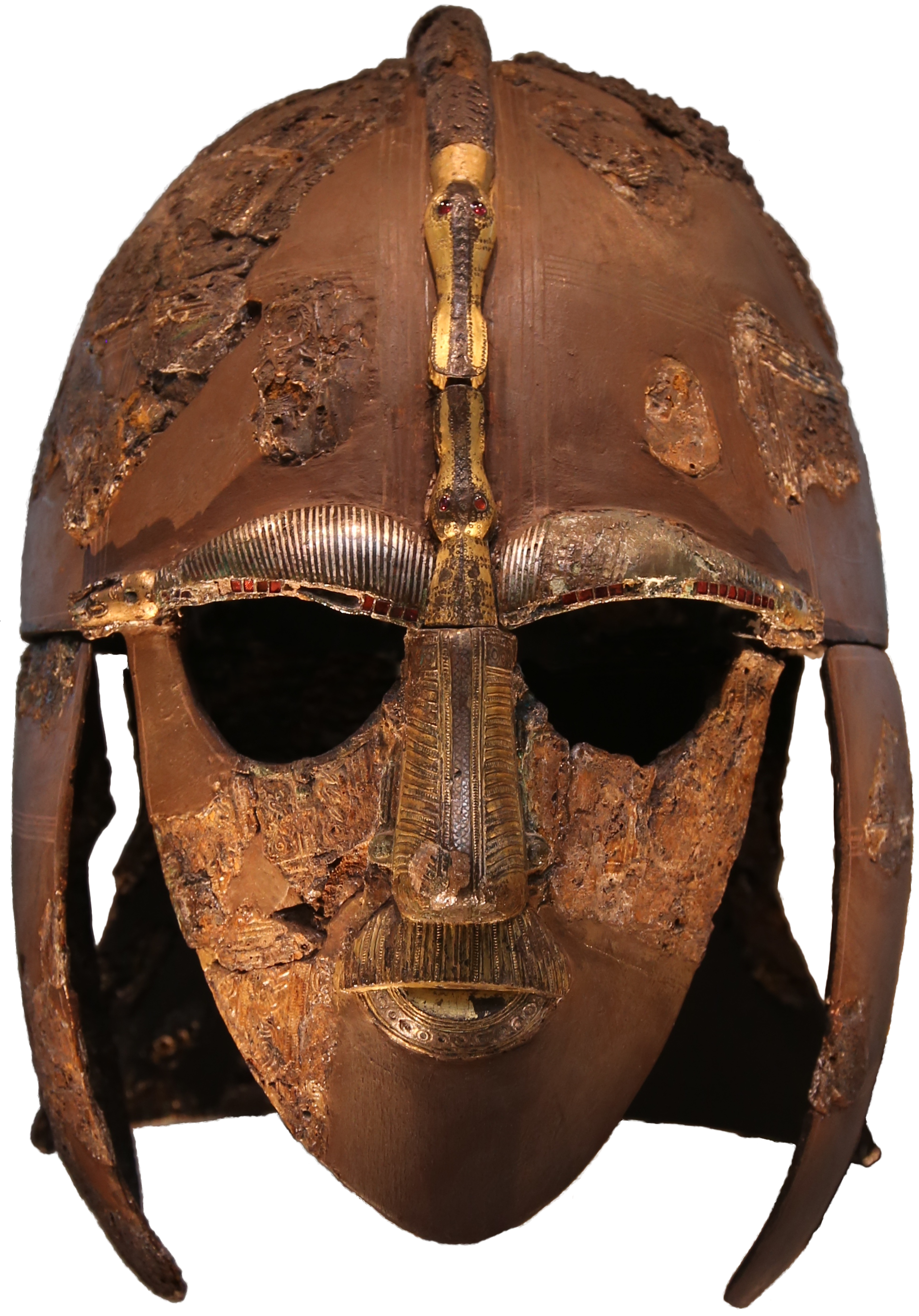
The Sutton Hoo helmet

Éomer's armour in the film is unmistakably Anglo-Saxon.

The Tolkien scholar Michael Drout states that Jackson's film version of Éomer's helmet is plainly based on the Sutton Hoo helmet, "the single most iconic image of Anglo-Saxon culture". Tolkien, he notes, had denied that the Riders of Rohan were actually the Anglo-Saxons, though he had made them speak the Mercian dialect of that language. In a book, Drout states, there can be ambiguity about visual images which are always partly in the reader's imagination; but a film inevitably reduces that useful ambiguity. Éomer's crest of horsetail, and the riders' flaxen hair give the impression of "continental Gothic" rather than Anglo-Saxons, but the film collapses that ambiguity. Drout further contrasts Jackson's presentation of Éomer in close-up in his elaborate helmet (scene 11 of The Two Towers), with the later scene of an Easterling soldier whose helmet covers his face. Drout writes that this carries the suggestion of "veiling and Orientalism", whereas Éomer's face can be seen between his cheek-guards, making him seem more open and less threatening.
