= Anna Smol =

Canadian literary scholar

- Citizenship: Canada
- Occupations: English professor, author
- Known for: "Oh ... Oh ... Frodo! Readings of Male Intimacy in The Lord of the Rings"
- Title: Scholar of literature

Academic background
- Education: Loyola College, Queen's University at Kingston
- Alma mater: Mount Saint Vincent University

Academic work
- Main interests: Medieval literature, Tolkien studies

Anna Smol is a professor emerita at Mount Saint Vincent University, Nova Scotia. She is known as a Tolkien scholar and for her research in Old English.

== Biography ==
Anna Smol grew up in Montreal, and took her bachelor's degree there at Loyola College. She did her master's degree and PhD in Old English literature at Queen's University at Kingston, Ontario. She then joined the faculty at Mount Saint Vincent University, Nova Scotia, where she remained for the rest of her working life.

Smol's research includes Tolkien studies, medievalism, and Old English literature, which she describes as overlapping fields. She has published at least 14 peer-reviewed Tolkien articles and many conference papers, on topics such as Tolkien's poetry, the influence of his wartime experience, and sexuality in The Lord of the Rings. She contributed the essay "Gender in Tolkien's Works" to the J.R.R. Tolkien Encyclopedia.

== Honours and distinctions ==
In 2023, Smol won Mount Saint Vincent University's Research Excellence Award.

Her research article "Tolkien, 'The Battle of Maldon', and 'The Homecoming of Beorhtnoth': Poetic Allusions and the Experience of Time" was shortlisted for the Tolkien Society's 2025 best article award.
