= Robin Anne Reid =

American scholar of feminist literature

- Citizenship: United States
- Occupations: English professor, author, editor
- Title: Scholar of literature

Academic background
- Education: Western Washington University; Middlebury College; University of Washington

Academic work
- Main interests: Feminist studies, Tolkien studies

Robin Anne Reid is a scholar of literature who has specialized in feminist studies and Tolkien studies. She was a professor of English at Texas A&M University until her retirement in 2020.

== Biography ==
Robin Anne Reid took her B.A. and M.A. at Western Washington University in 1979 and 1981, followed by an MA at Middlebury College in 1984. She completed her Ph.D. at the University of Washington in 1992. She has taught courses at both undergraduate and graduate level on topics in literature including fantasy and Tolkien. She began her career at Western Washington University in 1979, moving successively to Boise State University in 1985 and Olympic Community College in 1989. She then served as a professor of English from 1993 at Texas A&M University. She retired in May 2020, refusing the title of "Professor Emerita", and using instead the description "independent scholar". In a 2022 article, she described herself as "A Queer Atheist Feminist Autist". She studied feminism for some ten years and then switched to Tolkien studies. She has also written on fantasy and science fiction more widely, such as on Arthur C. Clarke.

Reid's work on J. R. R. Tolkien and his Middle-earth writings includes papers and a bibliographic essay on Tolkien and race. She has written on homosexuality in Tolkien's text and fan responses to it. With Judy Ann Ford, she has contributed to scholarly analysis of Peter Jackson's film interpretation of The Lord of the Rings.

== Reception ==
Reviewing Reid's book Women in Science Fiction and Fantasy, K. A. Laity wrote that it is an "immense, glossy reference book ... aimed at the library market", with a scope spanning both academic and fan sources.

Benjamin Lawson writes of Reid's Ray Bradbury: A Critical Companion that it succeeds in being useful to the general reader, having been designed as an introduction for young adults. Lawson finds the "Alternative Perspectives" section at the end of the analysis of each of Bradbury's books "the chief novelty and sophistication" of this particular Companion. In the space of three pages each, these sections give an update on recent theory, including in some cases gender or "more daringly" queer theory.

== Books ==
=== Authored ===
- 1997: Arthur C. Clarke: A Critical Companion. Greenwood Press.
- 2000: Ray Bradbury: A Critical Companion. Greenwood Press.

=== Edited ===
- 2009: The Encyclopedia of Women in Science Fiction and Fantasy. Greenwood Press.
- 2009: The Green Book of Westmarch. (with Judy Ann Ford). Resources gathered for the National Endowment for the Humanities Summer Institute.
