= Théoden =

Fictional king in The Lord of the Rings

- Middle-earth character

In-universe information
- Aliases: Lord of the Mark, King of Rohan
- Race: Men of Rohan (Note: Tolkien 1954, book 3, ch. 6 "The King of the Golden Hall")
- Book(s): The Two Towers (1954); The Return of the King (1955); Unfinished Tales (1980)

Théoden is a fictional character in J. R. R. Tolkien's fantasy novel, The Lord of the Rings. The King of Rohan and Lord of the Mark or of the Riddermark, names used by the Rohirrim for their land, he appears as a supporting character in The Two Towers and The Return of the King. When first introduced, Théoden is weak with age and sorrow and the machinations of his top advisor, Gríma Wormtongue, and he does nothing as his kingdom is crumbling. Once roused by the wizard Gandalf, however, he becomes an instrumental ally in the war against Saruman and Sauron, leading the Rohirrim into the Battle of the Pelennor Fields.

Scholars have compared Théoden to Theodoric, King of the Visigoths, and Théoden's death in the battle to Theodoric's in the Battle of the Catalaunian Fields. He has been contrasted, too, with another protagonist in The Lord of the Rings, Denethor Steward of Gondor; where Denethor is harsh, Théoden is open and welcoming.

== Fictional biography ==
=== The Two Towers ===
Théoden is introduced in The Two Towers, the second volume of The Lord of the Rings, as King of Rohan. By this point Théoden had grown weak with age, and was largely controlled by his chief advisor Gríma Wormtongue, who was secretly in the employ of the corrupt wizard Saruman. One of the last Hunt for the Ring manuscripts says Wormtongue has "great influence over the king", who is "enthralled by his counsel". In Unfinished Tales, it is further implied that the failure of the king's health was "...induced or increased by subtle poisons, administered by Gríma". (Note: Tolkien 1980, Part 3, ch. 5 "The Battles of the Fords of Isen") As Théoden sat powerless, Rohan was troubled by Orcs and Dunlendings, who operated under the will of Saruman, ruling from Isengard.

At that sound the bent shape of [King Théoden] sprang suddenly erect. Tall and proud he seemed again; and rising in his stirrups he cried in a loud voice, more clear than any there had ever heard a mortal man achieve before: 'Arise, arise, Riders of Théoden! Fell deeds awake: fire and slaughter! spear shall be shaken, shield be splintered, a sword-day, a red day, ere the sun rises! Ride now, ride now! Ride to Gondor!'

— J.R.R. Tolkien, The Return of the King

When Gandalf and Aragorn, along with Legolas and Gimli, appeared before him in The Two Towers, Théoden initially rebuffed the wizard's advice to oppose Saruman. When Gandalf revealed Wormtongue for what he was, however, Théoden returned to his senses. He restored his nephew, took up his sword Herugrim, and in spite of his age, led the Riders of Rohan to victory in the Battle of Helm's Deep. (Note: Tolkien 1954, book 3, ch. 7 "Helm's Deep") He then visited Isengard, saw that it had been destroyed by the Ents of Fangorn forest, (Note: Tolkien 1954, book 3, ch. 8 "The Road to Isengard") and, speaking with the wizard Saruman in the tower of Orthanc, saw Gandalf break Saruman's staff. (Note: Tolkien 1954, book 3, ch. 10 "The Voice of Saruman")

=== The Return of the King ===
In The Return of the King, Théoden led the Rohirrim to the aid of Gondor at the Battle of the Pelennor Fields. (Note: Tolkien 1955, book 5, ch. 3 "The Muster of Rohan") (Note: Tolkien 1955, book 5, ch. 5 "The Ride of the Rohirrim") In that battle, he routed the Harad cavalry, personally killing their chieftain. He challenged the Witch-king of Angmar, the leader of the Nazgûl, but was mortally wounded when his own horse Snowmane fell upon him. He was avenged by his niece Éowyn and a Hobbit, Merry Brandybuck, who had ridden to war together in secret; together, they destroyed the Witch-king. (Note: Tolkien 1955, book 5, ch. 6 "The Battle of the Pelennor Fields")

Théoden's body lay in Minas Tirith until it was buried in Rohan after the defeat of Sauron. He was the last of the Second Line of the kings, judging from direct descent from Eorl the Young. He was succeeded as King by his nephew Éomer. (Note: Tolkien 1955, book 6, ch. 5 "The Steward and the King")

== Etymology ==
"þeoden", an Old English word for "prince" or "king"

Théoden is transliterated directly from the Old English þēoden, "king, prince", in turn from þeod, "a people, a nation". As with other descriptive names in his legendarium, Tolkien uses this name to create the impression that the text is historical. Tolkien mapped the Westron or Common Speech to modern English; the ancestral language of the Rohirrim in his system of invented languages would therefore map to Old English.

== Analysis ==
=== Images of Northern courage ===
According to the scholar Elizabeth Solopova, the character of Théoden was inspired by the concept of Northern courage in Norse mythology, particularly in the Beowulf epos: the protagonist of a story shows perseverance while knowing that he is going to be defeated and killed. This is reflected in Théoden's decision to ride against Sauron's far superior army in the Battle of the Pelennor Fields. There are also repeated references by Tolkien to a historic account of the Battle of the Catalaunian Fields by the 6th century historian Jordanes. Both battles take place between civilizations of the "East" (Huns) and "West" (Romans and their allies, Visigoths), and like Jordanes, Tolkien describes his battle as one of legendary fame that lasted for several generations. Another apparent similarity is the death of King Theodoric I of the Visigoths on the Catalaunian Fields and that of Théoden on the Pelennor. Jordanes reports that Theodoric was thrown off by his horse and trampled to death by his own men who charged forward. Théoden also rallies his men shortly before he falls and is crushed by his horse. And like Theodoric, Théoden is carried from the battlefield with his knights weeping and singing for him while the battle still goes on.

Elizabeth Solopova's comparison of Théoden and Theodoric
Situation	Théoden	Theodoric
Final battle	Battle of the Pelennor Fields	Battle of the Catalaunian Fields
Combatants "West" versus "East"	Rohan, Gondor vs Mordor, Easterlings	Romans, Visigoths vs Huns
Cause of death	Thrown by horse, which falls on him	Thrown by horse, trampled by own men, charging enemy
Lament	Carried from battlefield by his knights, singing and weeping	

Numerous scholars have admired Tolkien's simile of Théoden riding into his final battle "like a god of old, even as Oromë the Great in the battle of the Valar when the world was young". Among them, Steve Walker calls it "almost epic in its amplitude", inviting the reader's imagination by alluding "to unseen complexity", a whole mythology of Middle-earth under the visible text. Fleming Rutledge calls it imitative of the language of myth and saga, and an echo of the messianic prophecy in Malachi 4:1-3. Jason Fisher compares the passage, which links the blowing of all the horns of the host of Rohan, Oromë, dawn, and the Rohirrim, with Beowulf's pairing of ær dæge ("before day", i.e. "dawn") and Hygelaces horn ond byman ("Hygelac's horn and trumpet") in lines 2941-2944. (Note: Fisher writes that Oromë found the Elves in the far East of Middle-earth, so is linked with sunrise in the East, heralding a new beginning, and the Rohirrim's name for Oromë was Bema ("horn, trumpet"), the Old Mercian form of the Old English Byma used in the Beowulf passage.) Peter Kreeft writes that "it is hard not to feel your heart leap with joy at Théoden's transformation into a warrior", however difficult people find the old Roman view that it is sweet to die for your country, dulce et decorum est pro patria mori.

The Tolkien scholar Tom Shippey writes that Rohan is directly calqued on Anglo-Saxon England, taking many features from Beowulf, and not only in personal names, place-names, and language. He states that Tolkien's lament for Théoden equally closely echoes the dirge that ends the Old English poem Beowulf. Théoden's warriors and gate-guards behave like Beowulf characters, making their own minds up rather than just saying "I was only obeying orders".

=== Théoden vs Denethor ===
Tolkien scholars including Jane Chance contrast Théoden with another "Germanic king", Denethor, the last of the Ruling Stewards of Gondor. In Chance's view, Théoden represents good, Denethor evil; she notes that their names are almost anagrams, and that where Théoden welcomes the hobbit Merry Brandybuck into his service with loving friendship, Denethor accepts Merry's friend, Pippin Took with a harsh contract of fealty. Hilary Wynne, in The J. R. R. Tolkien Encyclopedia, writes further that where both Théoden and Denethor had despaired, Théoden, his courage "renewed" by Gandalf, went to a hopeless-seeming battle at Helm's Deep and won, and then again on the Pelennor Fields where "his attack saved the city of Minas Tirith from sack and destruction". Shippey makes the same comparison, extending it to numerous elements of the two Men's stories, writing that Théoden lives by a theory of Northern courage, and dies through Denethor's despair.

Tom Shippey's analysis of symmetry in the tales of Théoden and Denethor
Story element	Théoden, King of Rohan	Denethor, Steward of Gondor
Subgroup meets a helpful stranger	Aragorn, Gimli and Legolas meet Éomer	Frodo and Sam meet Faramir
Subgroup leader confronts the stranger	Aragorn defies Éomer	Frodo hides his quest from Faramir
Stranger decides to help the group, against their superior's wishes	Éomer lends horses	Faramir lets Frodo and Sam go
Leader is an old man who has lost a son	Théodred died in battle	Boromir died saving the Hobbits
Leader sees other heir as "doubtful replacement"	Éomer is a nephew	Faramir is scholarly, not warlike
Leader dies at time of Battle of the Pelennor Fields	Théoden dies in battle	Denethor commits suicide during battle
Leader's hall is described in detail	Meduseld, the "golden hall"	The stone hall in Minas Tirith
A Hobbit swears allegiance to leader	Merry joins the Riders of Rohan	Pippin becomes a palace guard of Gondor

== In adaptations ==
Théoden in Ralph Bakshi's animated version of The Lord of the Rings

In the 1981 BBC Radio 4 version of The Lord of the Rings, Théoden's death is described in song rather than dramatized conventionally; he is voiced by Jack May. In Ralph Bakshi's 1978 animated version of The Lord of the Rings, the voice of Théoden was provided by Philip Stone. Théoden appears in Rankin/Bass's television film adaptation of The Return of the King, though he speaks little, and is voiced by Don Messick. His death is narrated by Gandalf (voiced by John Huston); in the animation, he is killed by a cloud, not by the Witch-king.

Bernard Hill as King Théoden in Peter Jackson's The Lord of the Rings: The Return of the King

Théoden is an important character in Peter Jackson's Lord of the Rings film trilogy. The character, played by Bernard Hill, first appears in The Two Towers (2002). However, unlike in the books, the Lord of the Mark is actually possessed and prematurely aged by Saruman (Christopher Lee). Gandalf (Ian McKellen) releases him from the spell, instantly restoring him to his true age, after which Théoden banishes Gríma Wormtongue (Brad Dourif) from Edoras.
