= Éowyn =

Fictional noblewoman in The Lord of the Rings

- Middle-earth character

In-universe information
- Aliases: Dernhelm, Shieldmaid of Rohan
- Race: Rohirrim
- Spouse: Faramir
- Book(s): The Two Towers (1954); The Return of the King (1955)

Éowyn (/ˈeɪoʊwɪn/ or /ˈeɪoʊwuːn/ (Note: Tolkien 1955, Appendix E, "Note")) is a fictional character in J. R. R. Tolkien's The Lord of the Rings. She is a noblewoman of Rohan who describes herself as a shieldmaiden. With the hobbit Merry Brandybuck, she rides into battle and kills the Witch-King of Angmar, Lord of the Nazgûl, in the Battle of the Pelennor Fields. This fulfils the Macbeth-like prophecy that he would not be killed by a man.

Éowyn's brief courtship by Faramir has been seen by scholars as influenced by Tolkien's experience of war brides from the First World War. She has been seen, too, as one of the few strong female characters in the story, especially as interpreted in Peter Jackson's film trilogy, where her role, played by Miranda Otto, is far more romantic than Tolkien made her.

== Narrative ==
In The Two Towers, Éowyn, a daughter of the House of Eorl and the niece of King Théoden of Rohan, is introduced in Meduseld, the King's hall at Edoras. She is the daughter of Éomund and Théodwyn (Théoden's sister), and the sister of Éomer. When she is only seven years old, her father is killed fighting orcs, and her mother dies of grief. Éowyn and Éomer are raised in her uncle's household as his own children. (Note: Tolkien 1954, book 3, ch. 6 "The King of the Golden Hall") (Note: Tolkien 1955, Appendix A, "The House of Eorl")

She longs to win renown in battle—especially since she is royal—but being female, her duties are reckoned to be at Edoras. (Note: Tolkien 1955, book 5, ch. 8 "The Houses of Healing") When Théoden's mind is poisoned by his corrupt adviser Gríma Wormtongue, Éowyn is obliged to care for her uncle, and his deterioration pains her deeply. To make matters worse, she is constantly harassed by Gríma, who lusts after her. When Gandalf arrives, he frees Théoden from Wormtongue's influence. Éowyn falls in love with Aragorn, but though he respects her, he does not return her feelings, as he is betrothed to the elf Arwen. As Aragorn points out, (Note: Tolkien 1955, book 5, ch. 2 "The Passing of the Grey Company") her duty is with her people; she has to shoulder the responsibility of ruling Rohan in Théoden's stead when the war-host of Rohan go to war.

I am weary of skulking in halls, and wish to face peril and battle. … am I not of the House of Eorl, a shieldmaiden … may I not now spend my life as I will? … All your words are but to say: you are a woman and your part is in the house. But when the men have died in battle and honour, you have leave to be burned in the house, for the men will need it no more. But I am of the House of Eorl and not a serving-woman. I can ride and wield blade, and I do not fear either pain or death. …[I fear] A cage, To stay behind bars, until use and old age accept them, and all chance of doing great deeds is gone beyond recall or desire.

Éowyn disguises herself as a man and, under the alias of Dernhelm (from Old English dern meaning "secret, concealed"), travels with the Riders of Rohan to the battle outside Minas Tirith in Gondor on her horse Windfola, carrying with her the hobbit Merry Brandybuck, who had also been ordered to remain behind. (Note: Tolkien 1955, book 5, ch. 3 "The Muster of Rohan")

In the Battle of the Pelennor Fields, she confronts the Witch-King of Angmar, Lord of the Nazgûl, after Théoden is mortally injured. The Witch-King threatens that he will "bear thee away to the houses of lamentation, beyond all darkness, where thy flesh shall be devoured, and thy shrivelled mind be left naked to the Lidless Eye". He boasts "No living man may hinder me", (Note: Tolkien 1955, book 5, ch. 6 "The Battle of the Pelennor Fields") whereupon Éowyn removes her helmet and declares:

But no living man am I! You look upon a woman. Éowyn I am, Éomund's daughter. You stand between me and my lord and kin. Begone, if you be not deathless! For living or dark undead, I will smite you, if you touch him.

The Nazgûl leader's flying steed attacks Éowyn, but she kills it, cutting off its head with her sword. The Nazgûl then shatters her shield and breaks her shield-arm with his mace, but is distracted by Merry, who stabs him behind the knee with a barrow-blade. Éowyn seizes the opportunity to strike the Nazgûl with a killing thrust "between crown and mantle". Then, as her sword shatters, his withering form collapses and he vanishes with a final cry of anguish. Éowyn passes out from the pain in her arm, and is believed dead until Prince Imrahil realizes she still lives. Éowyn is brought to the Houses of Healing, hovering near death from the effects of having struck the Nazgûl. There Éowyn meets Faramir, with whom she soon falls in love. Her outlook on life also changes: "Then the heart of Éowyn changed, or else at last she understood it. ... I will be a shieldmaiden no longer, nor vie with the great Riders, nor take joy only in the songs of slaying. I will be a healer, and love all things that grow and are not barren." (Note: Tolkien 1955, book 6, ch. 5 "The Steward and the King")

After the demise of Sauron, Éowyn and Faramir marry and settle in Ithilien, of which Faramir is made the ruling Prince by Aragorn. (Note: Tolkien 1955, book 6, ch. 6 "Many Partings") Faramir and Éowyn have a son, Elboron. (Note: Tolkien 1996, ch. 7 "The Heirs of Elendil")

== Concept and creation ==
Originally, Tolkien intended for Éowyn to marry Aragorn. Later, however, he decided against it because Aragorn was "too old and lordly and grim". He considered making Éowyn the twin sister of Éomund, and having her die "to avenge or save Théoden". He also considered having Aragorn truly love Éowyn and regret never marrying after her death. Tolkien once described Éowyn as "a stern Amazon woman". (Note: Tolkien 1989, ch. 26 "The King of the Golden Hall") Later he wrote: "Though not a 'dry nurse' in temper, she was also not really a soldier or 'Amazon', but like many brave women was capable of great military gallantry at a crisis." (Note: Carpenter 2023, #244, from a draft to a reader of The Lord of the Rings) (Here he alludes to Éowyn's statement to Aragorn: "But am I not of the House of Eorl, a shieldmaiden and not a dry-nurse?")

In Old English, the language Tolkien used to represent his invented language of Rohirric, the word eoh means "war-horse" while wyn means "delight", so Éowyn can be taken to mean "Delight in horses". Her name in Rohirric is not given, but it would have started with the element Lô- or Loh-, meaning "horse".

== Analysis ==
Julaire Andelin, in the J.R.R. Tolkien Encyclopedia, writes that prophecy in Middle-earth depended on characters' understanding of the Music of the Ainur, the divine plan for Arda, and was often ambiguous. Thus, Glorfindel's prophecy "not by the hand of man will [the Lord of the Nazgûl] fall" did not lead the Lord of the Nazgûl to suppose that he would die at the hands of a woman and a hobbit. (Note: Tolkien 1955, Appendix A, "Gondor and the Heirs of Anárion") The Tolkien scholar Tom Shippey states that the prophecy, and the Witch-king's surprise at finding Dernhelm to be a woman, parallel the witches' statement to Macbeth that he may "laugh to scorn / The power of man, for none of woman born / Shall harm Macbeth" (Act 4, scene 1), and Macbeth's shock at learning that Macduff "was from his mother's womb / Untimely ripp'd" (as Macduff was born by Caesarean section: Act 5, scene 8). Thus, Shippey notes, despite Tolkien's stated dislike of Shakespeare's treatment of myth, he read Macbeth closely.

Tolkien's First World War experience of war brides may be reflected in Éowyn's brief courtship. The scholar of literature Melissa A. Smith notes that Tolkien wrote in response to criticism that "In my experience feelings and decisions ripen very quickly (as measured by mere 'clock-time', which is actually not justly applicable) in periods of great stress, and especially under the expectation of imminent death". (Note: Carpenter 2023, #244 to a reader of The Lord of the Rings, fragment, c. 1963) She notes that Tolkien indeed married Edith Bratt just before he was posted to the Western Front in France.

Thum states that Éowyn wears in turn two masks, the first unconventional, the second conventional. She appears initially as a medieval romance heroine, a "woman clad in white", standing silent and obedient behind King Théoden's throne. But soon it becomes clear that she is no meek subordinate, as "she looked on the king with cool pity in her eyes": she thinks for herself. Further, she appears conventionally beautiful as a romance lady: "Very fair was her face, and her long hair was like a river of gold." But, Thum writes, this too is swiftly gainsaid: "Slender and tall she was ... but strong she seemed and stern as steel, a daughter of kings." Éowyn's second mask is the appearance of a male Rider of Rohan, "Dernhelm", as, against orders, she rides to battle. In Old English dern means "secret, concealed", while helm is "helmet", a covering for the head. Thum comments that this unconventional mask conveys Éowyn's rebellious nature far more powerfully than would any overt account of her thinking.

Jessica Yates wrote that Éowyn meets all the requirements for a classic woman warrior: a strong identity; skill in fighting; weapons and armour; a horse; special powers, seen when she turns the Ringwraith's prophecy of doom back onto him; and being modest and chaste. Carol Leibiger added that Éowyn is the only strong human female in The Lord of the Rings (Galadriel and Arwen being Elves), noting that her rejection of the woman's place in the home leads her to fulfil the prophecy about the leader of the Ringwraiths, the Witch-King of Angmar, that "not by the hand of man will [he] fall".

Melissa Hatcher wrote in Mythlore that The Lord of the Rings has as a central theme the way that "the littlest person, a hobbit, overcom[es] the tides of war": that the real power is that of healing, protecting, and preserving. She noted that Éowyn tries the path of the warrior and then becomes a healer, and that some academics have interpreted her choice as weak submission. Hatcher stated that instead, Éowyn is following Tolkien's "highest ideal: a fierce commitment to peace", embodying the "full-blooded subjectivity" that Tolkien believed necessary for peace. She described Éowyn as "a complete individual who fulfills Tolkien's theme of peace, preservation, and cultural memory."

Hatcher cited the philosopher Gregory Bassham's list of the six essential ingredients of happiness in Middle-earth, namely "delight in simple things, making light of one's troubles, getting personal, cultivating good character, cherishing and creating beauty, and rediscovering wonder", and stated that these are all seen in Éowyn and the Hobbit Sam, the gardener who inherits Frodo's Bag End and restores the Shire, "but in very few others".

== Portrayal in adaptations ==
Éowyn in Ralph Bakshi's 1978 animated film The Lord of the Rings

=== Early films ===
Nellie Bellflower voiced Éowyn in the 1980 Rankin/Bass animated version of The Return of the King. Elin Jenkins voiced the character in BBC Radio's 1981 serialisation. Éowyn appears briefly in Ralph Bakshi's 1978 adaptation of The Lord of the Rings.

=== Peter Jackson ===
Éowyn is played by Miranda Otto in Peter Jackson's film series.

In Peter Jackson's films The Lord of the Rings: The Two Towers (2002) and The Lord of the Rings: The Return of the King (2003), Éowyn is played by Miranda Otto. Uma Thurman was slated for the role at one point. Although Jackson cuts much of Tolkien's poetry and song, he adds a scene with Éowyn singing a dirge at Théodred's funeral.

Shippey states that the Hollywood studio sent a "script doctor" to New Zealand to bring Jackson's direction into line with their view, which was that since Aragorn needed a single love interest, Arwen could be deleted and "Aragorn should then marry Éowyn instead of politely dissuading her. ... The script doctor's advice was ignored." Brian Robb and Paul Simpson concur with Shippey that Jackson does, however, make Aragorn far more romantic than do either Tolkien or Bakshi, devoting substantial viewing time to Aragorn's "modern love triangle" and providing "clear on-screen chemistry" with Éowyn.

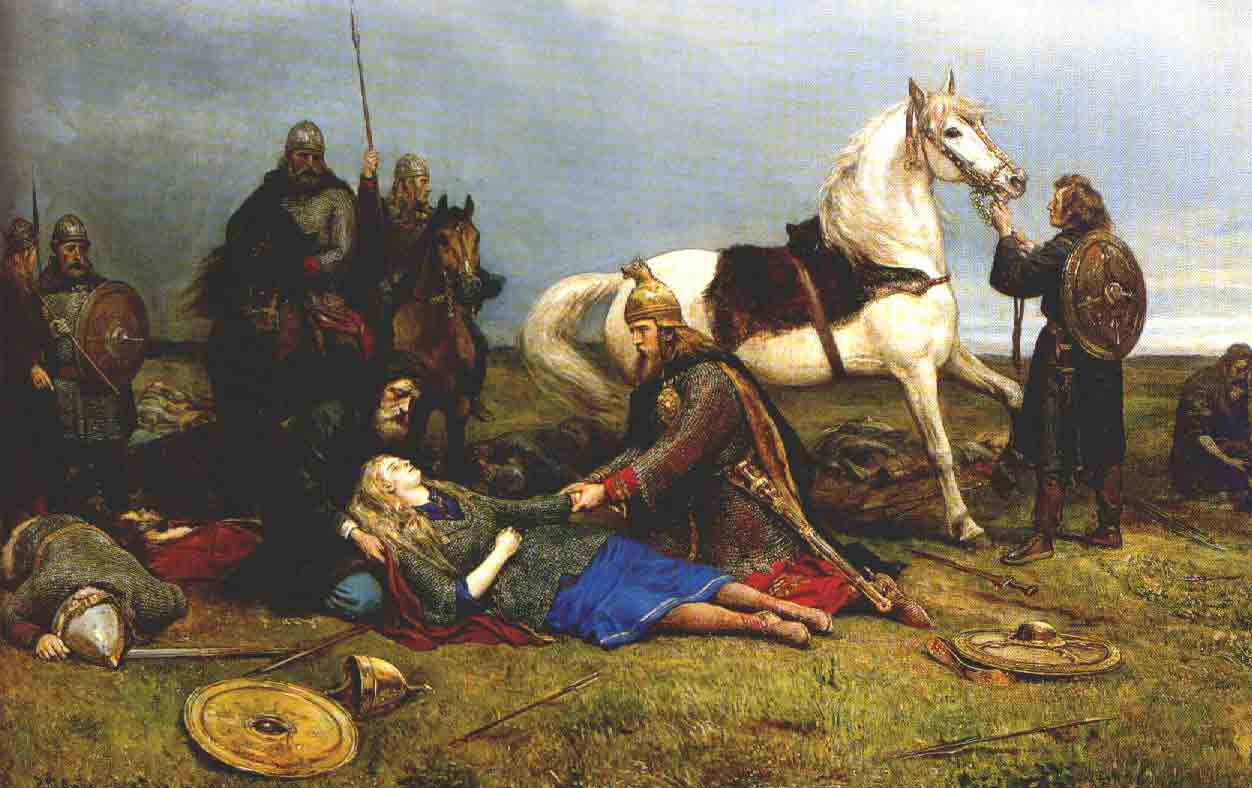
Éowyn's appearance on the Pelennor Fields has been compared to that of the shieldmaiden Hervor in the "Battle of the Goths and Huns", as depicted in Hervor's Death by Peter Nicolai Arbo.

The scholar of English Helen Young writes that while neither Tolkien nor Jackson give Éowyn any thanks for killing the Witch-King, Jackson's film version does at least invert the gender roles depicted by the Norwegian artist Peter Nicolai Arbo in his 19th century painting Hervor's Death, though when she falls as if dead, the film scene looks in her opinion much like that in the painting. The film reduces Éowyn's role as cup-bearer, which in Tolkien's text describes a genuine Germanic ceremony in which a woman embodied the weaving of peace. Young suggests this was because the screenwriters feared the audience would misinterpret the scene. The extended edition of the "Return to Edoras" scene however includes the ceremony for Théoden.

The film scholar Sarah Kozloff writes that, if the film series can be seen as a melodrama, Jackson's Éowyn symbolizes the modern "tomboy/feminist" psychic figure, the role being played "in a realistic performance style".

Feminist scholar Penny Griffin writes that in The Lord of the Rings: The Return of the King, Éowyn is "probably the movies' closest approximation to an SFC [Strong Female Character]". Her credentials for this, Griffin notes, include rebelling against the injunction to stay behind when the Riders of Rohan go off to fight, disguising herself as a man, riding to battle, and fighting the leader of the Ringwraiths. The feminist effect is spoiled, Griffin notes, when her story ends (according to Tolkien's text, not the film) with her disavowing battle and marrying Faramir to live "happily every after".

The scholar of literature Maureen Thum comments that Jackson "stresses what Tolkien implies" by portraying Éowyn's feelings for Aragorn and her skill in battle. Thum writes that Tolkien's narrative, having Éowyn ride to war under the name "Dernhelm", meaning "secret helmet", far more powerfully conveys her rebellious nature than would any explicit description of her thinking. The Tolkien scholar Jane Chance notes that Jackson's Two Towers includes a moment of swordplay between Éowyn and Aragorn, the latter using a knife; Chance describes this as "a scene of sexual symbolism nowhere found in Tolkien's text".

In Kenji Kamiyama's 2024 anime fantasy film The Lord of the Rings: The War of the Rohirrim, a prequel to Jackson's films, Otto reprised her role as Éowyn, while also serving as the film's narrator.
