= Women in The Lord of the Rings =

Theme in Tolkien's fantasy

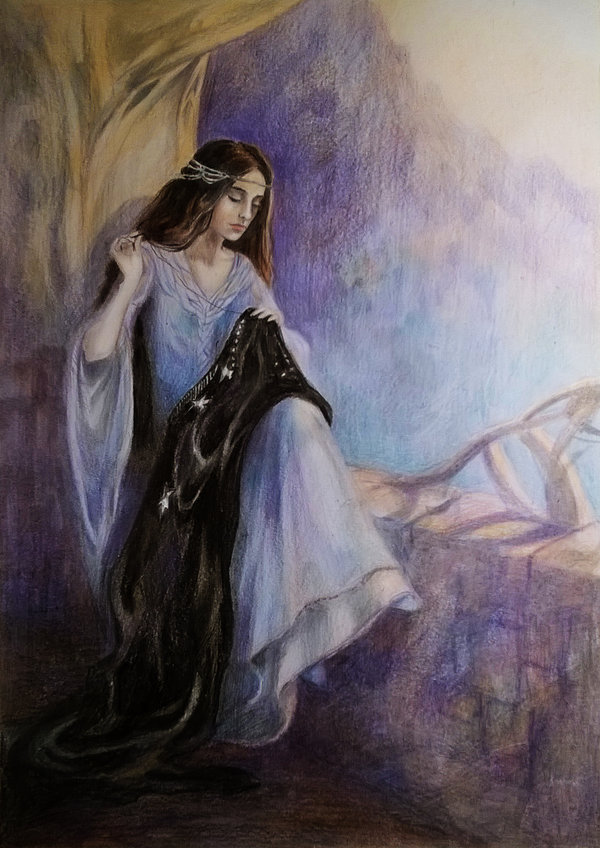
Some commentators describe Tolkien as placing women only in background roles while the male protagonists see all the action. Arwen sewing Aragorn's banner, by Anna Kulisz, 2015, inspired by Edmund Leighton's 1911 Stitching the Standard.

The roles of women in The Lord of the Rings have often been assessed as insignificant, or important only in relation to male characters in a story about men for boys. Meanwhile, other commentators have noted the empowerment of the three major women characters, Galadriel, Éowyn, and Arwen, and provided in-depth analysis of their roles within the narrative of The Lord of the Rings.

Weronika Łaszkiewicz has written that "Tolkien's heroines have been both praised and severely criticized", and that his fictional women have an ambiguous image, of "both passivity and empowerment". J. R. R. Tolkien spent much of his life in an all-male environment, and had conservative views about women, prompting discussion of possible sexism. Much of the action in The Lord of the Rings is by male characters, and the nine-person Company of the Ring is entirely male.

On the other hand, commentators have noted that the Elf-queen Galadriel is powerful and wise; Éowyn, noblewoman of Rohan, is extraordinarily courageous, attempting to kill the leader of the Nazgûl; the Elf Arwen, who chooses mortality to be with Aragorn, the man she loves, is central to the book's theme of death and immortality; and that other female figures like the monstrous spider Shelob and the wise-woman of Gondor, Ioreth, play important roles in the narrative. Tolkien stated that the Hobbit woman Rosie Cotton is "absolutely essential" to understanding the hero Sam's character, and the relation of ordinary life to heroism. (Note: Carpenter 2023, #131 to Milton Waldman, 1951)

== Tolkien's background ==
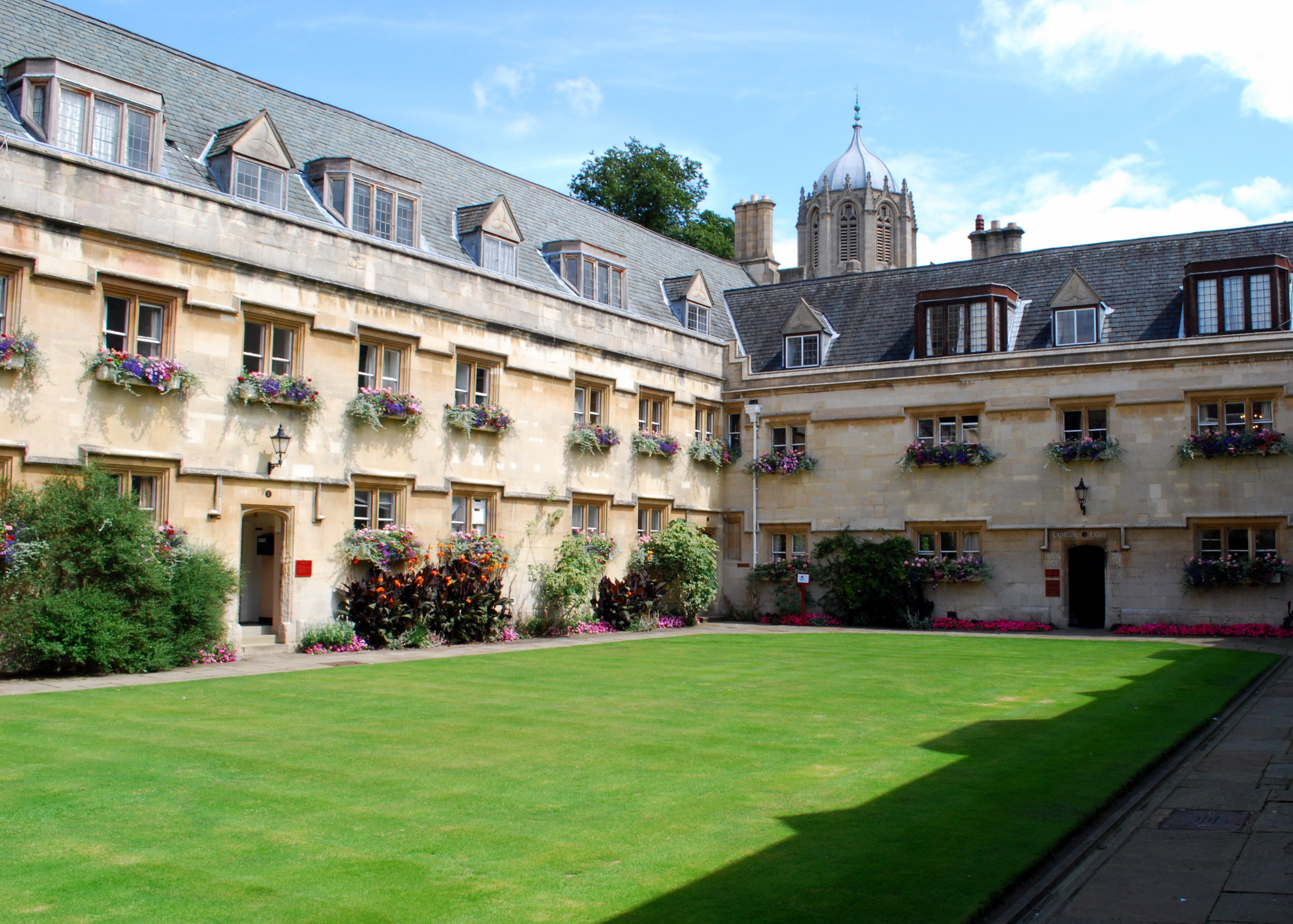
Secluded male environment: Pembroke College's Old Quad, where Tolkien had his teaching rooms

The author of the bestselling fantasy novel The Lord of the Rings, J. R. R. Tolkien, was orphaned as a boy, his father dying in South Africa and his mother in England a few years later. He was brought up by his guardian, a Catholic priest, Father Francis Xavier Morgan, and educated at boys' grammar schools and then Exeter College, Oxford, which at that time had only male students. He joined the British Army's Lancashire Fusiliers and saw the horror of trench warfare, with life as an officer made more bearable by the support of a male batman or servant. After the war he became a professor of English Language at the University of Leeds, and then at the University of Oxford, where he taught at Pembroke College. At Oxford, he created an all-male literary group with another Oxford professor of English, C. S. Lewis, called the Inklings.

Among Tolkien's influences, he stated that he enjoyed reading boys' adventure stories, such as those by H. Rider Haggard and John Buchan. Tolkien stated in an interview that Haggard's novel She was his favourite. The scholar of English literature Dale Nelson notes that Tolkien "was evidently spontaneously moved by mythopoeic and straightforward adventure romance" as in Haggard's books. On Buchan's influence, Nelson writes that Greenmantle tells "of desperate chances and plentiful good luck, of cross-country pursuit and massive battles ... [and] the heroism of a handful of men". In On Fairy Stories, Tolkien wrote that "Treasure Island left me cool. Red Indians were better: there were bows and arrows ..., and strange languages, and glimpses of an archaic way of life, and, above all, forests in such stories. But the land of Merlin and Arthur (Note: Arthurian legend, retold in modern works such as Alfred Tennyson's The Lady of Shalott and Galahad.) was better than these, and best of all the nameless North of Sigurd and the Volsungs, (Note: Norse saga, retold in William Morris's 1876 The Story of Sigurd the Volsung and the Fall of the Niblungs.) and the prince of all dragons. Such lands were pre-eminently desirable."

As seen in a letter to his son Michael Tolkien, he held conservative views about women, stating that men were active in their professions while women were inclined to domestic life. (Note: Carpenter 2023, #43 to Michael Tolkien, 6–8 March 1941) While defending the role of women in The Lord of the Rings, the scholar of children's literature Melissa Hatcher wrote that "Tolkien himself, in reality, probably was the stodgy sexist Oxford professor that feminist scholars paint him out to be".

== Roles for women ==
=== A story about men for boys ===
The Lord of the Rings has repeatedly been discussed as being a story about men for boys, with no significant women characters; there are 11 women in the work, some of them mentioned only briefly. Catherine Stimpson, a scholar of English and feminism, wrote that Tolkien's women were "hackneyed ... stereotypes ... either beautiful and distant, simply distant, or simply simple".

Robert Butler and John Eberhard, in the Chicago Tribune, stated that all the races from Hobbits to Elves, Dwarves to Wizards, get their due in the novel, but "Women, on the other hand, do not." In their view, "Tolkien didn't think much about the female sex. Yes, he was happily married, and yes, he did have a daughter. But his wife, Edith Mary, and daughter, Priscilla, seemed to have practically no influence on his writing." They quoted the scholar of medieval and Old English literature, Linda Voigts, as defending Tolkien, pointing out that, brought up in a male world and living among male scholars at a time when "Oxford was a boys' club", he could not have been expected to be a modern feminist. Butler and Eberhard wrote that the women in the novel see little action, giving the example of Arwen. In their opinion, a strong-willed woman, Éowyn, was created when the teenaged Priscilla asked her father for a female character.

The critics Candice Fredrick and Sam McBride, referencing the all-male Inklings group, wrote that "Middle-earth is very Inkling-like, in that while women exist in the world, they need not be given significant attention and can, if one is lucky, simply be avoided altogether." Melissa McCrory Hatcher, while not discounting the women altogether, writes that Hobbit women like Rosie Cotton and Lobelia Sackville-Baggins serve "only as housewives or shrews", Dwarf women are hardly feminine, the Entwives are lost, and Goldberry "is a mystical washer-woman".

=== Few but powerful women ===
The Tolkien scholars Carol Leibiger, in the J.R.R. Tolkien Encyclopedia, and separately Maureen Thum, replied that Stimpson's charge was definitely disproven by Tolkien's vigorous characterisation of Éowyn (and in The Silmarillion by numerous strong female characters such as Lúthien). Liebiger stated that while Tolkien's female characters appear like "chaste medieval ladies of courtly romance", doing little but encouraging their menfolk to be heroic, the few prominent women in the narrative are in fact extremely powerful in their own right.

The theologian Ralph Wood replied that Galadriel, Éowyn, and Arwen are far from being "plaster figures": Galadriel is powerful, wise and "terrible in her beauty"; Éowyn has "extraordinary courage and valor"; and Arwen gives up her Elvish immortality to marry Aragorn. Further, Wood argued, Tolkien insisted that everyone, man and woman alike, faces the same kinds of temptation, hope, and desire.

The scholar of English literature Nancy Enright stated that the few female characters in The Lord of the Rings are extremely important in defining power, which she suggests is a central theme of the novel. She commented that even the apparently heroic male figures such as Aragorn and Faramir "use traditional masculine power in a manner tempered with an awareness of its limitations and a respect for another, deeper kind of power". She argued that Faramir's brother Boromir, who fits the picture of the powerful male warrior hero, is in fact "weaker morally and spiritually" than those who exercise the deeper kind of power, and noted that Boromir falls while the "less typically heroic characters", including all the women (and the apparently unheroic Hobbits) survive. She specifically denied that the absence of women in battle, Éowyn excepted, and among the nine members of the Fellowship of the Ring, meant that female power and presence are not important in the novel. On the contrary, she wrote, the women embody Tolkien's critique of the conventional view of power, and illustrate his Christian view that selfless love is stronger than selfish pride and any attempt to dominate by force. Liebiger noted that Tolkien's attitude towards destructive masculine power is "compatible with that of contemporary feminists".

Weronika Łaszkiewicz noted that "Tolkien's heroines have been both praised and severely criticized", stating that his fictional women have an ambiguous image, of "both passivity and empowerment". She suggested that this could be a result of his personal experience. Firstly, women in early 20th century England normally stayed at home and looked after the children, she noted, and Tolkien expected as much of his wife Edith, even though she was a skilful pianist. Secondly, his environment was overwhelmingly male, and other Inklings, especially Lewis, believed that "full intimacy with another man was impossible unless women were totally excluded" from their intellectual and artistic discussions; Łaszkiewicz notes that Edith resented the Inklings meetings.

The scholar of humanities Brian Rosebury wrote that Tolkien gave his mother's memory "something of the numinous intensity which radiates from the adored, benevolent, intimately present or achingly distant, feminine figures of his work", naming Galadriel, Arwen, Goldberry and the remote Varda/Elbereth. He adds that the differing interests of Tolkien and his wife Edith may be "dimly discernible" in the estrangement of the Ents and the Entwives, while their long-delayed romance is evident in Elrond (as Father Francis Xavier, Tolkien's guardian), who forbids Aragorn to marry Arwen unless he becomes king of Gondor and Arnor. He notes that the delayed marriage of the servant-hobbit Samwise "Sam" Gamgee and Rosie Cotton is a homelier echo of the theme.

=== A diverse roster ===
The female hobbit characters in The Lord of the Rings all have limited roles. They include Rosie Cotton, Sam's fiancé; Rosie's mother Mrs Cotton; Mrs Maggot, the wife of Farmer Maggot who assisted Frodo's departure from The Shire; and Lobelia Sackville-Baggins, the wife of Bilbo Baggins's cousin, who covets his Bag End residence and his collection of silver spoons. In the J.R.R. Tolkien Encyclopedia, Katherine Hasser observed a lack of role-separation between male and female Shire-folk, as several men perform domestic duties such as cooking, cleaning, arranging parties, purchasing and wrapping gifts; Bilbo in particular adopts and nurtures the young Frodo by himself.

Leslie A. Donovan writes that because there are rather few women in the book, feminist commentators such as Lisa Hopkins have argued that the scarce women are strong, authoritative, and disproportionately important to the narrative. Donovan calls this "the Valkyrie reflex", and argues against it, not least with the hobbit women. Lobelia "may be valkyrie-like, but her greediness and covetousness early in the texts are not common valkyrie traits", while "Rosie Cotton's teasing of Sam" is at best "vaguely reminiscent" of a valkyrie inciter, but "her wholesome ordinariness has no relationship to Odin's battle goddesses".

Ann Basso wrote in Mythlore that all the women in The Lord of the Rings are either noble or ethereal like Éowyn and Galadriel, or simple rustics like Rosie, with one exception: Goldberry, the River-woman's daughter, wife of Tom Bombadil, who appears as a biblical Eve figure to Galadriel's Mary. In her view, the "roster of women" are "rich and diverse [characters], well drawn, and worthy of respect". Hasser considered the most significant point about Goldberry's depiction as a feminine figure is that she shares domestic duties with her husband, and appears equal to him in status.

=== Mediating between epic fantasy and the reader's world ===
Commentators such as Megan N. Fontenot, Fleming Rutledge the theologian and Episcopal priest, and indeed Tolkien, have stated that the ordinary women, such as Rosie and the prattling woman of Gondor, Ioreth, have the vital role of mediating between the world of epic fantasy and ordinary life. Rosie's warm relationship with Sam allows readers to connect to Sam's heroic adventures, and in turn to the noble characters such as Aragorn that Sam encounters. Ioreth's transformation of the heroic events of the War of the Ring into stories she can tell to her country relative shows how actual events turn first into shared stories and then into epic. This allows the reader to see the narrative in The Lord of the Rings as the result of the inevitable changes wrought by the passage of time as Middle-earth in the distant past changes into the present-day Earth.

== The powerful women ==
=== Galadriel ===
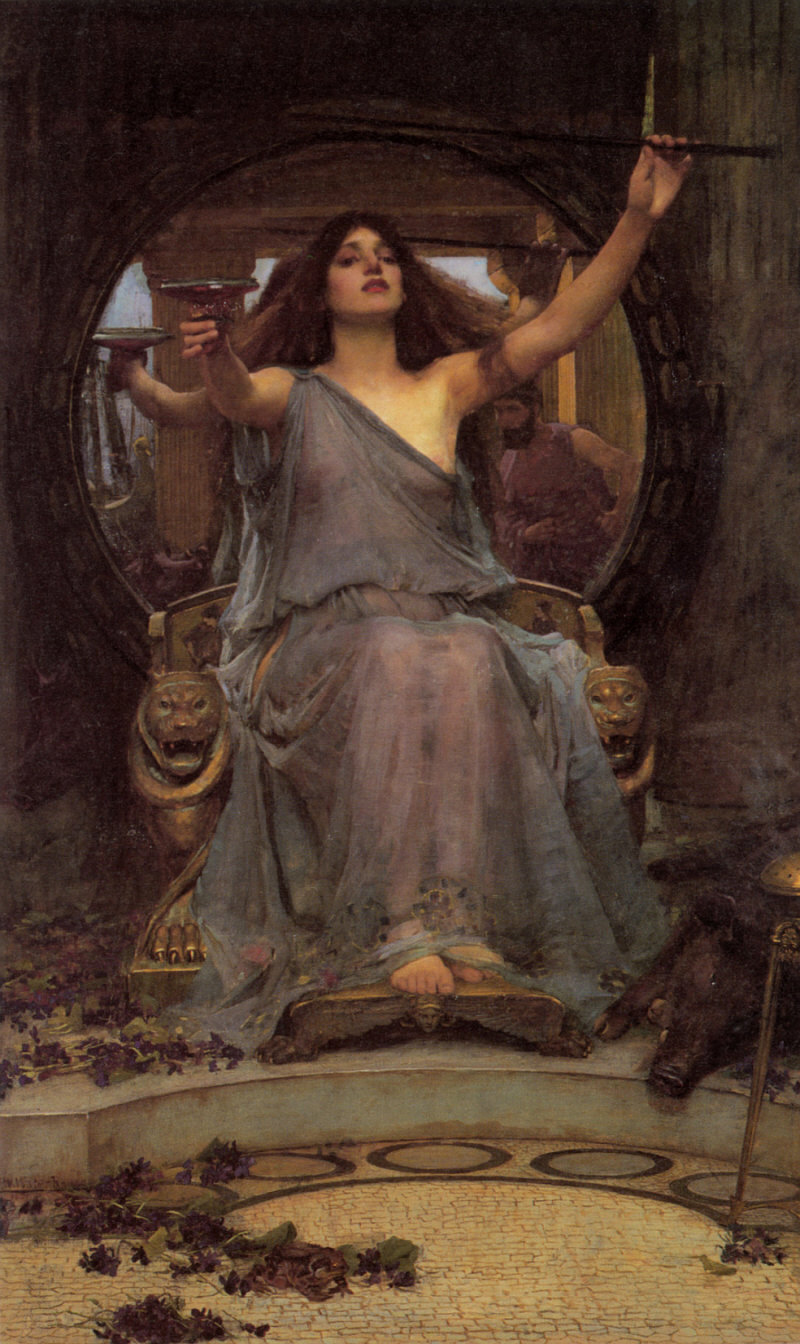
Circe Offering the Cup to Odysseus by John William Waterhouse, 1891: Galadriel's support of the Fellowship of the Ring has been compared to that of Circe and Calypso for Odysseus.

The Elf-queen Galadriel, Lady of Lothlórien, is the most powerful female character in Middle-earth during the Third Age. Tolkien portrays her as all-seeing, able to read people's thoughts. She uses this power to test the loyalty of each of the Fellowship in turn; David Craig, writing in Mallorn, comments that Tolkien would not have had a man do this, so it is "a gendered moment". She gives each of the nine members of the Fellowship of the Ring a personal gift, chosen to assist them with the quest to destroy the One Ring, and with their personal journeys, as with her gift to Sam the gardener of a box of earth to restore the fertility of his garden, the Shire.

Mac Fenwick compares Galadriel and what he sees as her monstrous opposite, the giant and evil spider Shelob, with the struggle between the good and the monstrous female characters in Homer's Odyssey. Like Galadriel, Circe and Calypso are rulers of their own secluded magical realms, and both offer help and advice to the protagonist. They help Odysseus to avoid destruction by the female monsters, the Sirens who would lure his ship on to the rocks, and Scylla and Charybdis who would smash or drown his ship; Galadriel gives Frodo the Phial of Galadriel, which by her power contains the captured light of Eärendil's star that shines in the darkness and is capable of blinding and warding off the threat of Shelob, an embodiment of darkness who is forever opposed to the light of the Elves. Galadriel's gifts, too, are Homeric, including cloaks, food, and wisdom as well as light, just like those of Circe and Calypso.

The scholar of English literature Maureen Thum describes Galadriel's masked power. She appears conventionally as a romantic medieval heroine in a garden, gives suitably medieval gifts, is admired from afar. But far from being imprisoned in her garden, she rules her realm and all who enter it "feel the power of the Lady". (Note: Tolkien 1954a, book 2 ch. 6 "Lothlórien") At the end of the book, the reader discovers that she is the bearer of Nenya, the Ring of Adamant, one of the three Elven-Rings, explaining her power to conceal and protect Lothlórien from the Dark Lord's gaze. Wayne G. Hammond and Christina Scull observe that "Adamant" means both a type of hard stone, and "stubbornly resolute", a description that well suits the quality of Galadriel's resistance to Sauron.

Scholars including Marjorie Burns and Sharin Schroeder have compared and contrasted Galadriel with Ayesha, the powerful and beautiful eponymous heroine of Rider Haggard's 1887 lost world adventure story She: A History of Adventure. Burns points out numerous similarities between Galadriel, Ayesha, and the Arthurian Lady of Shalott. Both scholars note however that whereas Ayesha overreaches her power and perishes on re-entering the immortal flame, Galadriel understands that she cannot wield the One Ring, though Frodo offers it to her freely. Galadriel, they write, helps the quest to destroy the Ring, and accepts the diminution of her power and the fading of her realm that result. Schroeder observes that where Ayesha is capricious, enjoying male admiration, Galadriel is serious, testing the members of the Fellowship for loyalty. Schroeder notes that Galadriel is self-aware, knowing that "she is as fallible as they are", and as much in need of testing: and indeed accepts Frodo's testing.

=== Éowyn ===
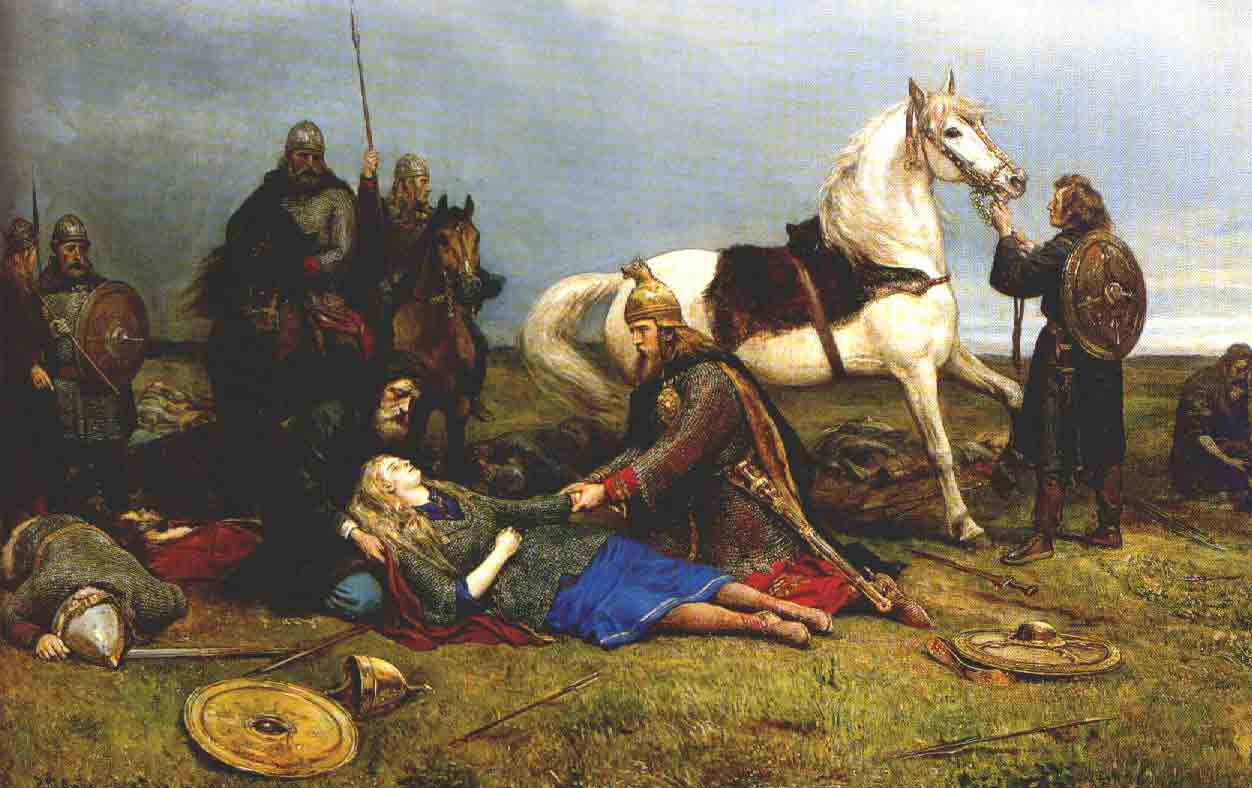
Éowyn's appearance on the Pelennor Fields has been compared to that of the shieldmaiden Hervor in the "Battle of the Goths and Huns", as depicted in Hervor's Death by Peter Nicolai Arbo.

Thum states that Éowyn wears in turn two masks, the first unconventional, the second conventional. She appears initially as a medieval romance heroine, a "woman clad in white", (Note: Tolkien 1954, book 3, ch. 6 "The King of the Golden Hall") standing silent and obedient behind King Théoden's throne. But soon it becomes clear that she is no meek subordinate, as "she looked on the king with cool pity in her eyes": she thinks for herself. Further, she appears conventionally beautiful as a romance lady: "Very fair was her face, and her long hair was like a river of gold." But, Thum writes, this too is swiftly gainsaid: "Slender and tall she was ... but strong she seemed and stern as steel, a daughter of kings." Éowyn's second mask is the appearance of a male Rider of Rohan, "Dernhelm", as, against orders, she rides to battle. (Note: Tolkien 1955, book 5, ch. 3 "The Muster of Rohan") In Old English dern means "secret, concealed", while helm is "helmet", a covering for the head. Thum comments that this unconventional mask conveys Éowyn's rebellious nature far more powerfully than would any overt account of her thinking.

Jessica Yates wrote that Éowyn meets all the requirements for a classic woman warrior: a strong identity; skill in fighting; weapons and armour; a horse; special powers, seen when she turns the Ringwraith's prophecy of doom back onto him; and being modest and chaste. Leibiger added that Éowyn is the only strong human female in The Lord of the Rings (Galadriel and Arwen being Elves), noting that her rejection of the woman's place in the home leads her to fulfil the prophecy about the leader of the Ringwraiths, the Witch-King of Angmar, that "not by the hand of man will [he] fall".

Melissa Hatcher wrote in Mythlore that The Lord of the Rings has as a central theme the way that "the littlest person, a hobbit, overcom[es] the tides of war": that the real power is that of healing, protecting, and preserving. She noted that Éowyn tries the path of the warrior and then becomes a healer, and that some academics have interpreted her choice as weak submission. Hatcher stated that instead, Éowyn is following Tolkien's "highest ideal: a fierce commitment to peace", embodying the "full-blooded subjectivity" that Tolkien believed necessary for peace. She described Éowyn as "a complete individual who fulfills Tolkien's theme of peace, preservation, and cultural memory."

Hatcher cited the philosopher Gregory Bassham's list of the six essential ingredients of happiness in Middle-earth, namely "delight in simple things, making light of one's troubles, getting personal, cultivating good character, cherishing and creating beauty, and rediscovering wonder", and stated that these are all seen in Éowyn and the Hobbit Sam, the gardener who inherits Frodo's Bag End and restores the Shire, "but in very few others".

=== Arwen ===
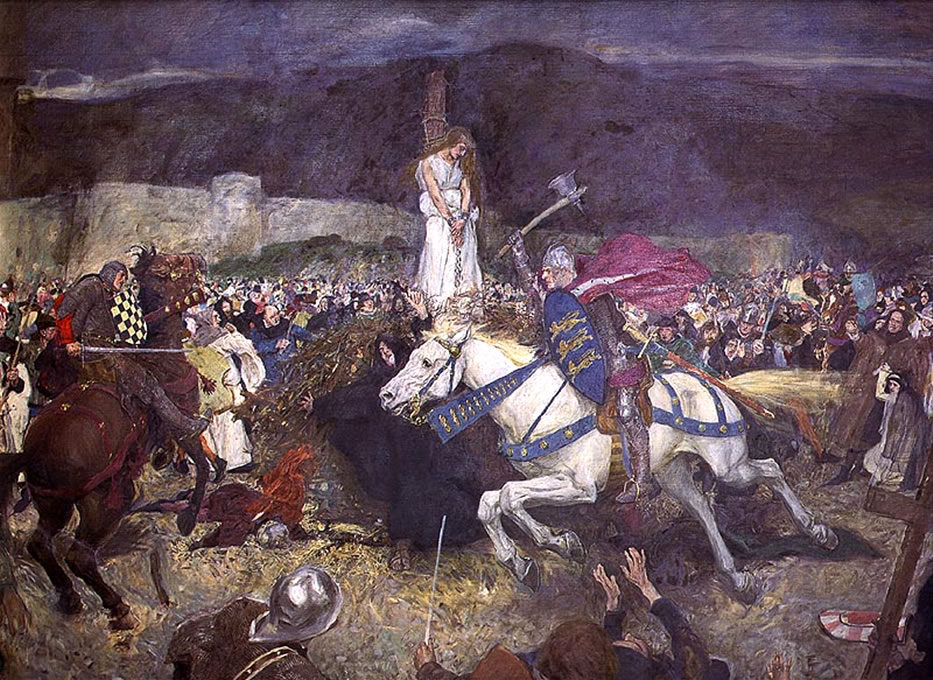
Arwen has been compared to a lady in medieval romance. The Rescue of Guinevere by William Hatherell, 1910.

Arwen is depicted as extremely beautiful; she is in Hatcher's view "a symbol of the unattainable, a perfect match for the unattainable Aragorn in Éowyn's eyes." Leibiger wrote that Arwen's lack of involvement follows the general Elvish pattern of retreating to safe havens already established in The Silmarillion and continued in The Lord of the Rings.

Enright wrote that Arwen, like Christ, is an immortal who voluntarily chooses mortality out of love, in her case for Aragorn. She granted that Arwen is not a conspicuous character, and unlike Éowyn does not ride into battle, but stated that her inner power is "subtly conveyed" and present throughout the novel.

The Tolkien scholar Verlyn Flieger wrote that the love of Arwen and Aragorn gives the hero his most definite romance characteristics. The relationship fits into the medieval romance tradition where the knight has "to endure hardships and perform great deeds for the love of a lady". She noted that Tolkien "buries [this] ... in his appendixes" for the reader to find "if he looks". Other than that, she wrote, there are just "a few scattered references in the story proper" to show that they are romantic lovers, but even those mostly do not so much as mention Arwen's name. For example, when Galadriel gives gifts to each of the Fellowship as they leave Lothlórien, she asks Aragorn what he would like. He replies "Lady, you know all my desire, and long held in keeping the only treasure [Arwen, Galadriel's granddaughter] that I seek. Yet it is not yours to give me, even if you would...." (Note: Tolkien 1954a, book 2 ch. 8 "Farewell to Lórien")

The fantasy and science fiction author Marion Zimmer Bradley wrote that the Hobbit Merry sees why Éowyn is part of the story while Arwen is not, "for Éowyn, too, achieves the passing of the 'Heroic Age'" when girls rebel against being women and "dream of male deeds".

The relationship between Aragorn and Arwen is made even more tender because of its origins. It, like the tale of Beren and Luthien, was written to be a reflection of Tolkien's own relationship with his wife, Edith. They were prevented from a relationship for a time, but when the time came they were reunited. He longed for her for years, and she gave up an engagement and her church to be with him, much like Aragorn had to wait to marry Arwen, and she gave up her immortality for him.

== Other women ==
=== Rosie Cotton ===
"Simple 'rustic' love": the portrayal of Rosie Cotton by Sarah McLeod in Peter Jackson's Lord of the Rings film trilogy helped to create an "explosion" of fan fiction about the character.

Tolkien wrote in a letter that "the simple 'rustic' love of Sam and his Rosie (nowhere elaborated) is absolutely essential [his italics] to the study of his (the chief hero's) character, and to the theme of the relation of ordinary life (breathing, eating, working, begetting) and quests, sacrifice, causes, and the 'longing for Elves', and sheer beauty." Megan N. Fontenot, writing in Tor.com, considered Rosie important as an emotional anchor for her would-be husband, and a real world anchor for readers. Echoing Tolkien's remarks, she wrote that their relatable relationship helped to make Aragorn and Arwen's idealised romance believable, and set it in context. Tolkien wrote about Rosie and Sam's eldest daughter, Elanor, within the book's Appendices, describing her uncommon Elf-like beauty and how she became a maid of honour to Queen Arwen. Elanor inherits the Red Book of Westmarch, an in-universe framing device, (Note: Tolkien 1954a, Prologue, "Note on the Shire Records") from Sam when he sails to Valinor after his wife's death.

Amy Sturgis describes in Mythlore how Rosie is reimagined by female fans, somehow keeping up with the "daunting" competition "from the regal Galadriel and courageous Eowyn to the exotic Arwen and commanding Melian", in response to the character's "incomplete literary portrait" by Tolkien. She becomes in their fan fiction variously "the paragon of the hearth, the iconoclast of the bedroom, or the agent of the supernatural", reflecting "contemporary taste for a three-dimensional, complex heroine at center stage". Sturgis comments that the "explosion" in Rosie's fan fiction surely depended both on the Internet and on Peter Jackson's Lord of the Rings film trilogy, where Rosie was played by Sarah McLeod.

=== Lobelia Sackville-Baggins ===
While Tolkien wrote to Allen and Unwin that Lobelia Sackville-Baggins was modelled on an elderly lady he knew, commentators have suggested that she is an unfavourable caricature of Vita Sackville-West, an aristocratic novelist and gardening columnist in Tolkien's time. The journalist Matthew Dennison called Lobelia a memorable comic relief character whose name resembled Sackville-West's, while her frustrated attempts to secure Bag End mirrored Sackville-West's unsatisfied longing to inherit her family home, Knole House. The Tolkien scholar Tom Shippey observes that the socially-aspiring Sackville-Bagginses have attempted to "Frenchify" their family name, Sac[k]-ville meaning "Bag Town", as a mark of their bourgeois status. Fontenot drew attention to Lobelia's substantial character development in spite of her minor importance: she contrasted her initially unsympathetic characterisation to her courageous defiance against Sharkey's thugs during The Scouring of the Shire armed with only an umbrella, and her generosity in helping displaced Shire-folk. Fontenot stated that Lobelia was "a compelling character in her own right", an "unexpected hero" whose story serves as a reminder that even the most irritable or contemptuous individuals may have redeeming qualities.

=== Ioreth ===
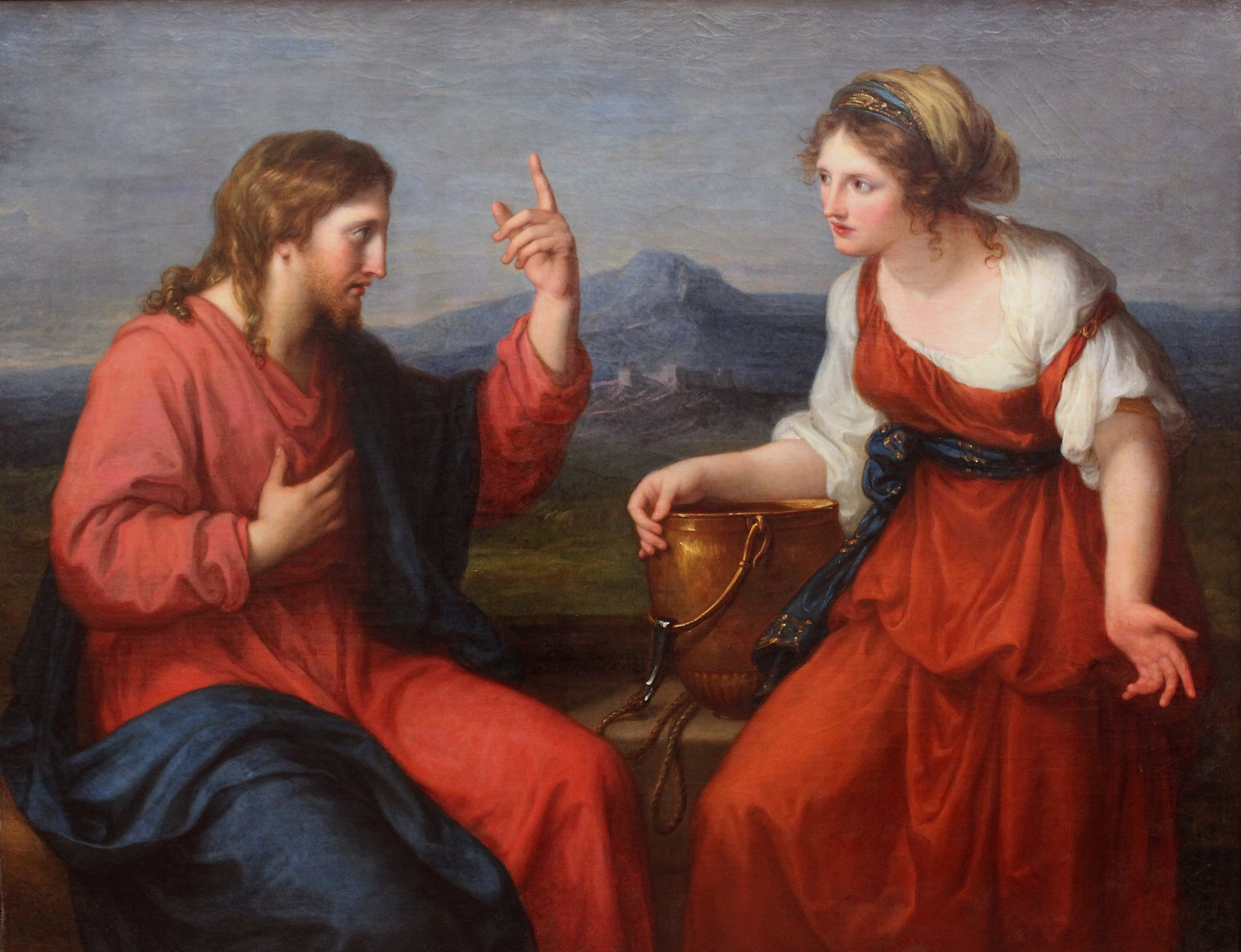
Ioreth, who triggers the acclamation of Aragorn as King, has been likened to the Samaritan woman at the well who recognised Jesus as the Christ. Painting by Angelika Kauffmann, 1796

Ioreth is a talkative wise-woman who works as a healer at the Houses of Healing in Minas Tirith. The Wizard Gandalf learns from her that "the hands of the king are the hands of a healer", which inspires him to persuade Aragorn to tend to the wounded survivors of the Battle of the Pelennor Fields, in the process defining Aragorn's power and publicly proving his birthright as the rightful claimant to the kingdom's vacant throne. Rutledge compared Ioreth's announcing role to three Biblical women: Anna the Prophetess who is "looking for the redemption of Jerusalem", and who lets Jerusalem know about the infant Jesus; Naaman's Israelite slave girl, who tells her mistress that the prophet Elisha can heal; and the Samaritan woman at the well, who says "Can this be the Christ?" Rutledge ascribes a second role to Ioreth when the war is over: she shows, through her amusingly depicted ordinariness, how current events turn first into lore, stories that get repeated and shared, and eventually into epic, part of Tolkien's construction of a body of myth, legend, and stories supposed to be about the distant past of the real world. Tolkien has presented the story of The War of the Ring from the point of view of the Hobbits. Now, back in the city, the Ring destroyed, and Sauron defeated, readers hear Ioreth, "no longer a towering Old Testament prophetess but an amusing goodwife full of words", explaining everything to her country relative. Sam has become "an esquire"; the other Hobbits are in Ioreth's words "princes of great fame"; Frodo is already a legend, though his personal reality is very different. The reader is back at the level of ordinary folk, and Ioreth is part of a narrative that illuminates how stories develop.

=== Gilraen ===
Gilraen, Aragorn's mother, is briefly mentioned by Tolkien, speaking a sad linnod of her loss of hope for herself, though she has given the world her son Aragorn, who is also named Estel, "Hope". (Note: Tolkien 1955 Appendix A "The Númenórean Kings") Kate Madison's 2009 fan film Born of Hope grows from this small hint. The film imagines a time in the life of Aragorn's parents, Gilraen and Arathorn. Madison plays a non-canonical character, Elgarain, who has a passion for her friend-in-arms Arathorn, which she keeps hidden as he is already with Gilraen. Orcs attack the village as Arathorn and Gilraen are deciding how to keep the infant Aragorn safe. Elgarain is mortally wounded fighting off the orcs from Gilraen's hut.

== In film ==
The Tolkien scholar Tom Shippey remarks the appearance of a love triangle in this poster for The Two Towers film, unlike in the book.

Shippey comments that the leading women may have seemed insufficiently prominent to some of those responsible for marketing Peter Jackson's The Lord of the Rings film trilogy. He noted that a publicity shot for The Two Towers depicted Viggo Mortensen as Aragorn with upheld sword in the centre, with Arwen and Éowyn on either side to give the impression of a love triangle. He commented that to do that, "pretty drastic" changes were required, not least because Tolkien has Éowyn only speak 42 words in The Two Towers, of which just 5 are to Aragorn; whereas in the film, Éowyn appears in 14 out of 62 scenes. Similarly, he notes, Arwen does not speak at all in Tolkien's The Two Towers, whereas she features "prominently" in 3 scenes in the film. To achieve this, the film uses material on Arwen from Appendix 5, while for Éowyn, Shippey states, some of Gandalf's dialogue is given to Grima Wormtongue so that Éowyn can appear directly.

The Tolkien scholar Janet Brennan Croft writes that in the book, Arwen is "never a temptress" or obstacle, she is "an inspiration and a source of strength", while when Éowyn presents a temptation, "his unquestioned commitment to and faith in his relationship with Arwen helps him pass the test". In contrast, she writes, Jackson's Aragorn "reacts to both women ... as at least distractions if not outright temptresses". She notes that in the film, Aragorn tries to reject Arwen's pendant, though she says it is hers to give, and he is "even rather harsh towards Éowyn's infatuation", where Tolkien has him speaking "with great delicacy of care for her feelings".

The scholar of literature Maureen Thum comments more positively that Jackson presents "a vivid picture" of the story's three powerful women, their visual importance matching their "unusually high significance in a novel ... dominated ... by men". Thum writes that Jackson "stresses what Tolkien implies" by portraying Éowyn's feelings for Aragorn and her skill in battle. She finds the invented scenes for Arwen appropriate in reflecting Arwen's significance. She considers that Jackson has not changed Tolkien's portrait of Galadriel, other than to emphasise the power that Tolkien mentions that she has. In Thum's view, although his reworking of the three characters often departs radically from Tolkien's text, he accurately represents Tolkien's view of women.
