= Christopher Nolan's interpretation of the Odyssey =

Film analysis

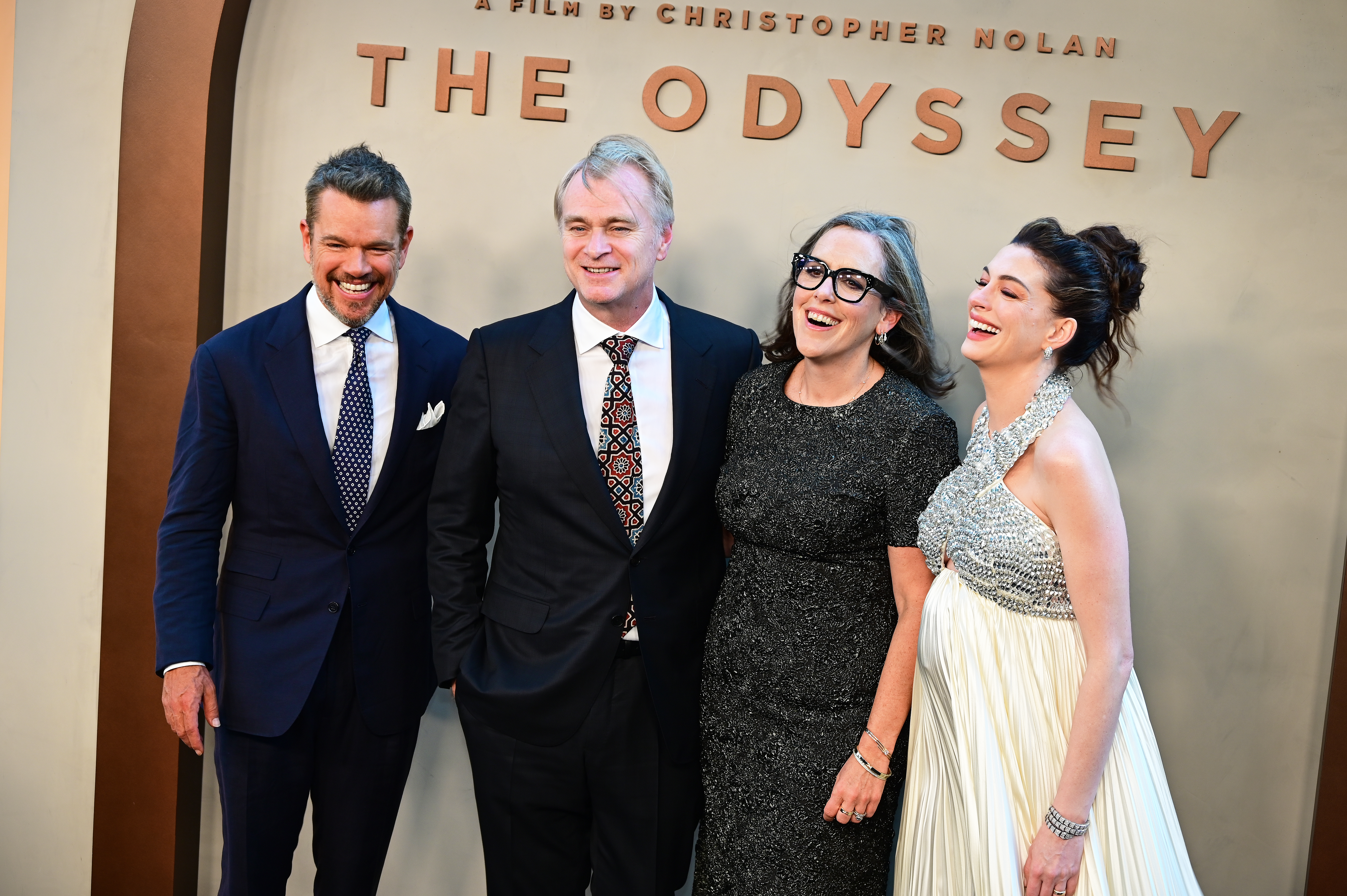
The actor Matt Damon, the director Christopher Nolan, the producer Emma Thomas, and the actor Anne Hathaway at The Odyssey's premiere in New York City

Homer's epic poem the Odyssey was written in Greek around the 8th or 7th century BC. In 2026, Christopher Nolan brought out his action film The Odyssey, adapted from the poem. Critics have noted multiple differences between the versions. Some have questioned whether Nolan accurately depicts Mycenaean Greece; others have argued that Homer's epic was simply a myth, and others again have stated that while the Odyssey is a story, it was rooted in history. The film has been described as both the "most anticipated" and the "most contested" of 2026.

The process of adapting an ancient book-length poem to a single 172-minute film makes changes and omissions inevitable. Nolan cut some plot elements and characters, including several gods, while attempting to preserve an "appropriate tone". He decided to portray Odysseus as a veteran tired of war and haunted by slaughter. That offers a modern explanation for the length of Odysseus's homecoming—that he was avoiding going home. The historian Andrew E. Larsen admired the film's look, but considered the Greek costumes unhistorically drab, and found Agamemnon's armour silly. The classicist Armand D'Angour liked the use of an ancient musical instrument, the aulos. Others critiqued the armour and ship designs. Some critics argued that the adaptation reshaped the poem's ancient moral framework to align with modern attitudes. The casting of the Kenyan-Mexican actress Lupita Nyong'o as Helen of Troy was criticised by conservative American commentators as blackwashing. Several commentators called this criticism racist. Larsen commented that Greek literature accepted the princess Andromeda of Ethiopia, who is "explicitly Black", as extremely beautiful.

The English classicist Mary Beard criticised the film as "an Odyssey without the sex" or the humour of the original. She called the character dynamics "feebly handled", and said that the adaptation failed to capture the nuances of Homer's text. The American classicist Emily Wilson, whose 2017 translation inspired Nolan, called the result a simple action film lacking "psychological, emotional, political and ethical depth", abysmally written, and with "nothing convincing to say" about the Odyssey's major themes.

Others argued that Nolan's film succeeds on its own terms, creating a popular film matching the expectations of a modern audience. The British critic Peter Bradshaw praised the film's ambition and scope, offering a vision of grim resolution in the face of loss. Guy Lodge of Variety described it as a "vast, thrilling, slightly aloof epic", offering the audience so much that the chilliness works.

== Context ==
Homer's epic poem the Odyssey is one of the oldest surviving works of literature, written in Greek around the 8th or 7th century BC. In 2026, Christopher Nolan brought out his action film The Odyssey, adapted from Homer's poem. Scholars and critics have noted multiple differences between Nolan's and Homer's versions. Some have questioned whether Nolan accurately depicts Mycenaean Greece; others have argued that Homer's epic was simply a myth, while others again have stated that while the Odyssey is a story, it was rooted in history. The film has been described as both the "most anticipated" and the "most contested" of 2026.

== Adaptation and omission ==
Emily Wilson's translation may have inspired Nolan to make Odysseus a war-anguished veteran.

The process of adapting an ancient book-length poem (whose audiobook is over 10 hours long) to a single 172-minute film suitable for a modern audience means that changes and omissions are inevitable. Among the omissions are several of the gods; princess Nausicaa and the Phaeacians; Odysseus talking to the Cyclops and cunningly calling himself 'Nobody'; Telemachus's hanging of the disloyal women; and Penelope's testing of the returning Odysseus, getting him to describe their marital bed (he had made it of olive wood). Chris Montanelli, on Scraps from the Loft, writes that the absence of the gods who provide Homer's plot line "carries a precise narrative cost", namely that "the wanderings [of Odysseus] lose their logic of [divine] persecution and become a string of accidents." A deeper cost, Montanelli argues, is that the gods' absence destroys the story's distance in time: instead, The Odyssey makes classical antiquity "psychologically our contemporary."

Nolan merged some plot elements and dropped some characters, including several of the gods, while attempting to preserve an "appropriate tone". A major change is Nolan's decision to portray Odysseus as a veteran tired of war and haunted by the slaughter that his Trojan Horse caused. That mental anguish offers viewers a modern explanation for the length of Odysseus's homecoming, namely that he was avoiding going home. Erica Gonzales suggests in Elle magazine that this was "inspired by the opening line of the classicist Emily Wilson's 2017 translation of The Odyssey, which Nolan himself cited as an influence: 'Tell me about a complicated man.'"

== Aspects of the film ==
=== Historical appropriateness ===
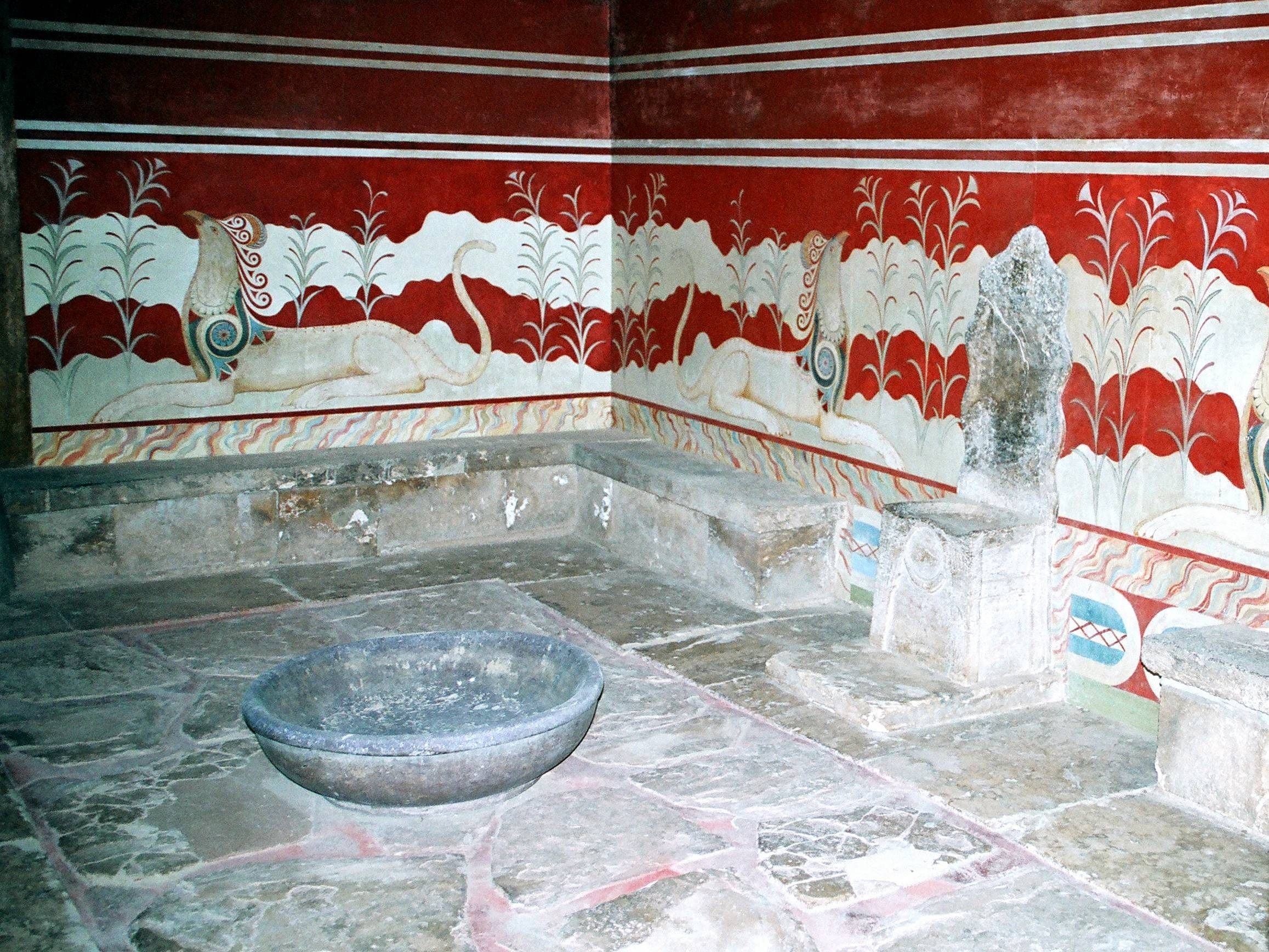
Andrew E. Larsen found it appropriate that Nolan used the royal throne at Knossos for Odysseus's throne in Ithaca.

The historian Andrew E. Larsen wrote that he had diverse reactions to the film's elements. He found the film "visually striking", particularly liking the Trojan Horse, while the use of the Minoan throne from Knossos for the Ithaca throne was a guess, but "a really nice touch". He noted that Odysseus's ship is a replica Viking longship, not a Mycenean vessel, but commented that it was a reasonable match with what little is known of such ships. On the other hand, he considered the Greek costumes excessively drab, "generally unlike what Greeks actually wore." He found Agamemnon's armour especially silly, resembling a Batman cosplay.

The classicist Armand D'Angour wrote that the film's music appropriately includes the sound of an ancient musical instrument, the double pipes of the aulos, woven into the otherwise "heroic and percussive" non-diegetic background score.

Some Greek publications, historians, and other commenters criticised the filmmakers for not casting any Greek or Greek-American actors, as well as criticizing the armour and ship designs. Some commentators called these changes "unrealistic" for the period depicted and a misrepresentation of ancient Greek history, which could "break the immersion" and "detract from important aspects of the story". Nolan acknowledged concerns about the historical accuracy, comparing his approach to that of his 2014 film Interstellar as an exploration of "what is the best speculation and how can I use that to create a world?" /Film's Jeremy Mathai declared that "practically every major criticism of The Odyssey is selective and hypocritical to the extreme". John Semley at Wired characterised the controversies as part of a broader "culture war" response to diverse casting, similar to reactions to Wilson's translation of the Odyssey.

=== Moral framework ===
Some critics argued that the adaptation reshaped the poem's ancient moral framework to align with modern attitudes. In The New Yorker, Richard Brody wrote that its guilt-ridden Odysseus gave the story a "readily digestible modernity" and sought to "redeem Odysseus for modern times"; he contrasted this portrayal with the Cicones episode in Book 9, in which Odysseus matter-of-factly recounts sacking a town, killing its men, and dividing the captured women and wealth among his crews. Montanelli remarks the film's chasteness: Circe and Calypso barely hint at sex with Odysseus, and with that loss "goes half the character's ambiguity — the husband jealous of another's fidelity and generous with his own."

The British classicist Emily Hauser argued in The Guardian that Homer's Odysseus is "not a straightforwardly moral modern leader", noting that the film omits the act of hubris that brings Poseidon's curse, arms the suitors whom Odysseus kills, alters the execution of the enslaved women, and adds a remorseful final journey absent from the poem.

=== Casting choices ===
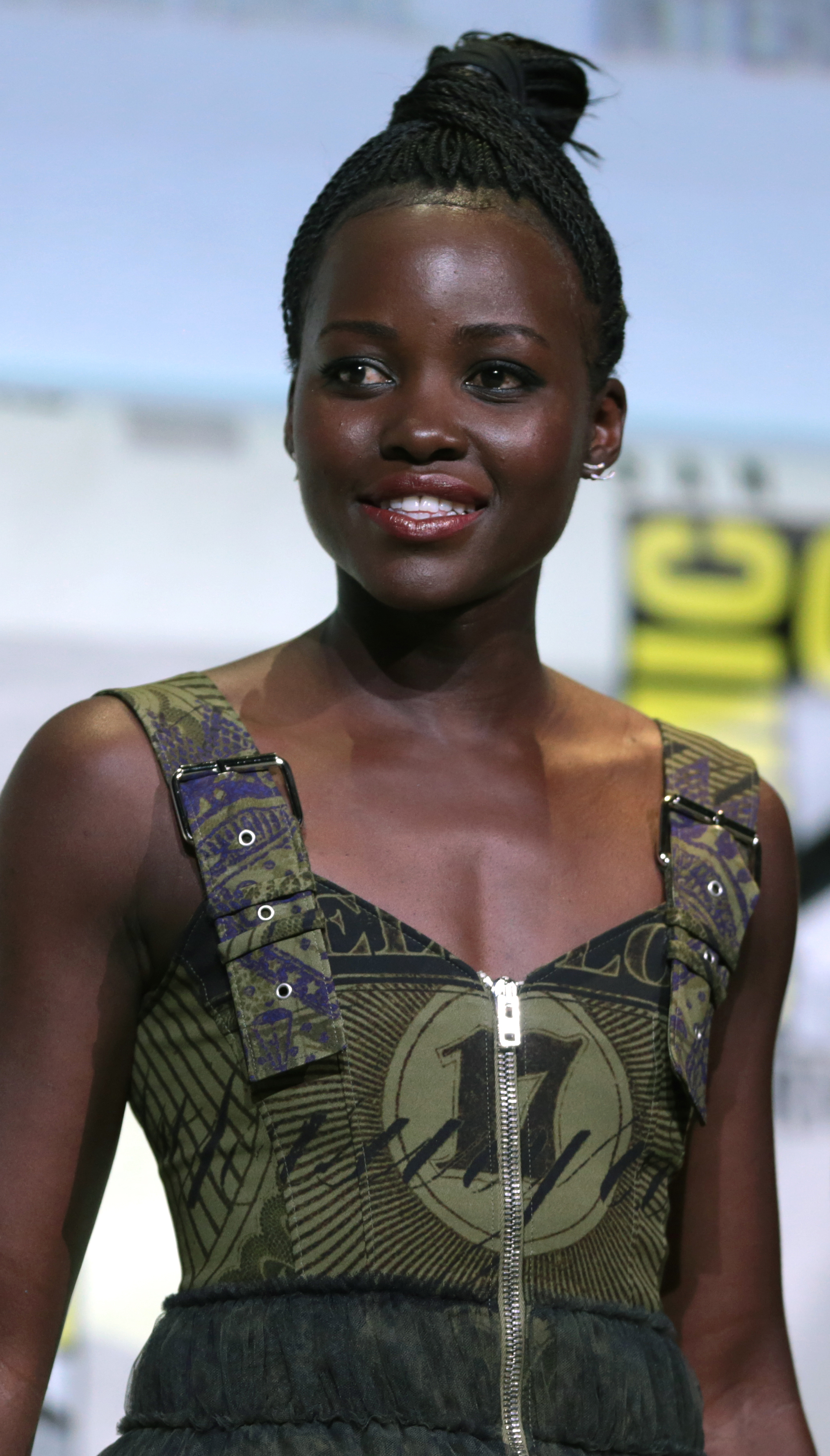
The casting of Lupita Nyong'o as Helen of Troy was criticised by conservative American commentators.

The casting of the Kenyan-Mexican actress Lupita Nyong'o as Helen of Troy, who had been described as the most beautiful woman in the world, was criticised by conservative American commentators, such as Matt Walsh and Elon Musk, as blackwashing. Several commentators called this criticism racist, comparing it to similar casting criticisms of the 2023 docudrama Queen Cleopatra and that same year's Disney film The Little Mermaid. Referencing Greek professor Dimitris Liantinis, Philip Chrysopoulos of the Greek Reporter acknowledged that Homer described Helen as pale or "white-armed" but noted that he did not describe her in detail, allowing everyone to imagine her for themselves. Larsen commented that Greeks of the time "generally weren't light-skinned", and that the princess Andromeda of Ethiopia, who is "explicitly Black", was described as extremely beautiful. Salon's C. K. Smith opined that the backlash over the supposed inaccuracy of her depiction was "selective" and more about social issues over minority representation than about fidelity to the source material. Meanwhile, Nolan defended Nyong'o's casting, saying he believed the actress conveyed the "strength and the poise" he found essential for the role. Nyong'o opted to emphasise who Helen was beyond her appearance, stating, "You can't perform beauty". She added that the cast was meant to be "representative of the world" while "occupying the epic narrative of our time". Writing for The Guardian, Greek film critic Chris Cotonou called this an "honourable intention", but argued that it made the absence of Greek actors "even more glaring", as they are the people "most authentically connected to the source".

=== Costumes and ships ===
Agamemnon's thick dark armour was criticised as unhistorical and likened to the contemporary Batsuit worn by Bruce Wayne / Batman in Nolan's Dark Knight trilogy (2005–2012). Military historian Bret Devereaux said that iron armour did not exist in Greece during the late Bronze Age, the commonly believed setting of the Odyssey. However, he said that Homeric characters had been "depicted in anachronistic armour since antiquity" and were portrayed as contemporary warriors in the late Archaic or Classical periods. He said the armour was "vaguely Greek-looking" but did not represent any specific type of armour. Caleb Howells at the Greek Reporter acknowledged that, while the armour designs were reminiscent of the Archaic-era armour described by Homer, they still had some "prominent inaccuracies". The design and dark colour of the galleys were noted for more closely resembling Viking longships rather than the Ancient Greek ships used during the Trojan War. Conversely, the popular historian Tom Holland (unrelated to the actor) said that there was no historically accurate interpretation of Odysseus because he is a mythical figure, opining that an "impressionist" interpretation of ancient history was an improvement over a "painstaking attempt to get every historical detail right, because it's impossible". Chris Garlick, manager at period costume company Cosprop, said "We have the expertise to do things accurately, but we are aware that directors and producers want to push things in a slightly different direction".

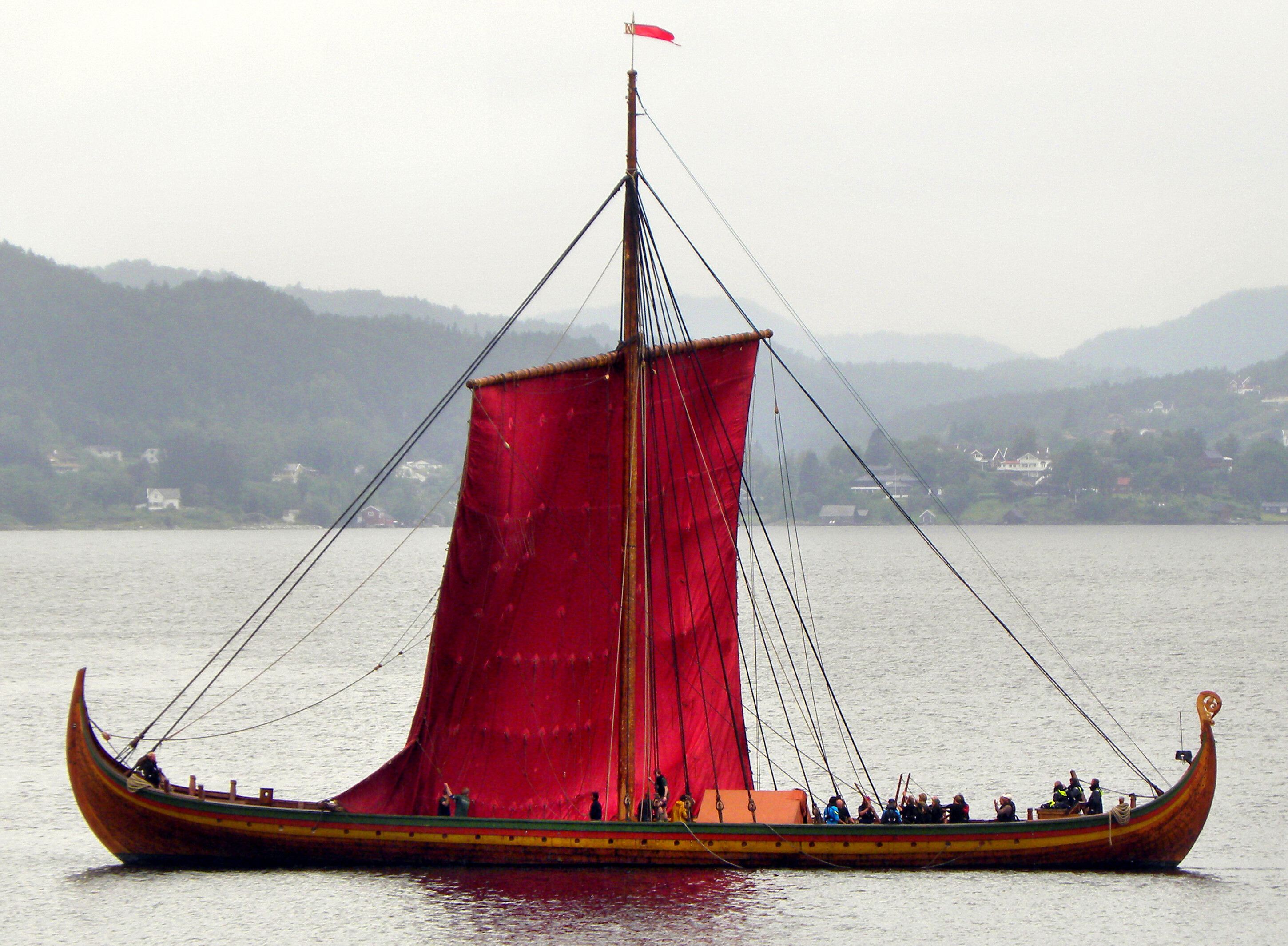
A Viking longship was used in place of a Mycenaean ship.

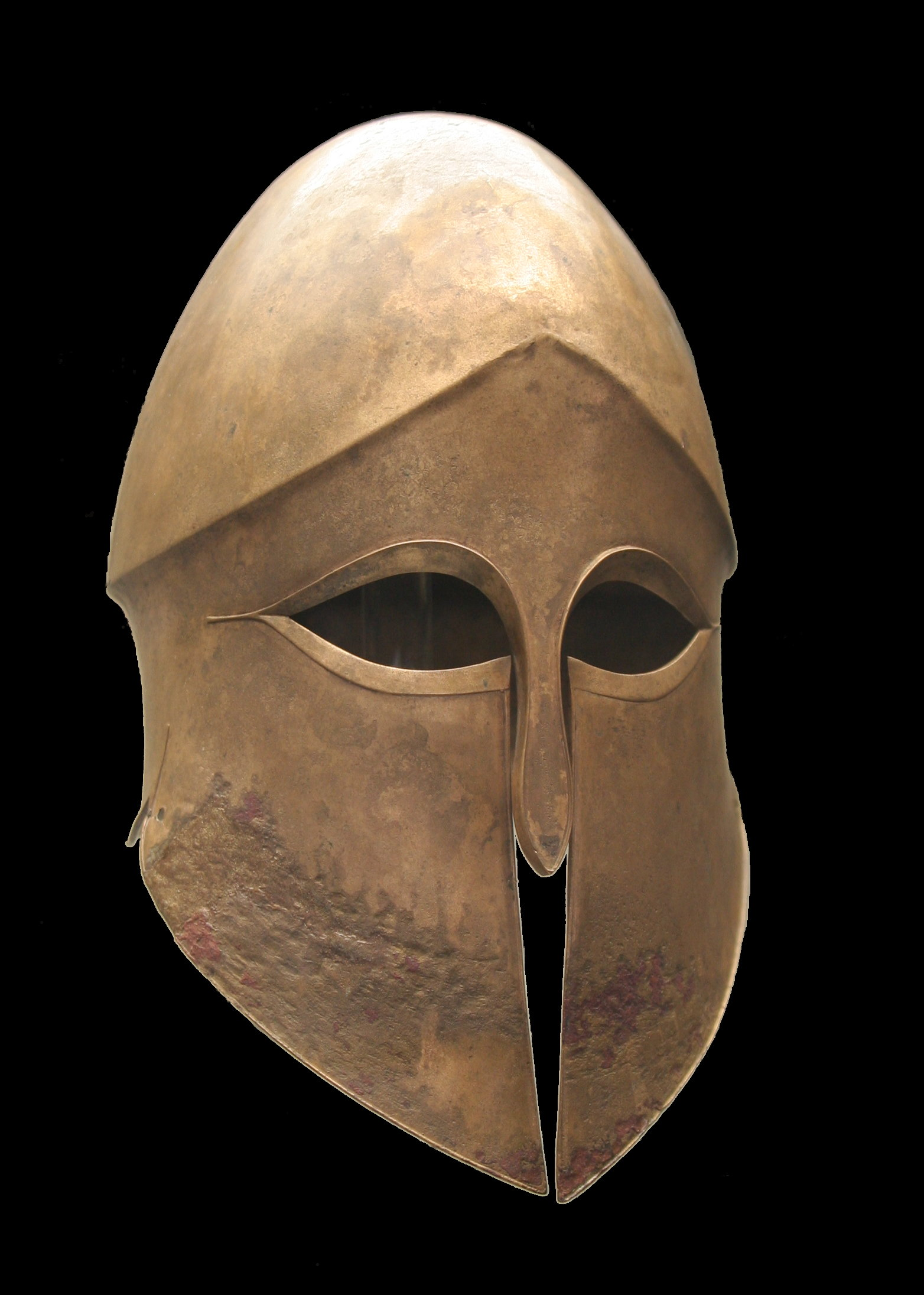
A Corinthian helmet was used in place of a helmet from the time of the Trojan War.

=== Linguistic register ===
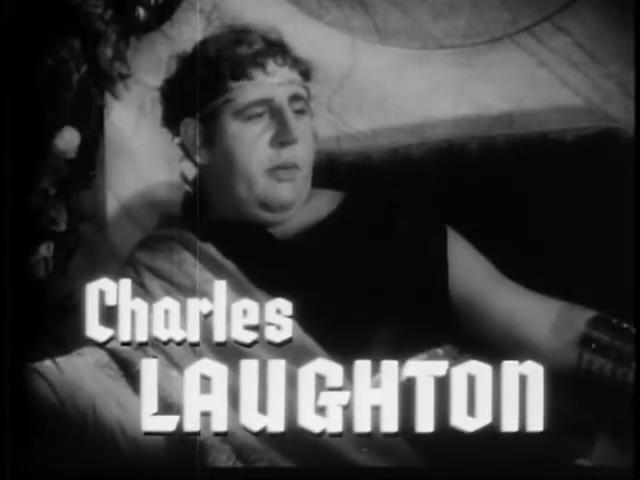
Hollywood films have long had the convention of Queen's Latin, where actors playing classical roles (such as Charles Laughton as the Emperor Nero in Cecil B. DeMille's 1932 The Sign of the Cross) have had British accents. Nolan ignored this in The Odyssey.

The use of American accents and 21st century American English dialogue from the cast, including British actors Holland and Pattinson, was criticised. James Hibberd of The Hollywood Reporter called this decision a "striking departure from the unwritten Hollywood rule of characters in historical epics employing British accents". Hibberd and Nell Geraets at The Sydney Morning Herald contended that using ancient Greek dialects would not be accessible for contemporary audiences, unlike an American accent. This change was perceived as anachronistic for an adaptation of ancient Greek literature, with Geraets noting neither British nor American accents were linguistically authentic to the ancient Greek setting, while Hibberd said using American accents "risks sounding a bit silly at times", unlike the "'just foreign enough'" modern British accent. Nolan insisted that the cast should use American accents rather than British or Greek, which IGN's Scott Collura defended, noting that Wilson's translation of the poem similarly translated the text into plain English, quoting her rationale "Translation always, necessarily, involves interpretation." The accents and everyday language dialogue were mocked by some online commenters. Antinous's use of the word "daddy" to Telemachus has been thought especially inappropriate in tone. Nolan stated that he wanted "language that has emotional not intellectual meaning to people", realising that some people might not like that.

=== Retaining the qualities of Homer's poem ===
Richard Brody of The New Yorker felt that Nolan "turns an epic poem prosaic". Odie Henderson of The Boston Globe wrote that like the 1963 film Cleopatra, The Odyssey takes itself too seriously. The film ultimately sinks under its bleakness like a lead balloon."

The English classicist Mary Beard offered a mixed critique, praising the film's scale while criticising it as "an Odyssey without the sex" and lacking the "elusive sexiness" and humour of the original poem. Writing for The Times and discussing it on The Guardian's podcast, she labelled the character dynamics as "feebly handled", specifically citing the removal of key female figures like Queen Arete and Princess Nausicaa. Having previously maintained that "no film has ever cracked The Odyssey", Beard argued the adaptation failed to capture the complex, nuanced nature of Homer's text.

== Perceived degrees of success ==
=== Falling short of Homer ===
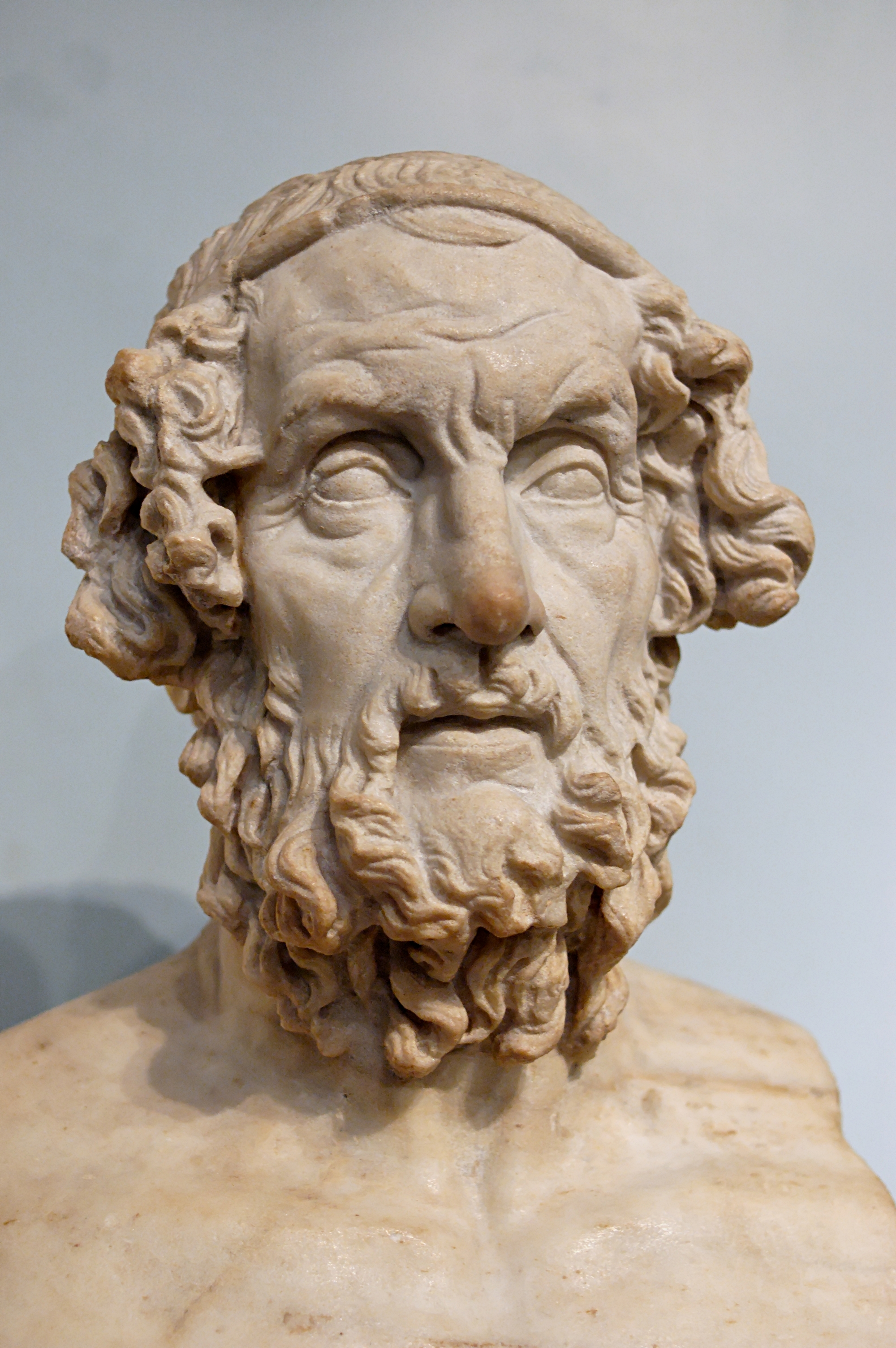
Marble bust of Homer. Roman copy of Hellenistic Greek original.

Some critics have argued that the film falls short of Homer's poem. Larsen wrote that there were many fine performances "within the limits of the script". Wilson, whose 2017 translation was one of Nolan's sources of inspiration, described The Odyssey as a "gratifying" boost for Homeric interest, but that it failed to deliver on the "complicated man" premise she had provided. She called it a simple action film, like a "traumatized Jason Bourne". In her view, it lacked "psychological, emotional, political and ethical depth"; the writing was "abysmal"; and it had "nothing convincing to say" about the Odyssey's major themes.

The novelist Joyce Carol Oates criticised the tone of Wilson's review, arguing that she should have approached Nolan's interpretation more thoughtfully and respectfully. The author Susan Orlean similarly objected to Wilson, arguing that adaptations that differ from their source material should be regarded as their own works.

Montanelli admired the cinematography, the physically depicted monsters, and the sound of the "chanting chorus". But in his view, these aspects were outweighed in "a project that distrusts its own material: the gods evicted, the ritual ferocity reduced to surgical sacrifices and single tears, the ambiguous hero rewritten as a veteran seeking forgiveness, the enchantresses promoted to moralists." In Montanelli's opinion, the film had unfortunately chosen to provide explanations where Homer let his audience feel disturbed, and to offer motives where Homer just gave a plain account. The film seemed to be a moral prequel to Nolan's Oppenheimer, "another parable of a genius whose invention brings down a world."

=== Succeeding as a film ===
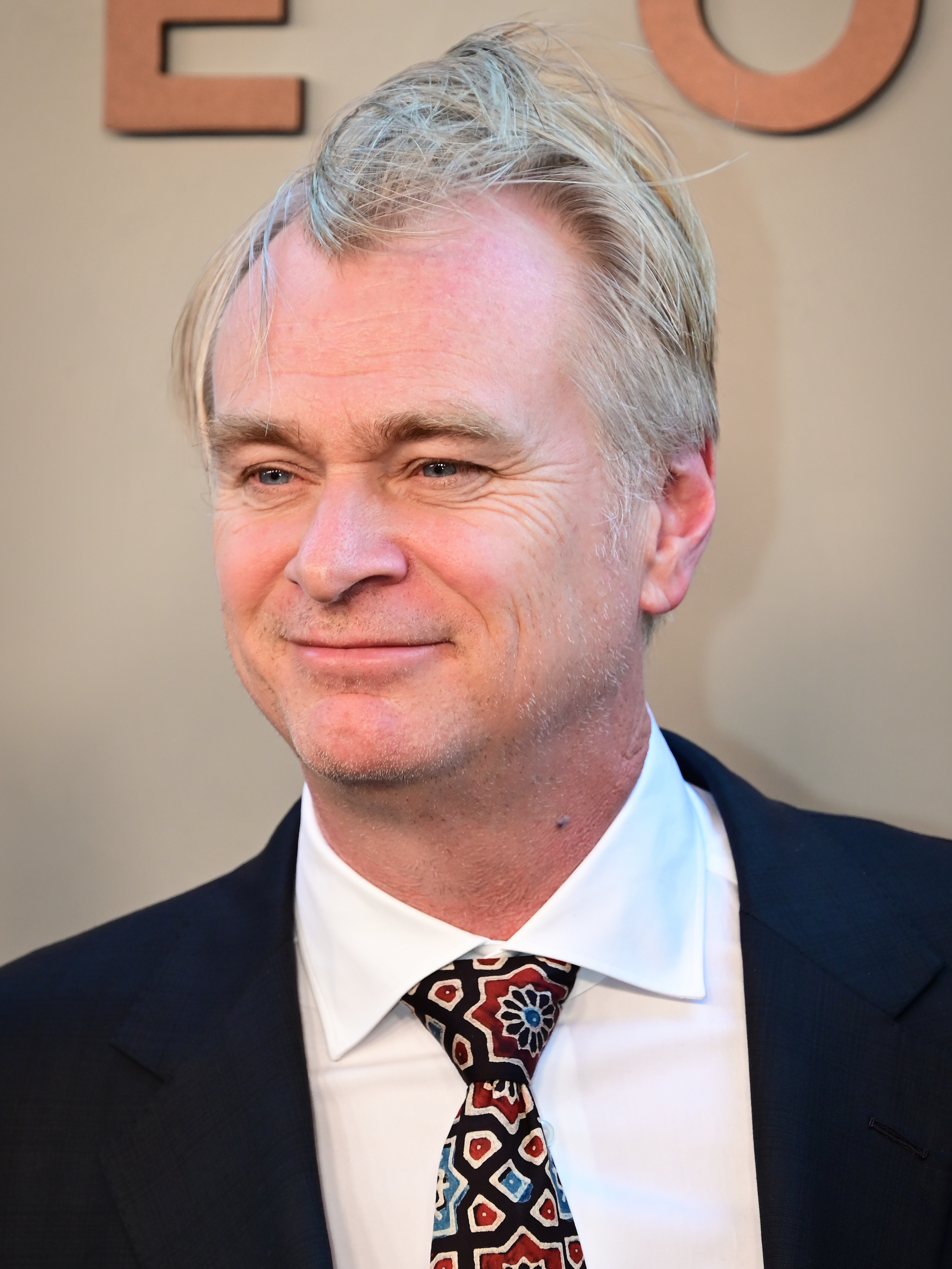
Christopher Nolan

Others argued that Nolan's film succeeds on its own terms. Hauser concluded that Nolan had changed the story into a tale of a troubled, empathic Odysseus and a reluctant hero, achieving both what he had intended as a director, and creating "a box-office smash with stunning visual action, epic proportions and a hero" such as its modern audience would like. D'Angour wrote that the film's audience "has been reared on fantasy, horror, and gory battle sequences, not on ancient Greek literature and sophisticated narrative structures", and that in these terms it is "spectacular" and "a lot of fun".

The British film critic Peter Bradshaw called The Odyssey "a film with thrilling ambition, boldness, seriousness, generosity and flair". In his view, Nolan succeeded in creating "a gigantic, shimmering mirage, a mysterious three-hour vision of crazy episodes that does not yield up wisdom or contentment, but only a grim resolution to continue with the fight, to make sense of ruined lives, to re-enter the scorched battlefield of loss."

Amy Nicholson of the Los Angeles Times called the film "a mighty Trojan horse of [Nolan]'s thematic obsessions", writing that Nolan "refuses to tremble before the canon ... He cuts and rejiggers Homer and a bit of Virgil to transform the classical texts into his type of tale: one fixated on memory, self-identity, destructive genius and the slippage of time."

Guy Lodge of Variety described it as a "vast, thrilling, slightly aloof epic", and concluded, "There's so much to feel here at a sensory level that the film gets away with its slightly aloof, soul-skirting chill; we leave it feeling that we've been to hell and back, and exhilaratingly so."

== See also ==
- Peter Jackson's interpretation of The Lord of the Rings – another director's take on a major book
