= Peter Jackson's interpretation of The Lord of the Rings =

Analysis of 2001–2003 Tolkien films

Commentators have compared Peter Jackson's 2001–2003 The Lord of the Rings film trilogy with the book on which it was based, J. R. R. Tolkien's 1954–1955 The Lord of the Rings, remarking that while both have been extremely successful commercially, the film version does not necessarily capture the intended meaning of the book. They have admired Jackson's ability to film the long and complex work at all; the beauty of the cinematography, sets, and costumes; the quality of the music; and the epic scale of his version of Tolkien's story. They have, however, found the characters and the story greatly weakened by Jackson's emphasis on action and violence at the expense of psychological depth; the loss of Tolkien's emphasis on free will and individual responsibility; the flattening out of Tolkien's balanced treatment of evil to a simple equation of the One Ring with evil; and the replacement of Frodo's inner journey by an American "hero's journey" or monomyth with Aragorn as the hero.

Commentators have admired the simultaneous use of images, words, and music to convey emotion, evoking the appearance of Middle-earth, creating wonderfully believable creatures, and honouring Tolkien's Catholic vision with images that can work also for non-Christians.

Fans, actors, critics, and scholars have seen Jackson's version as a success: on its own terms, as an adaptation of Tolkien, and as going beyond Tolkien into a sort of modern folklore. The development of fan films such as Born of Hope and The Hunt for Gollum, and of a modern folklore with characters such as elves, dwarves, wizards, and halflings, all derived from Jackson's rendering of Tolkien, have been viewed as measures of this success.

== Context ==
Both book and film versions of The Lord of the Rings have been extremely successful, enjoyed by the public and non-academic reviewers alike, and attracting scholarly attention to the differences between them.

=== Tolkien's fantasy novel ===
J. R. R. Tolkien's fantasy novel The Lord of the Rings was published in three volumes in 1954–1955 and has sold over 150 million copies. It has been translated into at least 58 languages. It takes up, according to the edition, around 1000 pages of text. Read out loud in the unabridged audiobook voiced by Rob Inglis, it has a running time of nearly 60 hours.

=== Tolkien's views on film adaptations ===
Tolkien did not live to see Jackson's film version, but he did engage in dialogue with a film-maker interested in adapting Middle-earth for the cinema. Tolkien was involved in a proposal by Forrest J. Ackerman in the 1950s to make an animated film adaptation by Morton Grady Zimmerman. He was not opposed to the idea: in 1957 he wrote that an abridgement "with some good picture-work would be pleasant". He felt that selective omission would be better than compression; in the script he was shown, he found the compression excessive, with "resultant over-crowding and confusion, blurring of climaxes, and general degradation". Thus, the French Tolkien scholar Vincent Ferré notes, Tolkien was not opposed to "any adaptation", but specifically to the Zimmerman script. He liked the images of deserts and mountains that he saw, as they seemed to him appropriate for Middle-earth. Further, he wrote that scenery and sets might be a core element of the proposed film. When he disliked a part of the script, he thought out suitable cinematic images that might give the viewer an idea of the quest's challenges, or having a fire to provide suitable lighting for the conflict with the Nazgûl on Weathertop. Tolkien's remarks show that the lost script was extremely poor. Zimmerman got names wrong; wrote inappropriate dialogue; made unwarranted additions such as a "fairy castle", and cut incoherently. Tolkien specially disliked Zimmerman's "pull-back towards more conventional 'fairy-stories'." Ferré comments that this may indicate "what might have been Tolkien's own judgement" on later adaptations.

=== Peter Jackson's film trilogy ===
Peter Jackson's film series was released as three films between 2001 and 2003. The budget was $281 million, and together the three films grossed over $2.9 billion worldwide. The series runs for 9 hours, 18 minutes in the "theatrical" or cinema version, and 11 hours, 26 minutes in the extended version released on DVD. Although long for a film trilogy, this was short compared to Tolkien's work, presenting the films' makers with a major challenge of abridgement, compression, and transformation for the production of the series.

Filmgoers and non-academic reviewers rated the films as almost perfect (as films, not as representations of the book), and the trilogy gained many Oscars and other awards (The Two Towers scored "a rare 100%" on Rotten Tomatoes "rough-and-ready measuring system"). Kristin Thompson, reviewing Janet Brennan Croft's early book Tolkien on Film, wrote that "[literary] scholars seem particularly irked by the films' enormous popularity, not just among fans but also among reviewers". She noted that the films have brought a "vastly enlarged" audience to The Lord of the Rings, and perhaps millions of new readers to the book, and that there are "book-firsters" and "film-firsters" among Tolkien fans.

== Differences ==
The film version differs in content from the written version in several ways, including cutting some scenes, adding scenes, adjusting scenes to cope with other changes, such as moving some action to different locations, and adding some minor characters. The differences of content created by the necessary compression and transformation of Tolkien's story inevitably result in differences of style. Commentators have addressed the question of whether the observed differences are appropriate.

Major differences between book and film noted by scholars
| Aspect | Tolkien's book | Jackson's films |
|---|---|---|
| Running time | c. 60 hours for audio book | 9 to 11 hours depending on version |
| Omissions | | Four early chapters visiting Buckland, Old Forest, and Barrow-downs, and meeting Tom Bombadil and the Barrow-wight; one major "novelistic" late chapter, "The Scouring of the Shire" Saruman's death shown, relocated to Isengard, in extended version |
| Themes | Heroic romance, inner moral struggle, addictive nature of power (of the One Ring) | Aragorn as hero of hero's journey; violent sword-and-sorcery adventure |
| Content | Description, reflection, poetry, song, history recalled in discussion by characters | Landscape, computer-generated imagery, Howard Shore's music, believable costumes, prosthetics, armour, and weapons |
| Structure | Extensive interlacing: readers, like the characters, do not know what is happening to other characters for long periods | Action is largely simultaneous, with intercutting between same-day actions; audience is nearly omniscient |
| Women | Arwen in background until end, narrated in appendix; Éowyn hides her love for Aragorn | Arwen as "warrior princess", her love for Aragorn brought to the fore; Éowyn carries a torch for Aragorn. |

=== Transformation ===
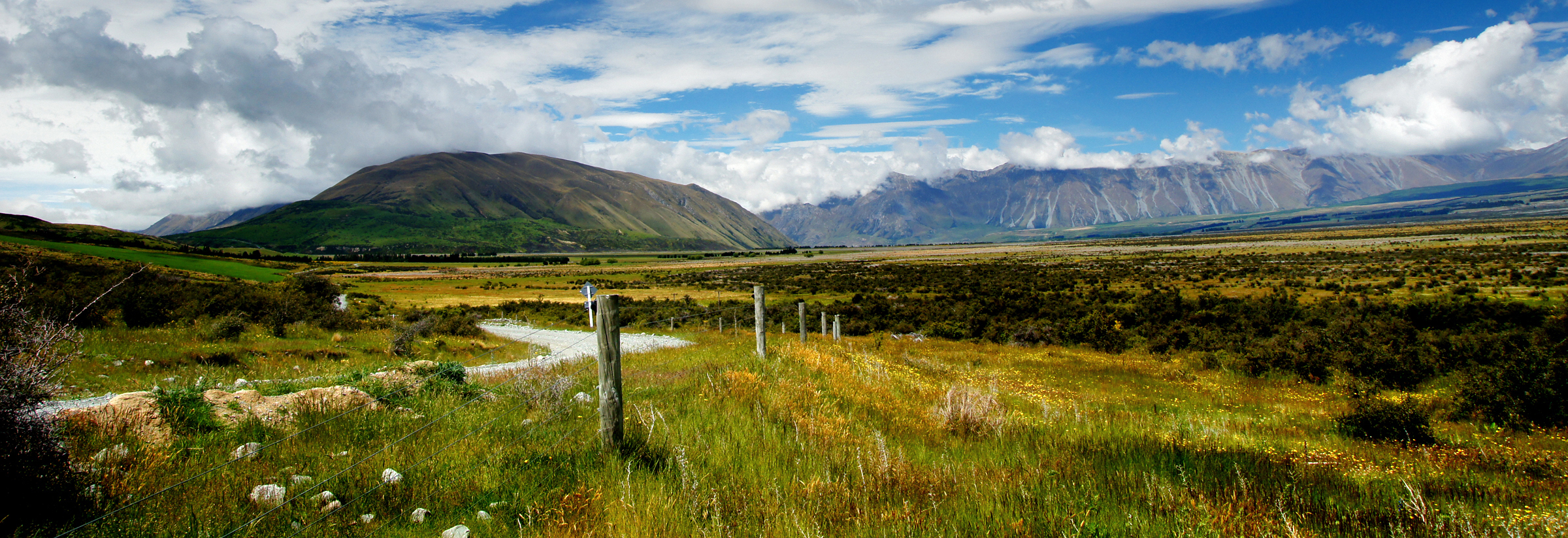
Wide panoramas of New Zealand's high country landscape (here, near Canterbury) replaced Tolkien's landscape descriptions in Jackson's films.

There are several reasons why a film-maker would need to make alterations while adapting the source text of The Lord of the Rings to a screenplay, not least its length. Tolkien's version contains a variety of types of writing, especially descriptions of landscape, characters, and their appearance, namely narrative, dialogue, and embedded songs and poems. As Joseph Ricke and Catherine Barnett write, "Tolkien's characters … – like the narrative in which they exist – pause often for reflection, lamentation, poetry, song, moral inventory, refocusing, wrestling with their consciences, and debating their commitment to the mission before them." Furthermore, the main text is supplemented by a prologue on the nature of hobbits, the distinctive small people of an England-like region of Middle-earth, and the social and political organisation of their home, the Shire. It is accompanied by six lengthy appendices describing the history of Middle-earth's kings, its chronology over more than 6,000 years of the Second and Third Ages, family trees, calendars, and guides to pronunciation and the Elvish scripts, and to the languages of Middle-earth. Film has different capabilities from prose fiction. The film version translates descriptions of landscape into actual landscapes, whether those of New Zealand or computer-generated imagery; something of the feeling aroused by the descriptions is conveyed by the choice of landscape and the photography, from woodland scenes in the Shire to wide panoramas of majestic mountains. Subtle effects such as Tolkien's indirect suggestion of the power of the One Ring are difficult to replicate by such means. Dialogue is sometimes taken unchanged from the book, but much is cut; some elements are voiced by other characters.

The Tolkien scholar Tom Shippey noted that Jackson was under much greater financial pressure than Tolkien, who was risking nothing more than his spare time. In his view, Jackson was obliged to address different audiences, including teenagers who expected Arwen to have some of the characteristics of a "warrior princess", and who delighted in jokes about Dwarf-tossing, something that, he commented, Tolkien would not have understood.

=== Omissions ===
The early chapters "A Conspiracy Unmasked", "The Old Forest", "In the House of Tom Bombadil", and "Fog on the Barrow-Downs", all of which concern a deviation on the hobbits' journey from their home in the Shire to the village of Bree, are essentially omitted completely, though brief mentions of these are made later. The penultimate chapter "The Scouring of the Shire", in which the hobbits use the skills of leadership and warfare that they have acquired to cleanse their home region of the enemy, is omitted, although a vision of it is seen by Frodo in the Mirror of Galadriel.

=== Additions ===
An addition to Tolkien's main text that critics felt worked well is the incorporation of an appendix, "The Tale of Aragorn and Arwen", as a secondary plot line on the "bittersweet love affair" between a man, one of the heroes of the film, and an immortal Elf. Another major addition is the attack on Aragorn by cavalry Orcs riding wolflike Wargs, leaving him wounded and unconscious. The entire episode is a digression from the main story; Shippey suggested it was inserted to provide more of a role for the beautiful but distant Elf-woman Arwen, who helps to bring Aragorn back to life.

=== Transformations of structure ===
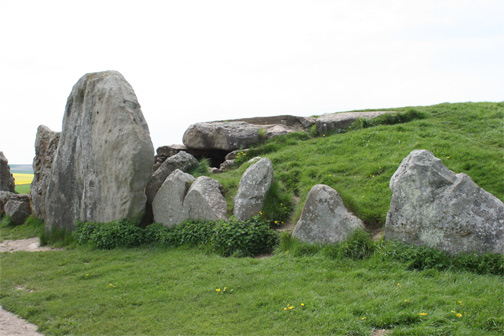
Forced transformation: since the Barrow-downs scene was cut (West Kennet Long Barrow pictured), the hobbits were not carrying barrow-blades when they needed weapons on Weathertop, so Aragorn suddenly produces four hobbit-sized swords. It is not explained how he knew there would be four hobbits.

Jackson decided to make use of some of the "history" (events long before the main action of The Lord of the Rings, described in the appendices and recalled in dialogue in the Council of Elrond, midway through the first volume) in a dramatic film prologue. It begins with Sauron's forging of the One Ring in the Second Age, his overthrow by an alliance of Elves and Men, and the taking of the Ring by Isildur, a distant ancestor of Aragorn. This resolves a major problem for the film-maker in the narrative, namely that Tolkien tells much of the history through "talking heads", reflecting long after the events on what they meant, which conflicts with the basic "show, don't tell" principle of film.

A major structural change was Jackson's decision to abandon Tolkien's interlacing structure (entrelacement) and replace it with a story told in chronological order, with intercutting between characters in different places at the same time. This may make the narrative easier to follow, but it allows the audience to know more than the characters do, undercutting the feeling that choices must be made based on personal courage in the face of incomplete knowledge. One of the scriptwriters, Philippa Boyens, stated that the trilogy was simply their interpretation of the written work. Jackson asserted that it would not be possible to film a straight retelling of the story on screen, and said of his version "Sure, it's not really The Lord of the Rings … but it could still be a pretty damn cool movie."

Other scenes have necessarily been adjusted to handle the effects of cuts and other changes. The death of the Wizard Saruman is moved to his fortress of Isengard and to an earlier time, as the end-of-book action on returning to the hobbits' home the Shire is omitted. A second example: In the book's narrative, the hobbits visit the Barrow-downs, acquiring ancient blades from the barrow hoard in the natural course of events. In the film, however, they do not traverse the Barrow-downs. Instead, Aragorn gives them the needed blades on Weathertop as the party is threatened with imminent attack. He just happens, as the Tolkien scholar John Rateliff comments, to be carrying four hobbit-sized swords with him, even though he had only been expecting to meet Frodo and Sam.

=== Transformations of characters ===
In her edited collection Picturing Tolkien, Janet Brennan Croft states that many of Jackson's characters are "demonstrably different" from Tolkien's: she lists Arwen, Faramir, Denethor, Théoden, Treebeard, Gimli, and "even Frodo, Sam, and Gollum". But the character she picks out as radically transformed is the hero Aragorn, who appears as a humble Ranger of the North, and ends as King of Gondor and Arnor. She suggests that the changes reflect Joseph Campbell's "heroic 'monomyth'" in which the hero ventures into a supernatural realm, fights strange forces, wins, and returns with enhanced power. The American variant is that the hero begins as a lone outsider, seeks justice for the community, is morally pure, and returns accepted by the community. Croft writes that Tolkien's quest fits Campbell's model quite closely, but that it is Frodo who sets out as the fairytale hero, the ordinary person who as Verlyn Flieger writes "stumbles into heroic adventure and does the best he can"; Tolkien then switches about Frodo's and Aragorn's roles as heroes. Jackson puts the Shire under violent threat from the start. Tolkien has Aragorn always aiming for marriage with Arwen; Jackson, in keeping with the chastity required in the American monomyth, has Aragorn avoid both Arwen and Éowyn, who carries a torch for him.

Both critics and film-makers are aware that transformations can be controversial. The scholar of literature Victoria Gaydosik notes that the screenwriters Fran Walsh and Philippa Boyens joke about "crimes against the book" on the extended edition DVD, and investigates the transformation of Arwen in the films. In the film of The Fellowship of the Ring, Arwen takes on elements of the "warrior princess" role not found in the book. This prompted debate on fan sites about how she might feature in The Two Towers: A photograph showed Arwen "in full armor wielding her father's sword at Helm's Deep", but what Boyens jokingly called that "slight departure" from Tolkien did not appear in the film of The Two Towers, where Arwen returns to being "passively feminine". In the book she does not appear at all, only her hand-woven banner for her fiancé Aragorn being mentioned. Walsh confirmed that the conception of Arwen in the script changed radically before the release of The Two Towers in the face of fan opinion.

== Effective film technique ==
Critics and scholars have largely agreed that the film makes fine use of visual imagery and music to convey an impression of Middle-earth, from the New Zealand landscapes to the use of casting, costumes, prosthetics and digital effects to create characters and action.

=== Visual imagery ===
Verlyn Flieger felt that when used with restraint, as in the case of Boromir's boat funeral, the film's use of visual imagery was "effective and moving".

Many commentators have admired the film's translation of Middle-earth architecture and landscapes to Jackson's New Zealand. In his book Tolkien: A Cultural Phenomenon, Brian Rosebury wrote that "The attentiveness to the original text's descriptions of locales is often quite remarkable: The West Wall of Moria, the Argonath and the lake of Nen Hithoel, Helm's Deep, Minas Tirith, all provide the Tolkien reader with a satisfying shock of recognition". The scholar of humanities Kim Selling found the evocation of the look of Middle-earth and the "eliciting of wonder" "marvellously realized". She felt that the trilogy achieved this both with its many strange creatures, whether beautiful or horrifying, but through landscape and setting, and special effects like half-height hobbits and the creation of the monster Gollum. In her view, these succeeded in the terms set out for believable fantasy in Tolkien's 1939 essay "On Fairy Stories".

Even scholars generally hostile to the film version have respected its visual presentation. David Bratman stated that "I felt as if I were seeing two films at once. One in the visuals, which was faithful and true to Tolkien, and another in the script and in the general tone and style, which was so unfaithful as to be a travesty." Verlyn Flieger found much of the film's imagery problematic but praised its effect when used with restraint, as in the case of Boromir's "magisterial" boat funeral, which she called "effective and moving". Daniel Timmons found the "cinematography, art direction, sets, props, and costumes" spectacular, calling this "probably Jackson's finest achievement". He admired the motion-capture that in his view brilliantly animated the Ring-obsessed monster Gollum, and the special effects that made the Wizard Gandalf's battle with the fiery monstrous Balrog in the caverns of Moria so effective.

=== Music ===
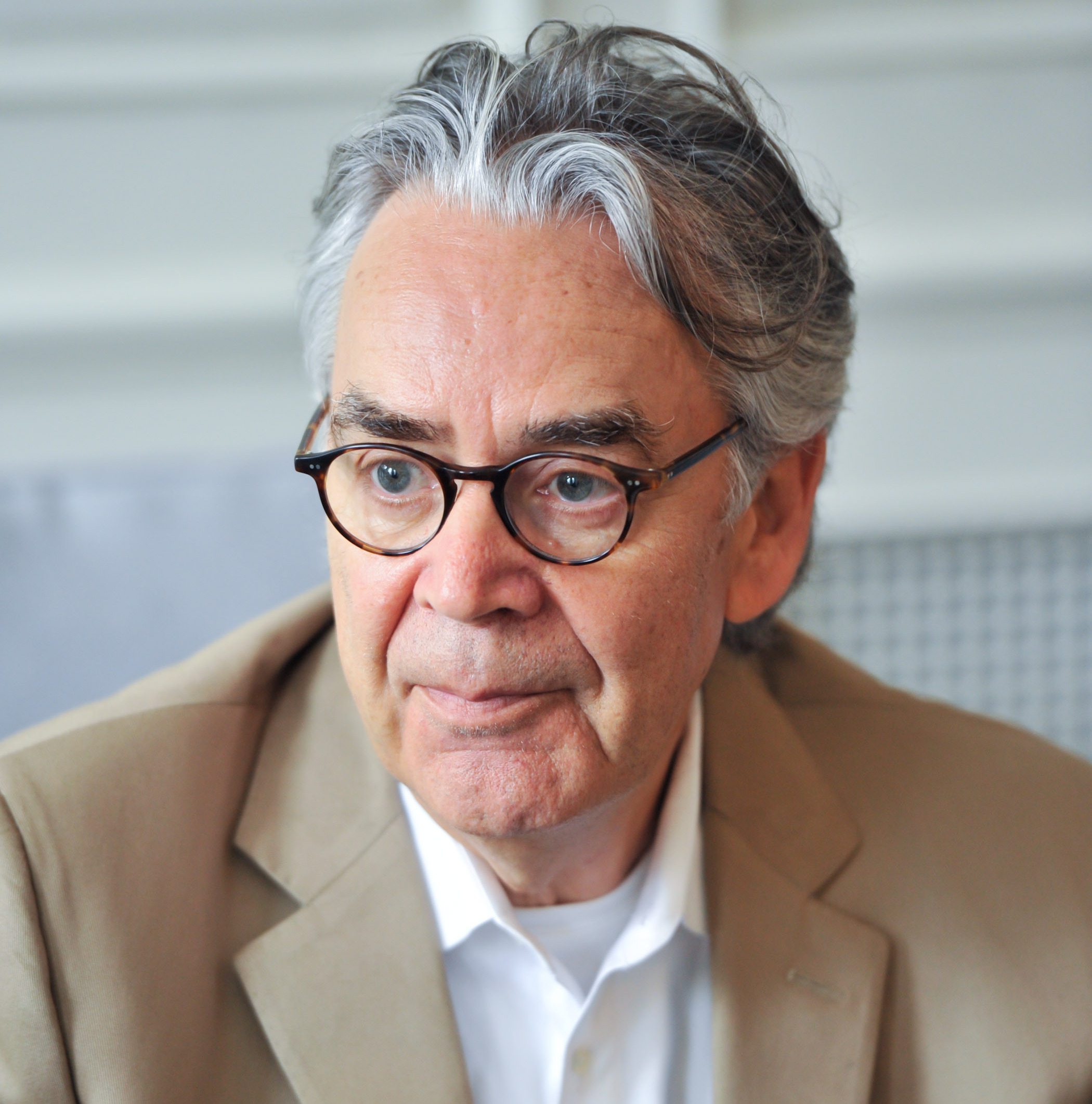
Howard Shore, composer of The Lord of the Rings film score

The Tolkien scholar Kristin Thompson noted that "even the film's harshest critics" agree that its design elements, including its music, which was composed by Howard Shore, are "superb". Where additional variety was required, other composers and performers were recruited. For example, the Irish Celtic fusion singer and songwriter Enya created a piece for an Elvish scene in Rivendell. Selling cited Erica Sheen's remark that a film adaptation converts a book into a soundtrack, conveying emotion by combining images, words, and music, and argued that Jackson's films successfully "replicate the pleasurable experiences elicited by narrative". The final song, "Into the West", sung by Annie Lennox to Shore's music with lyrics by Fran Walsh, "intriguing[ly]" modulates the end of the last film "to a tone closer to that of the novel", write Judy Ann Ford and Robin Anne Reid; its lyrics speak of "weeping, shadows, and fading", counteracting the image of dazzling light presented by the film, and echoing the note of pessimism and doubt in Tolkien's ending.

Estelle Jorgensen considers how Tolkien's text translates to film, and in particular how the implicit music of Tolkien's poetry is realized, both visually and aurally. She cites Jackson's remark that Tolkien's "music" is "imaginary", objecting only that his Gregorian chanting of "Namárië" and his "dramatic" performance of "Ride of the Rohirrim" give "a glimpse" of how he imagined his songs might have sounded. Jackson, she writes, omitted Tom Bombadil and Goldberry, along with all their music, and Galadriel's singing, too, is dropped. Jackson acknowledged his musical limitations, relying on Shore to represent Tolkien's music. Shore stated that he wanted to "re-insert" Tolkien's verse into his score with choral versions of songs in Tolkien's invented languages. Jorgensen comments that be that as it may, songs such as "May It Be" and "Aníron" are set to words not by Tolkien, while most of Tolkien's "rich" provision of hobbit songs is absent from the score. She notes that the score is "pervasively orchestral and tonal" in keeping with Shore's intention to create "a feeling of antiquity", almost as if the music had been "discovered" rather than newly written. She comments that the actual result is rather different: "What happens, however, is that while the music lends another dimension to sight, it is swallowed up by sight...; the audience's focus is primarily upon the screen." She notes, on the other hand, that the use of familiar leitmotifs from the earlier films in The Return of the King helps to tie the trilogy together, while the song over the credits, "Into the West", wrapped "in now familiar musical material ... helps to create a musical unity".

== Handling the book's spirit ==
Commentators have differed on how well the films manage to represent the spirit of the book, from feeling that it had been lost or the characters flattened, to granting that some elements were lost but others suitably substituted, to seeing the films as a remarkable cinematic tribute to Tolkien.

=== Eviscerated ===
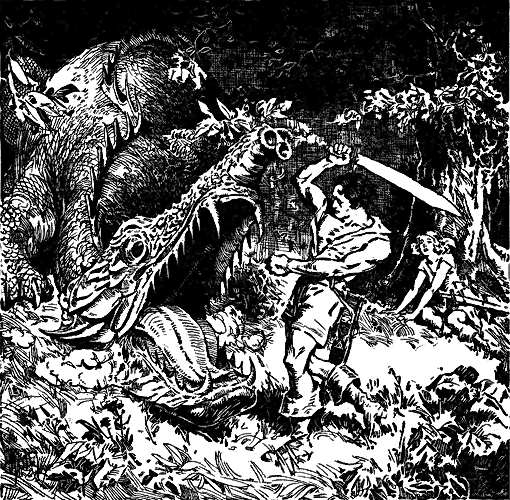
The scholar David Bratman felt that Jackson had reduced Tolkien's book to a sword-and-sorcery adventure story. 1936 illustration for "Red Nails" by Harold S. De Lay

Some scholars felt that the spirit of the book had been lost. Bratman wrote that Jackson has "taken out just about everything that makes The Lord of the Rings a strikingly unique work, one which we love, and reduced it to a generic sword-and-sorcery adventure story … Condensation is not the issue: the evisceration of Tolkien's spirit is the issue." He wrote that he did enjoy "those few moments which come straight from the book", such as Frodo and Gandalf's discussing the moral issue around Gollum, which he called "scenes from a different movie, the one I wish Jackson had made". Christopher Tolkien, editor of his father's Middle-earth manuscripts, stated that "The Lord of the Rings is peculiarly unsuitable to transformation into visual dramatic form", and that the films had "eviscerated" the book.

Rosebury mourned the loss of "some of the book's greatest virtues" including English understatement, emotional tact, and spaciousness. He regretted the absence of the book's emphasis on free will and individual responsibility. He was sorry, too, about the film version's choice of physical conflict over rhetorical power, "dignity of presence[,] or force of intellect". Timmons commented that a deft touch was needed to balance artistic integrity with Hollywood's demands and that Jackson had "often failed" to achieve that balance. In his view, the "orgy of Orc killing" at the end of The Fellowship of the Ring made the film quite implausible; Jackson continually "minimizes mood development and dialogue, and offers seemingly nonstop flights and fights"; and "the significance of Frodo's inner journey becomes submerged in frenetic action". Timmons felt that in scenes like Frodo's meeting with Strider, the stay in Lothlórien, the fall of Saruman from his position as first among Wizards, and the tense meeting of Gandalf with the powerful but mentally-tortured Denethor, the hasty coverage seriously weakened the story.

Ǿystein Hǿgset evaluates the films against the film theorist Dudley Andrew's three modes of adaptation. These are borrowing, meaning re-creating the feeling of the original, which is used just for inspiration; the use of unaltered fragments; and "fidelity and transformation", adapting the whole text and its meaning. Hǿgset argues that Jackson attempts the third mode, but includes both of the others as well. In his view, Jackson does not pass the fidelity test. For instance, in the good/evil conflict, the film ends with the destruction of evil, where the book remains fully nuanced even after the end of the One Ring. Hǿgset concludes that Jackson's film version so seriously fails to represent the spirit of the book that it fails as an adaptation.

=== Characters flattened ===
Tolkien scholars such as Wayne G. Hammond, Janet Brennan Croft and Carl Hostetter felt that many characters had not been depicted faithfully: They had essentially been flattened from complex, rounded characters with strengths and weaknesses to simple types or caricatures. Croft called the film versions of Aragorn and Frodo "strangely diminished"; she noted that Hostetter described Aragorn as less noble, more full of angst, and Frodo more of a wimp. Using the critic Northrop Frye's literary modes, Croft described Tolkien's Aragorn as "the typical hero of romance, who is 'superior in degree to other men and his environment'", whereas Frodo is a hero of the high mimetic mode, superior to other men but not to his environment. She concluded that Jackson's screenplay aims at "Hollywood's lowest common denominator … the pathos of the low-mimetic mode and the irresistible power of the American … monomyth", allowing the audience to identify with the "lone redeemer, riding into town, … saving the day, and galloping off into the sunset", whereas Tolkien challenges his readers to "emulate timeless characters of a higher mode than ourselves".

The independent scholars and publishers Anthony S. Burdge and Jessica Burke make use of Frye's classification of literary modes to argue that the film interpretation "fails miserably" in one of what they consider Tolkien's major achievements, to "[resurrect] images of the hero." Tolkien, they write, used his reading of legends about medieval heroes from Beowulf to King Arthur to create a cast of heroes (Aragorn, Faramir, Frodo, Sam... and perhaps, following Deborah Rogers, whom they cite, all the hobbits) who function at each of Frye's literary modes. Further, Jackson and the films' screenwriters, Philippa Boyens and Fran Walsh, in their view fail to grasp this theme; nor "how many of Tolkien's protagonists shift amongst the modes", indeed climbing steadily and heroically up "the ladder of Frye's modes". In short, they argue, Jackson effectively "flatten[s] Tolkien's heroes into one mode, thereby demoralizing and humiliating Tolkien's creation." Alongside this disastrous flattening of character, Burdge and Burke comment that by making the One Ring the incarnation of evil, its destruction means the end of all evil. Tolkien, they note, never implied anything so crude: Jackson and his team thus failed to grasp "the nuances and profundity of Tolkien's creation." The anti-heroes Saruman and Denethor are equally mishandled, and for the same reason, the subtlety of their intelligences and characters flattened, replaced by devices like "creating a pathetic need for tension between Denethor and Gandalf", while by elevating Saruman and lowering Gandalf, Jackson breaks Tolkien's careful balance of forces.

Tom Shippey found Jackson's tendencies for "democratisation" and "emotionalisation" problematic, writing that where Tolkien has a clear hierarchy, Jackson is happy to enlarge the parts of humble characters like the servant-hobbit Sam, who converts Faramir to supporting the quest, or the young hobbit Pippin, who (unlike in Tolkien's version) persuades the tree-giant Treebeard to attack the fallen wizard Saruman's fortress of Isengard. Where Tolkien's Denethor is a cold ruler doing his best for his country, Jackson's is made to look greedy and self-indulgent: Shippey calls the scene where he gobbles a meal, while his son Faramir has been sent out in a hopeless fight, a "blatant [use] of cinematic suggestion".

Christianity Today wrote that the films "missed the moral and religious depths" of the book, such as when they turned "the awful subtlety and complexity of evil" into something trivially obvious. It gave as an instance the reduction of Tolkien's sadly conflicted Gollum to a "pathetically comic and merely devious figure", and the caricaturing of the powerful Steward of Gondor, Denethor, as "a snarling and drooling oaf rather than a noble pessimist".

=== Preserved by appropriate substitution ===
Some critics and scholars freely admitted that the film version differed from the book, but felt that it appropriately substituted other elements for those that could not be preserved. Daniel Timmons recorded that the film critics of major newspapers both pointed out the trilogy's weaknesses, as when Roger Ebert said of Jackson's The Fellowship of the Ring that it was "more of a sword and sorcery epic than a realization of [Tolkien's] more naive and guileless vision", and on the other hand gave Jackson "high praise". Robin Anne Reid analysed the grammar used by Tolkien, which she stated often dwells on the environment, with devices such as placing the characters into subordinate clauses, and the equivalent visual grammar used by Jackson. In her view, the cinematography successfully mirrors the text, except when Frodo and Sam are approaching Mordor, where Reid found the film "perfunctory in its construction of Ithilien compared to earlier scenes". Against that, she considered that the lighting of the beacons to summon the riders of Rohan to Gondor, a lengthy scene at 98 seconds, "exceeds the impact of the novel because of the cinematic narrator's ability to move away from a single character's point of view to dramatize the event".

Selling stated that a film adaptation's success requires the film-makers to persuade the audience that their interpretation is valid. She noted that Jackson, Philippa Boyens and Fran Walsh were, as both screenwriters and fans themselves, acutely aware of the "fidelity to the original text expected by the wider community of Tolkien fans". They knew that the books were "unfilmable" without transformation, so they set about "translat[ing]" Tolkien's core themes into film. They preserved Tolkien's dialogue wherever they could, sometimes moving lines to a different time, place, or character, as when Gandalf makes a speech in the Mines of Moria before arriving at Balin's tomb, whereas, in the book, the words are spoken in Frodo's home in the Shire, before he sets out. Selling found that the transformations, such as the substitution of the Elf-lady Arwen for the Elf-lord Glorfindel in The Fellowship of the Ring, were mainly successful, but that the omission of the entire Tom Bombadil sequence was more damaging.

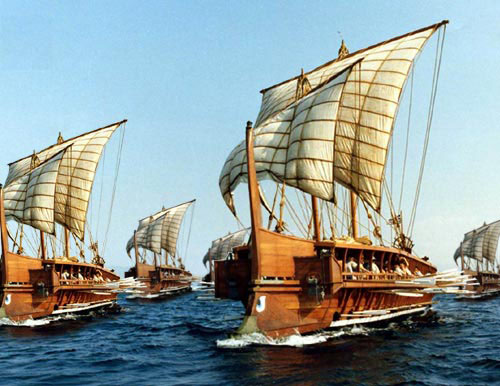
Aragorn's unexpected arrival in the captured Corsairs of Umbar's ships - that Tolkien called Dromonds, like these Ancient Greek galleys - is intercut, replacing Tolkien's elaborate interlacing in Jackson's film with Éowyn's desperate battle against the Witch-king to create, by quite different means, a Tolkienesque eucatastrophe.

The medievalist and Tolkien scholar Yvette Kisor wrote that while Jackson had been unfaithful to Tolkien's narrative technique (such as interlacing), character development and motivation, and specific events, he had continually striven to be faithful "to the totality of Tolkien's epic – its impact, its look and feel, and, perhaps, some of its themes". In her view, he allowed himself "unusually free reshuffling" of scenes to simplify the chronology, but managed to build the Tolkienesque themes of "providence, eucatastrophe [sudden happy reversal], interconnectedness" through skilful intercutting and use of music. She gives as an example Éowyn's battle with the Witch-king, intercut with Aragorn's unlooked-for arrival with an army in the captured ships of the Corsairs of Umbar. The scene looks like her defeat, and indeed the defeat of the army of the West, along with the Witch-king's triumphant prophecy "You fool – no man can kill me" and a break in the music, suddenly reversed as the music restarts with her revelation of herself as a woman, and her killing him. The method of narration is not Tolkien's, but the effect is similarly eucatastrophic.

James Dunning writes that there are three large spiritual themes "behind events in Middle-earth". Firstly, constant decline and fall from the power of earlier ages. Secondly, "The Shadow" is constantly scheming to take control. Thirdly, a power of providence acts through ordinary people, brave warriors, and even the mistakes of the enemy, appearing as luck or pure chance. The wise, like Gandalf and Elrond, drop remarks like "I think this task is appointed for you, Frodo". And the book warns of the danger of trying to double-guess fate by looking in mirrors or seeing stones. Dunning suggests that via film these messages may "perhaps" reach people who never read Tolkien. In short, he writes, "render unto Jackson that which is Jackson's, and unto Tolkien that which is Tolkien's."

The writer Diana Paxson, describing herself as a lover of the book version, said she found watching the films a "fascinating, if sometimes mixed, experience". Seeing the films "refreshed" her re-readings of the book; she felt that the films showed "in rich detail" things "all too briefly described" by Tolkien, though the text provided dialogue and explanation skipped over by the films. She writes that "a surprising number" of lines of dialogue survive in the films, though often transposed, continuing a process begun by Tolkien, who as his son Christopher notes, often moved conversations into fresh contexts, voiced by different speakers. She concludes that it is possible for multiple versions all to be valid and that it is "a story that can survive being retold".

=== Well represented ===
Critics, scholars, fans, (Note: Fans have extensively discussed the faithfulness of Jackson's trilogy to Tolkien's book on a variety of discussion boards, for example of the realism and appropriateness of the weapons used at "The realisticness of 'The Lord of the Rings'". Myarmoury.com.) and others have described Jackson's adaptation of The Lord of the Rings as a success. Chauncey Mabe, in The Los Angeles Times, wrote of The Two Towers that "Tolkien fanatics, the kind who wear furry rubber hobbit feet to the theater, ... are praising Jackson for being true to the spirit, not the letter, of Tolkien’s books." The scholar of culture Douglas Kellner stated that the conservative community spirit of Tolkien's Shire is reflected in Jackson's films as well as the division of the Fellowship into "squabbling races".

The actor Ian McKellen, who played Gandalf in the film trilogy, and who had adapted Shakespeare's play Richard III to a 1995 film, called Jackson's adaptation "perhaps the most faithful screenplay ever adapted from a long novel." He stated that this was because the scriptwriters had been "devoted to the original and would share other fans' resentment if it were "mistreated", and because Tolkien's storylines were clearer than those of Dickens or Tolstoy. McKellen added that the films "augment our appreciation" of the book. Guido Henkel, reviewing the extended edition DVD of The Fellowship of the Ring for DVD Review & High Definition, and describing himself as "a hardcore fan" of the book, called the adaptation "faithful". He commented that one could not "dissect the film like an annotation to the novel" because a film has "different requirements and dynamics". He acknowledged the inevitable omissions, but stated that Jackson "did indeed manage to capture the essence of the books".

Gandalf reappears shining white and unrecognised by his companions, like Jesus after his resurrection. Steven D. Greydanus cites this as an instance of Peter Jackson's willingness to honour the Catholic theme of the book.

Steven D. Greydanus, film critic for the National Catholic Register, called Jackson's trilogy "an extraordinary cinematic tribute to a great work of Catholic imagination". He noted that Tolkien described his book as "a fundamentally religious and Catholic work", with clear allusions to "the hand of Providence", though religion almost never appears on the surface. Greydanus noted that Jackson and his team were aware of Tolkien's faith, while not sharing it, and intended to honour the themes of his book. He gave as one of many examples of this willingness the death and return of Gandalf, fighting the Balrog, "as hellish as Jackson's conceptual artists and the Weta effects people could make it", falling into the abyss with his arms extended as if on a cross, and returning "shining like a painting of the risen Christ" as he appears to Aragorn, Legolas, and Gimli, "who like [Jesus's] disciples are at first unable to recognize him". The scholar Mark Stucky considered that Jackson had possibly managed to portray the returned Gandalf as Tolkien would have wanted, noting that Tolkien felt he had not got the return right. Frodo, too, Greydanus wrote, symbolically dies in the giant spider Shelob's lair and is reborn, and walks his Via Dolorosa on the way to Mount Doom to destroy the Ring, while Aragorn walks the Paths of the Dead. He concluded that while the film trilogy does not equal the book's religious vision, it succeeds in honouring that vision in a way that works for Christians, while giving "non-Christian postmoderns" a "rare encounter with an unironic vision of good and evil, a moral vision of evil as derivative of good and of the ever-present human susceptibility to temptation". Timmons agreed, writing that Tolkien's core story, that the Ring insidiously tempted everyone to evil, was effectively told, through the Ring's "subtle and seductive voice".

== Going beyond Tolkien ==
Some authorities have analysed how Jackson has gone beyond Tolkien, creating his own take on Middle-earth, and in the process creating a community of fans united by shared interest and knowledge, and open to discussing and creating a body of new work – a fan film culture, or a modern folklore – informed by, but different from, both Tolkien's and Jackson's.

=== Creating a fan film culture ===
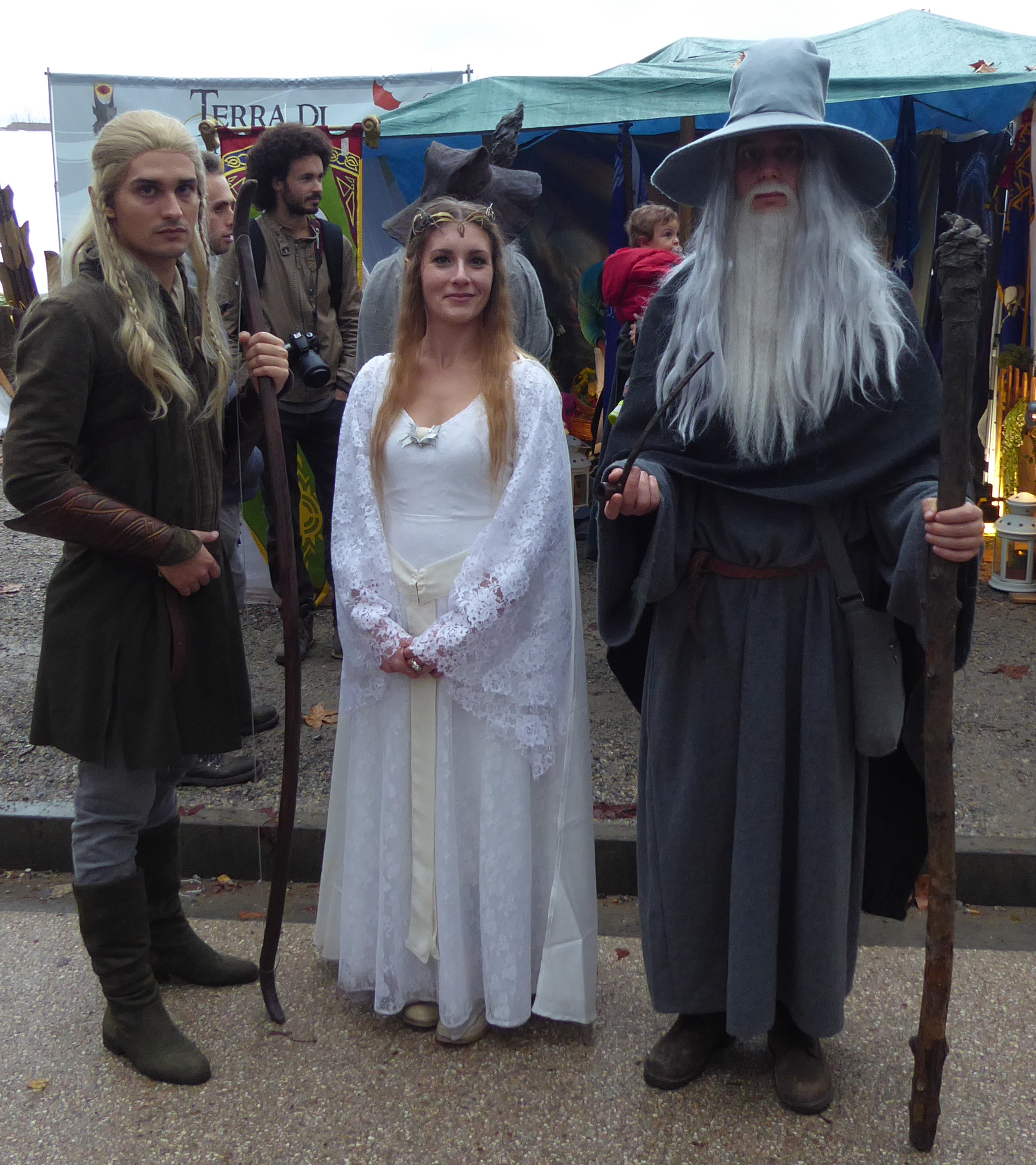
Fan film culture: Tolkien fans in costume at Lucca Comics & Games 2019

The scholar Maria Alberto wrote that Jackson had created a "fan film culture" in a large community that shared interest in and knowledge of Middle-earth. The film scholar Lothar Mikos and colleagues noted that Jackson's film trilogy had created a phenomenon in the shape of a fan culture which encompassed a passion for books, video games and every possible kind of merchandise. Selling wrote that the films had certainly led many fans to read Tolkien's book. Alberto stated that critical voices such as Fimi and Croft had written about how Tolkien fans could be unforgiving of any deviation from the text, but that Jackson had carefully balanced fan reaction and the need for commercial success of his film trilogy.

The success with fans could be seen, Alberto remarked, in the fan films Born of Hope, directed by Kate Madison in 2009, and The Hunt for Gollum directed by Chris Bouchard that same year. Born of Hope, for instance, drew on "a couple of paragraphs" by Tolkien in an appendix on the Tale of Aragorn and Arwen, added its own original characters, ties its story in to other elements of Middle-earth, and references Jackson's film treatment with its choice of rugged filming locations, Viggo Mortensen's portrayal of Aragorn by casting the similar-looking Christopher Dane as Aragorn's father Arathorn, and by making the Orcs monstrous and ragged in visibly Jacksonian style. It further alludes to Jackson's trilogy, Alberto writes, with techniques such as "accelerated exposition" and an unseen narrator of "ancient story" speaking over "sweeping location shots, battle scenes, and details from a character's life". Reid comments that The Hunt for Gollum fills a gap in the story left by Jackson's decision to omit the hunt; the fan film, she writes, knowledgeably follows Tolkien's story, having Aragorn capture Gollum and hand him over to the Elves, before going further with its own narrative.

The scholar Philip Kaveny wrote that Jackson and Tolkien "found different solutions to similar issues of audience and narrative ... in different media". The film scholar Kristin Thompson stated that Tolkien, his scholars, and his fans "no doubt ... would have been impressed by some elements of [the film trilogy] and annoyed by others". Alberto called it remarkable that Thompson consciously treats both scholars and fans as audiences worthy of consideration.

=== Creating a modern folklore tradition ===
Fimi writes that Jackson had succeeded in transforming Tolkien's book for the screen, in the process creating a modern folklore tradition. She notes that Tolkien made use of medieval myth, legend, and fairytale. In turn, his Middle-earth has, she states, influenced both fantasy authors and the role-playing game industry, redefining or creating widely used races such as Elves, Dwarves, Wizards, and Halflings. Jackson was thus taking on what Weta Workshop's creative supervisor, Richard Taylor, called "an opportunity to bring a piece of modern English folklore to the screen". Fimi notes especially the monstrous Balrog, the graceful Elves, and the Dead Men who follow Aragorn. Tolkien leaves unclear whether the Balrog had wings; it appears as a being of monstrous size, wreathed in flame and shadow. Jackson consulted with fans and decided to give it satanic bat-wings. This "imposed" a definitive form of Tolkien folklore. Tolkien's Elves are rooted firmly, Fimi writes, in Anglo-Saxon, Middle English, and Norse tradition, but influenced also by Celtic fairies in the Tuatha Dé Danann. Jackson's Elves are "Celtic" in the romanticised sense of the Celtic Revival.

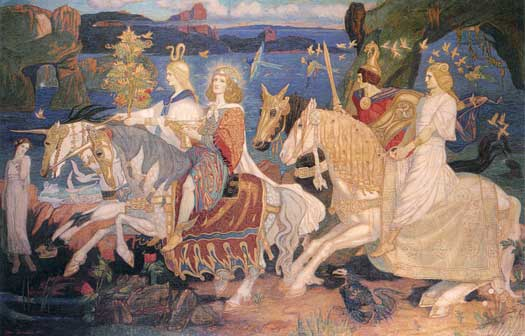
Jackson's Elves resemble those of the 19th–20th century Celtic Revival, as in John Duncan's 1911 painting The Riders of the Sidhe, rather than Tolkien's reconstruction of medieval Elves, according to Dimitra Fimi.

Fimi compares Jackson's representation of Gildor's party of Elves riding through the Shire "moving slowly and gracefully towards the West, accompanied by ethereal music" with John Duncan's 1911 painting The Riders of the Sidhe. She notes that Jackson's conceptual designer, the illustrator Alan Lee, had made use of the painting in the 1978 book Faeries. Tolkien does not attempt to describe the Dead, noting only the reactions of dread they inspire in Aragorn's men and the Dwarf Gimli in the dark and chilling "Paths of the Dead". Jackson's Dead are instead "visible in a misty greenish light, partly skeletons, partly ghosts and partly rotten-fleshed zombies", following cinematic tradition. Fimi commented that the more embodied form for the Dead Men probably prevailed because they had to fight a battle (for the Corsair's ships); she noted that Jackson's first successes as a director were horror films.

The scholar of fantasy literature Amy Sturgis noted that the Tolkien fan fiction community rests on the shoulders of both Tolkien and Jackson: Their writings explore the intersection of Tolkien's text and Jackson's visualisations, and the gaps between them, or use Jackson's departures from the book to create alternate universes. She wrote that the "new cyberculture" that has grown around such writing is big, with (by 2005) over 29,000 Lord of the Rings stories on Fanfiction.net and many specialised archives such as Henneth Annûn, which had (by 2005) over 1,000 Tolkien-based stories; (Note: The Henneth Annûn Story Archive is at "Henneth Annûn Story Archive". Organization for Transformative Works.) that it is diverse, with conventions, printed fanzines, fiction awards, discussion boards, blogs, journals, and role-playing games; and unusual, in not being constrained to one central text. She concluded from this that Jackson's trilogy had stimulated "a remarkable degree of fan creativity, production, and dialogue".

== See also ==
- Christopher Nolan's interpretation of The Odyssey – another director's take on a classic book

== Sources ==
- Carpenter, Humphrey, ed. (2023) [1981]. The Letters of J. R. R. Tolkien: Revised and Expanded Edition. New York: HarperCollins. ISBN 978-0-35-865298-4.
- Bogstad, Janice M.; Kaveny, Philip E., eds. (2011). Picturing Tolkien: Essays on Peter Jackson's The Lord of the Rings Film Trilogy. McFarland & Company. ISBN 978-0-7864-8473-7.
- Croft, Janet Brennan, ed. (2004). Tolkien on Film: Essays on Peter Jackson's The Lord of the Rings. Mythopoeic Press. ISBN 978-1-887726-09-2.
- Honegger, Thomas, ed. (2011b) [2004]. Translating Tolkien: Text and Film. Cormarë series. Vol. 6. Walking Tree Publishers. ISBN 978-3-9521424-9-3.
- Matthijs, Ernest; Pomerance, Murray, eds. (2006). From Hobbits to Hollywood: Essays on Peter Jackson's Lord of the Rings. Editions Rodopi. ISBN 978-90-420-1682-8.
