= Dimitris Liantinis =

Greek philosopher

- Born: Dimitrios Nikolakakos; 23 July 1942; Polovitsa, Laconia, Peloponnese, Greece
- Died: unknown; disappeared on 1 June 1998 (aged 55) in Taygetos, Peloponnese, Greece

Education
- Education: University of Athens (B.A., 1966); LMU Munich; University of Athens (Ph.D., 1977)

Philosophical work
- Era: 20th-century philosophy
- Region: Western philosophy
- School: Continental philosophy
- Institutions: University of Athens
- Main interests: Ancient Greek philosophy, the Romantic movement
- Notable ideas: Revival of Classicism and Romanticism

Dimitris Liantinis (/ˌliːɑːnˈtiːnɪs/; Greek: Δημήτρης Λιαντίνης [ʎa(n)ˈdinis]; born Dimitrios Nikolakakos; born 23 July 1942, disappeared 1 June 1998) was a Greek philosopher. He was associate professor at the Department of Pedagogy of the Faculty of Philosophy, Pedagogy and Psychology of the University of Athens, teaching the course "Philosophy of Education and Teaching of Greek Language and Literature". He has written nine books. His last and most seminal work, Gemma (Γκέμμα) has been translated into several languages.

A great lover of Ancient Greek culture, he devoted his life to studying and reinterpreting their cultural heritage. He wrote on various philosophical issues, including education, morality and death. He emphasised the need to incorporate the Ancient Greek ideas and morals into the modern Greek education system and also held explicit views on the decline of Western culture.

He has achieved popularity in Greece because of his strange and unexplained disappearance on the morning of 1 June 1998 at the age of 55 years. It is thought that he died as a result of suicide in 1998 on the mountains of Taygetos. His last university lecture was delivered on 27 May 1998. In his letter to his family, he wrote, "I go away by my own will. I disappear standing, strong, and proud."

== Life and work ==
Liantinis was born in the Laconian village of Polobitsa and his descent was from the nearby village of Liantina. His birth name was Dimitrios Nikolakakos (Δημήτριος Νικολακάκος). He later changed his surname to Liantinis to honour his village. He graduated in 1966 from the University of Athens' curriculum of Philosophy and worked as a teacher. He moved to Munich in 1970 to study the German language at LMU Munich, where he remained until 1972 while at the same time teaching at the Greek school of Otto Gesellschaft. In 1977 he completed his PhD thesis (titled "The Presence of the Greek Spirit in Duino Elegies by Rainer Maria Rilke") under the supervision of Evangelos Moutsopoulos. From 1975 to 1988 he was a lecturer and later professor in the National and Kapodestrian University of Athens.

He was the author of nine books, principally on philosophy and education and has translated Friedrich Nietzsche's Ecce Homo in the Greek language.

In 1973 he married philosophy professor Nicolitsa Georgopoulou, with whom he had a daughter, Diotima, who is currently a professor at the faculty of Social Theology of the Theological School of the University of Athens.

== Core philosophical views ==
Liantinis' system of ideas was greatly influenced by the philosophy of Ancient Greece as well as the ideals of the Romantic movement and the works of Friedrich Nietzsche. He made numerous references to the scientific achievements of his time, especially in the realm of cosmology, and he attempted to formulate a connection between it and questions concerning the existence and nature of God. He wrote extensively about education (παιδεία paideia) which was his own field of work, and some of his writings focus on what he saw as the moral and intellectual decline of modern Greeks as contrasted with their ancestors. To establish his position further, he devotes a part of his work in an effort to defining exactly what the real value of Ancient Greece was, as well as the true world-view that they proposed. He argues against the notion that Ancient Greece, although ahead of its time for most of antiquity and perhaps the Middle Ages, was eventually superseded by the advancements in Renaissance Europe. In contrast, he believed that the Greeks possessed a complete culture, a kind of super-set for all Western cultures, past and present. As an example, in his book Gemma he argued that "The Greeks did not need psychoanalysis because they had Tragedy". This period of intellectual brilliance was to be short-lived and Liantinis wrote that "it would be a sign of honesty if the Greeks were to stop philosophizing right after Aristotle" [Πολυχρόνιο 2005]. In contrast, today, Greeks are completely unknown as "...for the Europeans [...] we, the 'New-Greeks', are but a faceless bunch, something of a Balko-Turkish Arab. We are the Ortodox [intentionally misspelled] with the Russian-like writing [...] and the domes on our village houses" [Gemma 1997].

On this topic, he often touched upon the highly controversial issue of the alleged superiority of Greek to Jewish culture, the former being expressed through the ancient philosophers and folk mythology and the latter through the great Judaic religions of Judaism, Islam and most importantly Christianity.

Death was also central to his work and (as he claimed) that of the Ancient Greeks. He denied the notion of Greece as a culture of playful joyfulness and argued that the Greeks had instead presented us with a world of infinite melancholy, an idea that is consistent with that of Nietzsche's whom he greatly admired. Their philosophy was a study of death and their conclusions were absolute and hard to accept since they saw death as a final end, with no afterlife or moral rewards for the life lived on earth. Liadinis adhered to that notion and once again contrasted it to the less heroic view held in the Judaic religions. This could shed new light on his alleged suicide, by potentially infusing it with great moral courage as he ponders on the distance that separates the man who "honours the natural knowledge that once dead he will vanish [...] and the one who is taught to believe that once dead, he will migrate in some heavenly America" [Τα Ελληνικά 1992, p. 126].

=== Classicism and Romanticism ===
Liantinis believed that Romanticism and Classicism are the only "valid" world-views that constitute both an artistic style and a way of life. He believed these two to be antithetical in nature, as the former is an expression of pure emotions while the latter of logic. In his view, the poet J. W. Goethe tried to marry the two and his failed experiment was recorded in the second part of Faust, appropriately called "The Quest for Helen". There, Faust, representing the romantic hero lies in bed with Helen of Troy only to produce a stillborn child. Although the story symbolizes the impossibility of a task, it was deemed so important that many others, like Greece's national poet Dionysios Solomos, took it upon themselves to complete it.

=== Views on education ===
Education was central to what he saw as the long struggle of humanity to rise above the animal level and into something so elaborate that it could in turn explain the Universe that created it, a view that is consistent with the Anthropic Principle to which he has made reference. Education is the carrier of this monumental effort and contains the living memories of its People in the forms of language and poetry. These views are expressed mainly in Homo educandus [1984] and Τα Ελληνικά [1992] (roughly translated as 'The Greek Language'), where he blamed a part of the moral decline of his contemporaries on the shallowness and rigidity with which modern-day teachers transmit knowledge, focusing on form rather than content. Instead, he argued for a qualitative understanding of literature and poetry, as for example in the need to distinguish between the different value levels of various Greek intellectuals, rather than presenting them as a single entity of "the Great Men of Greek letters". He also spoke about the great difficulty in understanding and teaching poetry within this rigid framework in which formal explanations are valued over deep understanding of meaning.

He advocated for a total separation of Church and State, especially in matters of education, since he considers Christianity to be antithetical to Greek thought and one must choose one or the other. Following this stance, he warned against the increasing influence of the then Archbishop Christodoulos of Athens for his involvement in Greek politics.

=== Greek vs Jewish culture ===
This is a vast and highly controversial issue. Liantinis thought of Christianity as the main vessel of Jewish culture in the West and to understand his position better we might want to look at medieval Greek history and the Byzantine Empire, when the church, aligned with the Emperors destroyed what remained of Ancient Greek alongside other Pagan religions, often through brutal means (This somewhat common presupposition of the relation between the rise and confirmation of Christianity (in society) and Paganism, ought to be studied in great detail when considering the same relation in the east between Christians and Pagans; for the violence and harshness which characterises the western Christian stand against Paganism, bears little relevance to what occurred in the east. Therefore, it is perhaps his pro-enlightenment mentality that led Liantinis to suppose that the western Christian action toward Paganism was the same as the eastern Christian one.)

Liantinis' argument, however, is not historical. He claims that the Greeks were morally superior, as they had the courage to create a morality that reflected the finite nature of existence rather than imposing it as the divine law of an imaginary God who guarantees eternal life in the heavens. "The sorrowful longing of death, for the Greeks, gave birth to art. Where the fear of death for other people gave birth to religions" [Τα Ελληνικά 1992, p. 127]. This harshly realistic view proved hard to maintain and in Gemma [1997] he writes that "the Jews cultivated the land of faith. The Greeks cultivated the land of knowledge [...] the Jews were executioners, the Greeks were judges ... that is why the Jews won". This alleged defeat of Greek culture is featured frequently in his work and is illustrated with a thought experiment found in the same book, where contemporary Europeans are asked about Empedocles, Anaximander, Leucippus and other somewhat lesser known yet important philosophers. He presumes that few if any will answer with conviction, yet the same sample would immediately recognise the biblical figures of Moses, Abraham and Noah. He extends these thoughts to seminal thinkers like Sigmund Freud, Albert Einstein and Karl Marx, the "giant Jews of science" as he called them [Gemma 1997], while contemporary Greeks are totally unable to offer anyone of equivalent importance.

=== Views on death ===
According to Liadinis, the notion of death occupied the ancients to such a degree that one could see their whole culture as arising from the radical views they held on the subject. They saw death as an unchanging cosmic law, much like today's notion of entropy, and did not associate whatever afterlife they had conceived with a moral system of reward and punishment (like the ones found in the great Judaic religions). Although individual myths, like that of Sisyphus who was condemned to eternal punishment in the realms of Hades, did exist, they were largely exceptions to the rule and never developed into a proper system of beliefs about life after death. In one of his lectures, Liantinis says that Homer describes a scene where the hero, before engaging him in battle, says to his opponent: "the race of men is related to that of leaves" ("οἵη περ φύλλων γενεὴ τοίη δὲ καὶ ἀνδρῶν"), as we momentarily stand fresh on the tree branch, then quickly surrender to the wind and rain. The lyric poet Pindar also questions in his works: "What are we [men] but dreams of shadows..." ("σκιᾶς ὄναρ ἄνθρωπος"), "...not even shadows proper" as Liantinis points out.

The only form of immortality that Liantinis (and the Greeks, according to him) believed in was what he called "intra-world immortality" (ενδοκοσμική αθανασία), which comes from the memories a man leaves behind him, through his deeds and life example. This is indeed in accordance with the immense value the ancient Greeks placed on posthumous reputation (υστεροφημία).

On the same subject, he also emphasised the Greek hero's individualism (opposite to the Eastern dissolution of the self inside the Great Universe), even to the point of choosing his own death. In Gemma, he writes poetically: "I will die, Death, when I want and not when you want. In this last act, your desire is not going to be realized; it is my desire which will be realized. I fight against your will. I fight your power. I fight your entire entity. I will enter into the earth when I decide, not when you decide." [Gemma 1997].

== Disappearance and death ==
Liantinis disappeared on 1 June 1998. A taxi driver claimed that he drove the professor on the same day near Sparti (near Taygetos) and that he was wearing a blue shirt and white footwear.

Liantinis had instructed his cousin to reveal to his daughter, after seven years, the location of the crypt where his remains could be found. His cousin did so. In July 2005 human bones were found in the area of the mountain Taygetos; forensic examinations verified that it was the body of Liantinis. No lethal substances were found to determine the cause of death.

Some people believe that Liantinis took his own life as a protest against what he saw as the lack of values in modern Greek society. In his last letter to his daughter he wrote: "My last act has the meaning of protest for the evil that we, the adults, prepare for the innocent new generations that are coming. We live our life eating their flesh. A very bad evil. My unhappiness over this crime kills me."

== Bibliography (selection) ==
- Liantinis D. (1984). Homo Educandus. Pub.: Vivliogonia.
- Liantinis D. (1992). Τα Ελληνικά. Pub.: Vivliogonia.
- Liantinis D. (1997). Gemma. Pub.: Vivliogonia. ISBN 978-960-7088-23-9 (English translation by Yiannis Tsapras. Available on Amazon ISBN 1492179698 and as a Kindle e-book; German translation by Nikolaos Karatsioras as Gemma: Wie man Mensch wird. Pub. Frank & Time).

An online resource (Liantinis.gr) written and managed by his wife Professor Nikolitsa Georgopoulou contains letters to her, manuscripts, un-edited texts and critical comments for his books.

== See also ==
- Lists of solved missing person cases
- List of unsolved deaths
